= True at First Light =

1999 posthumous book by Ernest Hemingway

- First edition cover
- Author: Ernest Hemingway
- Language: English
- Genre: Non-fiction novel, memoir
- Publisher: Charles Scribner's Sons
- Publication date: 1999
- Publication place: United States
- Media type: Print (hardcover and paperback)
- Pages: 320
- ISBN: 978-0684849218

True at First Light is a book by American writer Ernest Hemingway about his 1953–54 safari in Kenya with his fourth wife Mary. It was released posthumously in his centennial year in 1999. In the book, which blends memoir and fiction, Hemingway explores conflict within a marriage, the conflict between the European and native cultures in Africa, and the fear a writer feels when his work becomes impossible. True at First Light includes descriptions of his earlier friendships with other writers and digressive ruminations on the nature of writing.

Hemingway began writing the book after he and his wife were involved in two plane crashes in the African bush in a two-day period in January 1954. He spent much of the next two years in Havana, recuperating and writing the manuscript of what he called "the Africa book", which remained unfinished at the time of his suicide in July 1961. Hemingway's son Patrick edited the work to half its original length to strengthen the underlying storyline and emphasize the fictional aspects.

True at First Light received mostly negative or lukewarm reviews from the popular press and sparked a literary controversy regarding whether, and how, an author's work should be reworked and published after his death. Unlike critics in the popular press, Hemingway scholars generally consider True at First Light to be complex and a worthy addition to his canon of later fiction.

== Background ==
Hemingway went on safari to Africa in 1933 with his second wife Pauline and always intended to return. That visit inspired Hemingway's book Green Hills of Africa and his short story "The Snows of Kilimanjaro", both well-known works in the Hemingway canon. Two decades later in 1953, having finished writing The Old Man and the Sea, he planned a trip to Africa to visit his son Patrick who lived in Tanganyika. When Look magazine offered to send him to Africa, paying $15,000 for expenses, $10,000 for rights to a 3500 word piece about the trip, and Earl Theisen as official photographer to go with him, he quickly accepted. Hemingway and Mary left Cuba in June, traveling first to Europe to make arrangements and leaving from Venice to Tanganyika a few months later. They arrived in August, and Hemingway was thrilled to be deputized as an honorary ranger, writing in a letter, "due to emergency [the Mau Mau rebellion] been acting game ranger". Philip Percival, Hemingway's safari guide in 1933, joined the couple for the four-month expedition; they traveled from the banks of the Salengai, where Earl Theisen photographed Hemingway with a herd of elephants, to the Kimana Swamp, the Rift Valley and then on to visit Patrick in central Tanganyika. After visiting Patrick at his farm, they settled for two months on the north slopes of Mount Kilimanjaro. During this period, Percival left their camp to return to his farm, leaving Hemingway as game warden with local scouts reporting to him. Hemingway was proud to be a game warden and believed a book would come of the experience.

On January 21, Hemingway chartered a sightseeing flight of the Congo Basin as a late Christmas present to Mary; two days later, on their way to photograph Murchison Falls from the air, the plane hit an abandoned utility pole and crashed, with the passengers sustaining minor injuries. That night, they camped in the bush waiting for a response to their distress call. The crash site was seen by a passing airliner that reported no survivors, and the news of Hemingway's death was telegraphed around the world. The next day, they were found and picked up by a bush pilot, but his de Havilland caught fire during take-off, crashed and exploded, which left Hemingway with a concussion, scalp wound, double-vision, intermittent hearing in his left ear, a crushed vertebra, ruptured liver, spleen and kidney, and burns. The explosion burned their passports, "thirty rolls of exposed film, three pairs of Ernest's bifocals, all of their money, and their $15,000 letter of credit." The group traveled to Entebbe in Uganda by road, where journalists from around the world had gathered to report his death. On January 26, Hemingway briefed and joked with the reporters, and spent the next few weeks in Nairobi recuperating and reading his obituaries. During his recuperation, Hemingway immediately prepared the piece for Look. The magazine paid him an additional $20,000 for an exclusive about the plane crashes. Biographer Michael Reynolds wrote that the piece "ran for twenty magazine pages spread out over two issues", with the first issue bearing a publication date of 26 January.

In spite of his injuries, Hemingway joined Patrick and his wife on a planned fishing trip in February, but he was irascible and difficult to get along with. When a bushfire broke out, Hemingway fell into the fire while helping extinguish the flames, burning himself on his legs, front torso, lips, left hand and right forearm. Months later in Venice, Hemingway was diagnosed with two cracked discs, a kidney and liver rupture, a dislocated shoulder, and a broken skull.

As soon as Hemingway returned to Finca Vigía in Cuba, he began work on a book about the safari, wanting to write while it was still vivid in his memory. He quickly wrote 10,000 words, despite his pain (eventually the manuscript grew to about 800 pages). In September 1954, Hemingway wrote in a letter, "At present I work at about 1/2 the capacity I should but everything is better all the time." However, three months later in late December he wrote in a letter: "This has been sort of a rough year .... We call this 'black-ass' and one should never have it. But I get tired of pain sometimes, even if that is an ignoble feeling."

Almost a year later in October 1955, he declared: "Am passed 650 pages in the book. Am trying to write now like a good sorcer's (sic) apprentice ... always start to write as an apprentice. By the end of the book you are a master but if you commence as master in writing anyway, you end as a bloody bore." Two months later, Hemingway was bedridden with kidney disease. By January 1956, he acknowledged, in a letter written on the second anniversary of the accidents, that he was having trouble remembering the trip. In 1956, Hemingway agreed to work on the filming of The Old Man and the Sea and abandoned work on "the Africa book". He wrote to his editor, "I found it impossible to resume writing on the Africa book." Hemingway put the manuscript in a safe-deposit box in Havana, although after the 1959 Cuban revolution he feared the manuscript lost.

== Synopsis ==
True at First Light is set in 1950s-British Kenya during the Mau Mau rebellion. In his introduction, Patrick Hemingway describes the Kikuyu and Kamba tribes at the time of the Mau-Mau rebellion. He explains that if the Kamba had joined the rebellion, Ernest and Mary Hemingway "would have then stood a good chance of being hacked to death in their beds as they slept by the very servants they so trusted and thought they understood." The book takes place in December while the narrator, Ernest, and his wife, Mary, are in a safari camp in the Kenyan highlands on the flank of Mt. Kilimanjaro, where they find themselves temporarily at risk when a group of Mau-Mau rebels escape from jail.

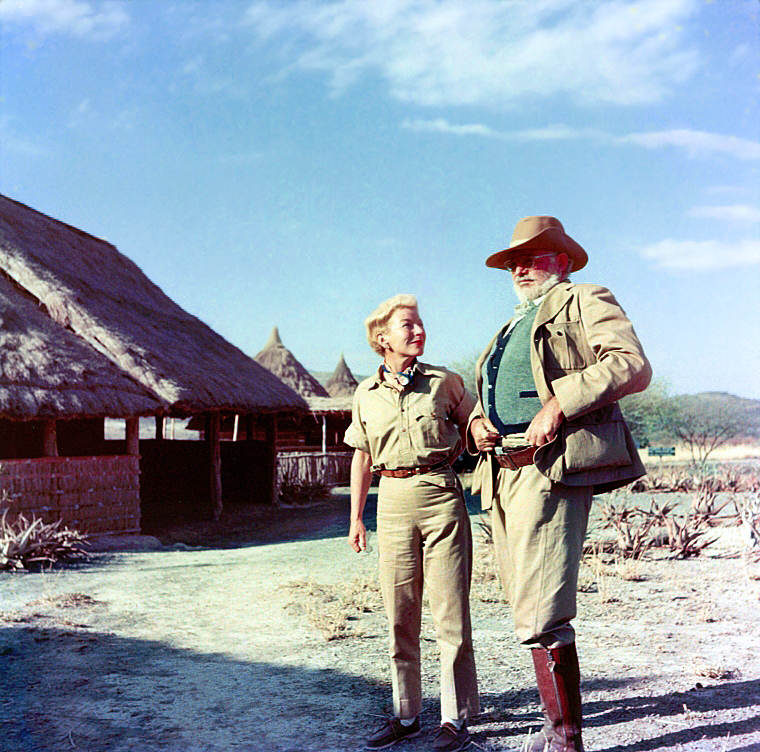
The main characters in the book were based on Ernest and Mary Hemingway, pictured here at their safari camp in 1953.

The blend of travel memoir and fiction opens with the white hunter Philip Percival leaving the safari group to visit his farm, handing control of the camp to Ernest, who is worried about being attacked and robbed, because there are guns, alcohol, and food in the camp. Deputized as an assistant game warden, he makes daily rounds in the game reserve and maintains communication with the local tribes. He is accompanied by two African game scouts, Chungo and Arap Meina and, for a period, the district game warden G.C (Gin Crazed). Other camp members include Keiti, who runs the camp, the safari cook, Mbebia, and two stewards, Nguili and Msembi.

For six months, Mary has been tracking a large black-maned lion, determined to finish the hunt by Christmas. In subsequent chapters, Ernest worries that Mary is unable to kill the lion for various reasons: she is too short to see the prey in the tall grass; she misses her shots with other game; and he thinks she is too soft-hearted to kill the animal. During this period, Ernest becomes entranced with Debba, a woman from a local village, whom the others jokingly refer to as his second wife. From her and the villagers he wants to learn tribal practices and customs.

When Mary's lion is finally killed at the book's halfway mark, the local shamba (village) gathers for a ngoma (dance). Because she has dysentery, Mary leaves for Nairobi to see a doctor; while she is gone Ernest kills a leopard, after which the men have a protracted ngoma. When Mary returns from Nairobi, she asks Ernest for an airborne sightseeing tour of the Congo Basin as a Christmas present.

Ernest describes his close relationships with the local men; indulges in memories of previous relationships with writers such as George Orwell, and D.H. Lawrence; and satirizes the role of organized religion. Subjects as diverse as the smell of the pine woods in Michigan, the nature of Parisian cafés, and the quality of Simenon's writing are treated with stream of consciousness digressions.

The back of the book includes a section titled "Cast of Characters", a Swahili glossary, and the editor's acknowledgments.

== Publication history ==
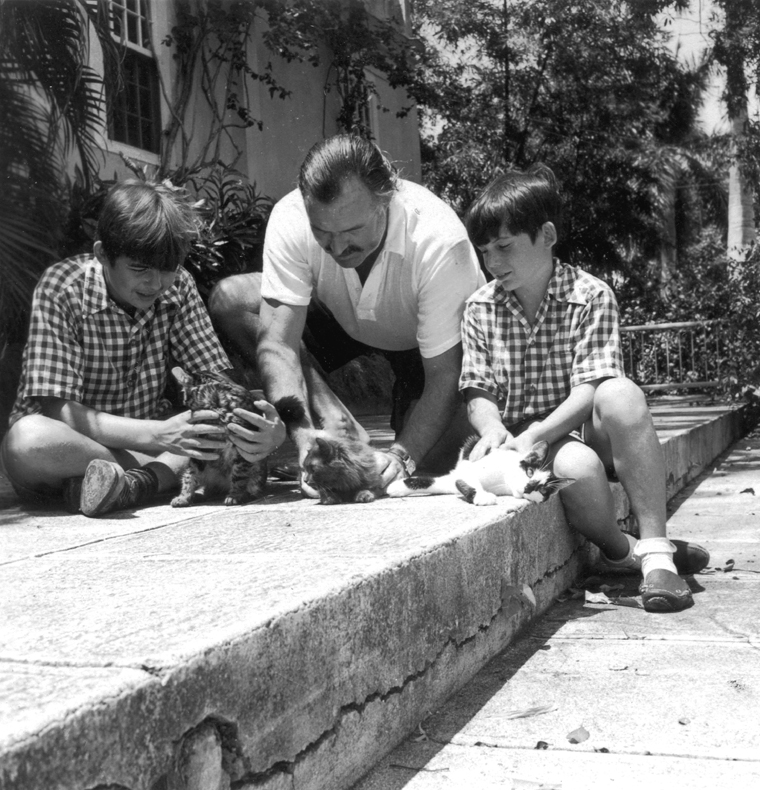
Ernest Hemingway in Cuba with his children Patrick and Gloria in 1946. Patrick edited his father's African manuscript in the 1990s to become True at First Light.

The ownership of Hemingway's manuscripts is complicated. Two books have been published from the African book manuscript: True at First Light, edited by Patrick Hemingway, and Under Kilimanjaro, edited by scholars Robert Lewis and Robert Fleming. In 1965, Mary Hemingway established the Hemingway Foundation, and in the 1970s she donated her husband's papers to the John F. Kennedy Library. A group of Hemingway scholars met in 1980 to assess the donated papers when they formed the Hemingway Society, "committed to supporting and fostering Hemingway scholarship". After Mary Hemingway's 1986 death, Hemingway's sons John and Patrick asked the Hemingway Society to take on the duties of the Hemingway Foundation; in 1997 the Hemingway Estate and the Hemingway Society/Foundation agreed to a two-part publishing plan for the African book. An abridged trade publication of True at First Light was to be published in 1999, to be edited by Patrick Hemingway; the Hemingway Foundation would then oversee the reworking of the entire text, to be published as Under Kilimanjaro. Of Under Kilimanjaro, the editors claim "this book deserves as complete and faithful a publication as possible without editorial distortion, speculation, or textually unsupported attempts at improvement".

In the early 1970s, portions of the manuscript had been serialized in Sports Illustrated and anthologized. Mary Hemingway approved the segments published by Sports Illustrated: segments described by Patrick Hemingway as a "straight account of a shooting safari". In a 1999 talk presented at the annual Oak Park Hemingway Society dinner, Patrick Hemingway admitted ownership of Ernest Hemingway's manuscripts had "a rather tortuous history". Access to the Africa manuscript—and to other Hemingway material—required a lawsuit and an eventual agreement with the Hemingway Society.

Scribner's requested a book of fewer than 100,000 words. Patrick Hemingway worked for two years with the 200,000-word manuscript—initially converting to an electronic format, and then editing out superfluous material. He strengthened the storyline, and eliminated long descriptive passages with disparaging remarks about family members and living persons. He explains the manuscript was a draft lacking "ordinary housekeeping chores" such as character names. The cuts made, he said, maintained the integrity of the story and "the reader is not deprived of the essential quality of the book".

True at First Light was published on July 7, 1999 with a print run of 200,000. For the publicity campaign, Patrick Hemingway appeared on the NBC program Today on the day of publication. The book became the main selection for the Book of the Month Club (BOMC), was serialized in The New Yorker, and rights were sold for translations to Danish, French, German, Icelandic, Italian, Norwegian, Polish, Spanish, and Swedish. A sound recording was released in 2007.

== Genre ==
In Africa a thing is true at first light and a lie by noon and you have no more respect for it than for the lovely, perfect weed-fringed lake you see across the sun-baked salt plain. You have walked across that plain in the morning and you know that no such lake is there. But now it is there, absolutely true, beautiful and believable.
—Ernest Hemingway's epigraph for True at First Light

In The New York Times, literary critic James Wood described True at First Light as a travel journal that became a "fanciful memoir" and then a novel of sorts. Patrick Hemingway believed adamantly the manuscript was more than a journal. He emphasized the storyline because, as he explains, "the essential quality of the book is an action with a love interest". He tightened the hunting scenes, and to honor his father's statement to the reader that "where I go, you go" he emphasized the mid-20th century Africa scenes and "the real relation between people ... on that continent". Although he fictionalized the storyline, Patrick Hemingway said of the characters, "I knew every single one ... very well indeed". Hemingway scholar Robert Fleming (who reworked the manuscript as Under Kilimanjaro) considers Patrick Hemingway's editing essentially to be correct because he believes the work shows evidence of an author unable to "turn off the mechanism that produces fiction". The marital conflict is where Fleming believes the book took "a metafictional turn". The published book is marketed as fiction.

Fleming considers True at First Light similar to Hemingway's Green Hills of Africa and A Moveable Feast—a book that presents a primary topic as a backdrop interspersed with internal dialogue. Unlike the other two books, True at First Light is without a preface "indicating the intentions of the author or dictating how he intended to have the book read". Fleming thinks Hemingway regarded Green Hills of Africa as experimental and A Moveable Feast as fiction. Rose Marie Burwell, author of Hemingway: The Postwar Years and the Posthumous Novels, believes Hemingway enjoyed writing the "strange combination of memoir and fiction". She thinks in the fictional aspects of True at First Light he is free to imagine a second wife and to jettison his Protestant background.

== Themes ==
Hemingway is "most definitely on vacation" in True at First Light writes Fleming; and Burwell sees an author who is willingly and happily enjoying a vacation, behaving childishly, blissfully unaware of the effect his behavior has on the members of camp. The impression is of a man seeking to delve into cultural conflicts in Africa, which takes a fictional turn in the Debba storyline. Mary is characterized as a nag whereas the character of the writer is presented as "placid, mature, and loving", immersing himself in native culture.

Burwell and Fleming say the book's subtext is about aging, as symbolized by the writer's attraction to the younger fertile woman, and Hemingway used fertility imagery to symbolize "the aging writer's anxiety about his ability to write". The images of the old elephant symbolize the aging and unproductive writer, and Burwell approves Patrick Hemingway's decision to retain those pieces of the manuscript. Hemingway scholar Hilary Justice writes the work shows an emphasis on "the writer not writing", which for Hemingway would have been a fate worse than aging. Thus, she says, True at First Light invokes a paradox with "an aging writer for whom writing is becoming increasingly difficult in the moment of writing about the not-writing author". Writing, for Hemingway, had always been difficult. He revised his work endlessly and stuck to the practice of writing "one true sentence" and stopping each writing session when he still had more to write. Tom Jenks, editor of an earlier posthumously published book The Garden of Eden, says Hemingway shows the worst of his writing in True at First Light: presenting himself as a "self-pitying, self-indulgent, self-aggrandizing" persona in a book that is no more than a mass of fragmentary material. Jenks thinks Hemingway is simply aimlessly writing and the plot lacks the tension notable in his earliest works such as The Sun Also Rises. However, he thinks Hemingway had good material to work with and some skeletal thematic structures show promise.

True at First Light shows the nature of mid-20th century conflict in Africa. Colonialism and imperialism pressured African tribes and wildlife. Hemingway shows an awareness of the political future and turmoil in Africa according to Patrick Hemingway, who, although he lived in Tanzania (formerly Tanganyika) for decades, was surprised at the degree of perception apparent in his father's mid-century writing about Africa. Hemingway scholar Anders Hallengren notes the thematic similarities in Hemingway's posthumous fiction, particularly in the final books. The genesis of True at First Light was an African insurrection, also symbolically depicted in The Garden of Eden: "The conviction and purposefulness of the Maji-Maji in The Garden of Eden, corresponds to the Kenyan Mau-Mau context of the novel True at First Light ". Writing for The Hemingway Review, Robert Gajdusek says the clash of cultures is "massively active" in the book, with Hemingway exploring tribal practices; Christianity and Islam are juxtaposed against native religions; and the Mary/Debba triangle is symbolic of the white "Memsahib and the native girl".

Similar to his first African book Green Hills of Africa, Hemingway embeds in True at First Light digressions and ruminations about the nature of writing, with particular attention to James Joyce and D.H. Lawrence. Patrick Hemingway explains his father was interested in D.H. Lawrence's belief that each region of the world "should have its own religion"—apparent when the male character invents his own religion. Mary's intent to decorate a tree for Christmas mystified the native camp members, and Hemingway seemed to realize that Africa was a place without an influential and established religion—a place where religion could be redefined.

== Reception ==
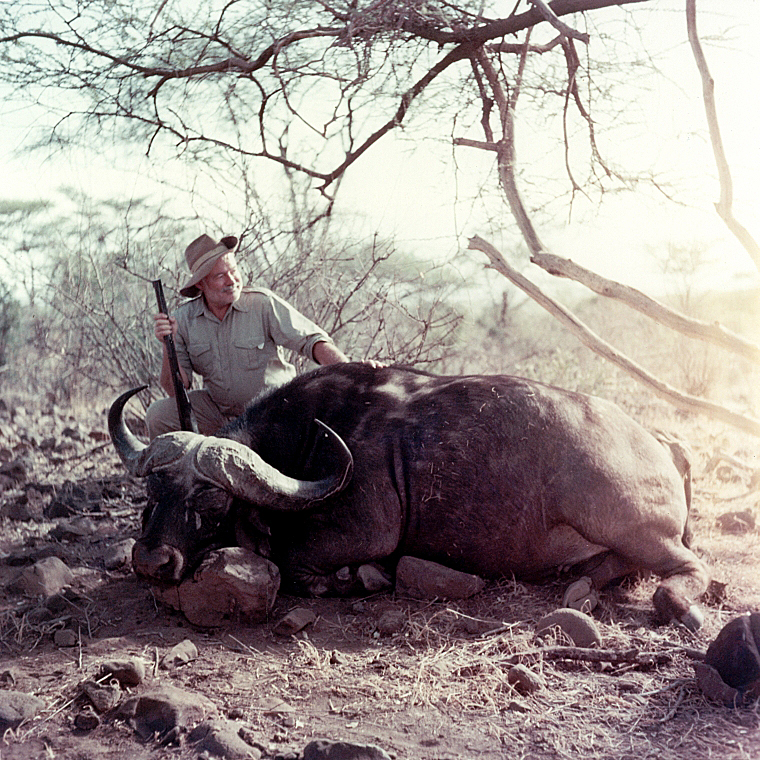
Hemingway with a Cape buffalo in Africa in 1953. The publication of True at First Light began to shift critics' emphasis away from the image of the "white man with a gun" in his works.

Although it was listed on The New York Times Best Seller list and praised by Hemingway scholars, True at First Light received poor reviews from the popular press. In a pre-publication review for The New York Times, Ralph Blumenthal said that True at First Light was not as good as Hemingway's earlier autobiographical fiction, and he questioned whether Hemingway would have wanted his "reputation and last printed words entrusted solely to any editor, even a son". Blumenthal wondered about the autobiographical aspects of the work: the relationship between Hemingway and Debba; the background of the Look magazine photoshoot; the safari itself; and the subsequent plane accidents. In a review for New York Times review, James Wood claimed that Hemingway knew True at First Light was not a novel, although the editors billed it as one. He believes Hemingway's later work became a parody of the earlier work. True at First Light represents the worst of Hemingway's work according to a review in The Guardian.

Christopher Ondaatje wrote in The Independent that the existence of a Hemingway industry tended to overshadow his posthumous work. He considered Hemingway's African stories to be among his best, although the posthumous work about Africa has been disregarded or overlooked. In her piece for The Nation, Brenda Wineapple describes the book as "poignant but not particularly good". However, she points out that it "reminds us of Hemingway's writing at its most touching, acute and beautiful best". The review in Publishers Weekly is much the same saying the "old Hemingway magic flashes sporadically, like lightning, but not often enough".

Hemingway scholars think the work is more complicated and important than a cursory read suggests. With the publication of True at First Light, critics saw a more humane and empathetic Hemingway, and began to shift their emphasis away from the image of the "white man with a gun." Robert Fleming considers True at First Light to be part of the Hemingway canon declaring, "This is a more complicated book than it appears to be, and Hemingway deserves far more credit for it than the reviewers of the popular press have given it. Serious critics dealing with the late works would be advised not to ignore it". Gajdusek praises the prose style, which he says is a new direction in Hemingway's writing; he also believes, despite the editing, the book is cohesive and whole with well-ordered themes. Burwell considers the edits to the manuscript generally well-done, though she laments losses that she thinks contribute to some of the subtexts in the book. Biographer Kenneth S. Lynn criticized Hemingway's sons for editing the manuscript but of Hemingway he says the "memoirist is being totally, indeed helplessly honest," and Gray concedes the publication of the book "underscores Hemingway's courage as a writer". Despite what he considers poor workmanship in the book, Wood considers Hemingway even at his worst a compelling writer and he says the literary estate should be left alone to save the literary influence.

== Publication controversy ==
Many reviewers and writers were critical of the manner in which Patrick Hemingway edited the work. Paul Gray titled his review of the book in Time magazine "Where's Papa?", answering with the opening sentence, "He's hard to find in his fifth posthumous work", pointing directly to Patrick Hemingway's editing of the manuscript. Lynn thought that Hemingway would have been "outraged by his sons' refusal to honor his judgment that the manuscript was unworthy of publication" and was shocked when Patrick declared that his siblings agree that "this job was worth doing ". Burwell also wonders whether Hemingway wanted the Africa book published, pointing to his statement, "I think maybe it would be better to wait until I'm dead to publish it", although she concedes that works by Chaucer, Shakespeare, and Kafka were unfinished and published posthumously. During the final two decades of his life, Hemingway had published two novels but since his death, works continue to be published. Writing in The New Yorker in 1998, Joan Didion was extremely critical of the Hemingway family and estate for commercializing and profiting from his reputation and writing rather than protecting his legacy. "The publication of unfinished work is a denial of the idea that the role of the writer in his or her work is to make it", she wrote, adding that True at First Light should not have been "molded" and published.

True at First Light was published in Hemingway's centennial year, and the marketing campaign that surrounded it attracted criticism. Hemingway's sons licensed the family name and, that year, released items such as Thomasville furniture with labels showing the Hemingway lifestyle—"the Pamplona Sofa and the Kilimanjaro Bed"—and the Hemingway Ltd. brand, which Lynn describes as "tastefully chosen fishing rods, safari clothes, and (surely the ultimate triumph of greed over taste) shotguns". (Note: On July 2, 1961 Hemingway killed himself by shooting himself in the head with his shotgun.)

== Notes ==
=== Sources ===
- Baker, Carlos, ed. (1981). Ernest Hemingway Selected Letters 1917 -1961. New York: Scribner's. ISBN 0-684-16765-4.
- Baker, Carlos (1972). Hemingway: The Writer as Artist (4th ed.). Princeton, NJ: Princeton University Press.
- Burwell, Rose Marie (1999). "Something's Lost and Something's Gained". The Hemingway Review. 19 (1).
- del Gizzo, Suzanne (1999). "A Lie By Noon?". The Hemingway Review. 19 (1).
- Fleming, Robert (1999). "Africa Revisited". The Hemingway Review. 19 (1).
- Gajdusek, Robert (1999). "One Blind Man Exploring a Pretty Big Elephant". The Hemingway Review. 19 (1).
- Hemingway, Ernest (1999). Hemingway, Patrick (ed.). True at First Light. New York: Scribner's. ISBN 0-684-84921-6. OCLC 40543980.
- Hemingway, Patrick (1999). "Introduction". True at First Light. New York: Scribner's. ISBN 0-684-84921-6. OCLC 40543980.
- Jenks, Tom (1999). "The Old Man and the Manuscript". Harper's Magazine. Vol. 298, no. 1788.
- Justice, Hilary K. (1999). "The Lion, the Leopard, and the Bear". The Hemingway Review. 19 (1).
- Lynn, Kenneth S. (1999). "Hemingway LTD". National Review. 51 (12).
- Maryles, Daisy; Dick Donahue (1999). "Death Shall Have No Dominion". Publishers Weekly. 246 (12).
- Miller, Linda Patterson (2006). "From the African Book to Under Kilimanjaro". The Hemingway Review. 25 (2). doi:10.1353/hem.2006.0033. S2CID 161156516.
- Mellow, James R. (1992). Hemingway: A Life Without Consequences. New York: Houghton Mifflin. ISBN 0-395-37777-3.
- Meyers, Jeffrey (1985). Hemingway: A Biography. London: Macmillan. ISBN 0-333-42126-4.
- Reynolds, Michael S. (2000). Hemingway: The Final Years. New York: Norton. ISBN 0-393-32047-2.
- Seefeldt (1999). "An Evening with Patrick Hemingway". The Hemingway Review. 19 (1).
- Steinberg, Sybil (1999). "True at First Light". Publishers Weekly. 246 (19).
- Wineapple, Brenda (1999). "The Sun Also Sets". Nation. 268 (22).
