= Under Kilimanjaro =

Book by Ernest Hemingway

First edition (publ. Kent State University Press)

Under Kilimanjaro is a non-fiction novel by Ernest Hemingway (July 21, 1899 – July 2, 1961), edited and published posthumously by Robert W. Lewis and Robert E. Fleming. It is based upon journals that he wrote while he was on his last safari. It is a longer and re-edited version of True at First Light.

True at First Light was published in 1999. The book was presented as a "fictional memoir". Six years later the work was republished a second time as Under Kilimanjaro. The work is based on a partially written manuscript, and is about Hemingway's second trip to Africa. Under Kilimanjaro was edited by Robert W. Lewis and Robert E. Fleming who state: “this book deserves as complete and faithful a publication as possible without editorial distortion, speculation, or textually unsupported attempts at improvement.”

== See also ==
- Green Hills of Africa, a non-fictional account of a Hemingway safari in 1933
