= Patrick Hemingway =

Son of Ernest Hemingway (1928–2025)

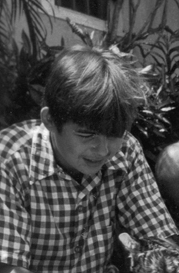
- Hemingway in 1942
- Born: Patrick Miller Hemingway; June 28, 1928; Kansas City, Missouri, U.S.
- Died: September 2, 2025 (aged 97); Bozeman, Montana, U.S.
- Education: Harvard University (BA)
- Occupations: Wildlife management; writer
- Spouses: Henrietta Broyles (m. 1950; died 1963) Carol Thompson (m. 1982; died 2023)
- Children: 1
- Parents: Ernest Hemingway; Pauline Pfeiffer
- Relatives: Gloria Hemingway (sister); Jack Hemingway (paternal half-brother)

Patrick Miller Hemingway (June 28, 1928 – September 2, 2025) was an American wildlife manager and writer who was novelist Ernest Hemingway's second son and the first born to Hemingway's second wife Pauline Pfeiffer. During his childhood he travelled frequently with his parents and then attended Harvard University, graduated in 1950, and, shortly thereafter, moved to and lived in East Africa for twenty-five years. In Tanzania, Patrick was a professional big-game hunter and owned a safari business for more than a decade. In the 1960s, the United Nations appointed Hemingway to the Wildlife Management College in Tanzania as a teacher of conservation and wildlife. In the 1970s, he moved to Montana, where he managed the intellectual property of his father's estate. For example, he edited his father's unpublished novel about a 1950s safari to Africa and published it with the title True at First Light (1999).

== Personal life ==
Born in Kansas City, Missouri, on June 28, 1928, Hemingway traveled with his parents to Europe in 1929 and again in 1933, to Wyoming and Idaho during his summers, though his permanent residence was in Key West. In 1940, his parents divorced, after which his father married Martha Gellhorn. After their marriage, they moved to Cuba where Patrick visited often. He enrolled at Canterbury School in New Milford, Connecticut, graduating in 1946. At the beginning of World War II, Hemingway helped crew his father's boat, the Pilar, on improvised missions to hunt for German U-boats operating in the Gulf of Mexico. Patrick attended Stanford University for two years, transferred to Harvard and graduated in 1950 with a BA in History and Literature.

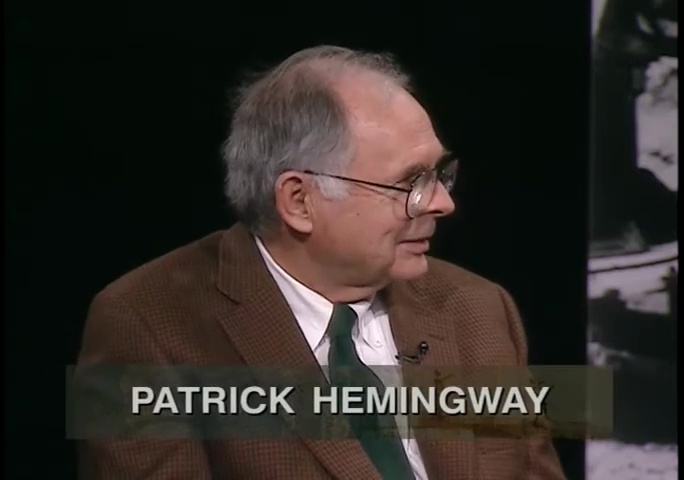
Hemingway interviewed on CUNY TV's City Cinematheque, 2002

Hemingway, Ken Burns's six-hour documentary on Hemingway's life and writing, contains photographs and film footage of Hemingway, including interviews with him about his life with his father.

Hemingway was married to Henrietta Broyles, with whom he had a daughter, Mina Hemingway (born 1960). He remarried after Broyles's death, to Carol Thompson. He died on September 2, 2025, in Bozeman, Montana, at the age of 97.

== Africa ==
Having studied agriculture at his mother's plantation in Piggott, Arkansas, Hemingway used his inheritance after her death to buy a 2,300-acre (9.3 km^{2}) farm near Dar-es-Salaam. He and his wife moved to Africa, where he lived for 25 years. Hemingway lived for much of his life in Tanganyika where he ran a safari expedition company, served as a white hunter to wealthy patrons, and as an honorary game warden in Kenya, Uganda, and Tanzania. He started his safari business, called Tanganyika Safari Business, near Mount Kilimanjaro in 1955, which he gave up in the early 1960s when his wife was ill. For 12 years he taught conservation of wildlife at the College of African Wildlife Management in Tanzania, as part of his job as forestry officer in the Food and Agriculture Organization (FAO) of the United Nations. The College of African Wildlife Management at Mweka trains armed officers to enforce wildlife protection laws in Sub-Saharan Africa.

Hemingway's father Ernest died in 1961, and his wife Henrietta died in 1963. When he left Africa he moved to Bozeman, Montana, where he lived from 1975 until his death. He oversaw the management of Ernest Hemingway's intellectual property, which includes projects in publishing, electronic media, and movies in the United States and worldwide.

== True at First Light ==
Hemingway edited his father's "Africa book" that was published in 1999 with the title True at First Light. The book is a blend of fact and fiction from the East Africa expedition Ernest and fourth wife Mary went on from late 1953 to early 1954, in part to visit Patrick and his wife. Toward the end of the trip Ernest Hemingway was in two successive plane crashes and was reported dead. He sustained a severe head injury which went largely undiagnosed until he left Africa. Upon his return to Cuba he worked sporadically on True at First Light, but eventually set it aside.

The manuscript was in the John F. Kennedy Library Hemingway Archives, and Patrick edited the 800 pages down to half the size of the original. He had been present with his father during much of the expedition and was familiar with the events of Africa during that year, which he describes in the foreword to True at First Light.

== Additional writing ==
Hemingway contributed the introductions to the 1990 edition of Ernest Hemingway's Green Hills of Africa and the 1991 edition of Valley of Life: Africa's Great Rift; the forewords to the 2003 posthumous collections Hemingway on Hunting and Hemingway on War; and a foreword to the 2009 restored edition of his father's A Moveable Feast. For the 2012 special edition of A Farewell to Arms, containing all 47 alternative endings, Patrick wrote a personal foreword. In 2022, he published Dear Papa, a collection of correspondence between him and his father.

== Sources ==
- "About Patrick Hemingway". The Hemingway Review. 19 (1): 6. 1999.
- Mellow, James R. (1992). Hemingway: A Life Without Consequences. New York: Houghton Mifflin. ISBN 0-395-37777-3.
- Meyers, Jeffrey (1985). Hemingway: A Biography. London: Macmillan. ISBN 0-333-42126-4.
- Oliver, Charles M. (1999). Ernest Hemingway A to Z: The Essential Reference to the Life and Work. New York: Checkmark. ISBN 0-8160-3467-2.
