= Robert E. Fleming =

American literary scholar

Robert Edward Fleming
- Born: 1936 (age 89–90)
- Occupation: American Literary Scholar
- Writing career
- Subject: Ernest Hemingway
- Notable works: The Face in the Mirror: Hemingway's Writers; Under Kilimanjaro

Robert Edward Fleming (born 1936), is an American literary scholar known for his work on Ernest Hemingway. He is a professor emeritus of English at the University of New Mexico. In 2005 he co-edited (with Robert W. Lewis) a scholarly edition of Ernest Hemingway's Under Kilimanjaro.

He was a co-editor of American Literary Realism 1870–1910 from 1986 to 1996.

== See also ==
- Charles Fletcher Lummis
- James Weldon Johnson
- Arna Wendell Bontemps
- Sinclair Lewis
- Willard Motley

== Publications ==
- Fleming, Robert E (July 30, 1996). The Face in the Mirror: Hemingway's Writers. Boise State University Western Writers Series. Tuscaloosa, AL 35487-0380: University Alabama Press. p. 208. ISBN 978-0-8173-0864-3. ISBN 0-8173-0864-4.
- --- (July 1981). Charles F. Lummis (Paperback). Boise State University Western Writers Series. Boise, Idaho 83725: Boise State University. p. 53. ISBN 978-0-88430-074-8. ISBN 0-88430-074-9.
- --- (July 1987). James Weldon Johnson (Hardcover). Twayne's United States Authors Series. Twayne Publishers. pp. 123. ISBN 978-0-8057-7491-7. ISBN 0-8057-7491-2.
- --- (September 4, 1978). James Weldon Johnson and Arna Wendell Bontemps (Hardcover). A reference publication in literature. Farmington Hills, MI: G. K. Hall & Company. pp. 149. ISBN 978-0-8161-7932-9. ISBN 0-8161-7932-8.
- --- (1980). Sinclair Lewis, a reference guide (Hardcover). A reference publication in literature. Farmington Hills, MI: G. K. Hall. pp. 240. ISBN 978-0-8161-8094-3. ISBN 0-8161-8094-6.
- --- (November 22, 1978). Willard Motley (Hardcover). U.S.Authors. Boston: Twayne Publishers. pp. 168. ISBN 978-0-8057-7207-4. ISBN 0-8057-7207-3.
- --- (September 15, 2005). Lewis, Robert W; Fleming, Robert E (eds.). Under Kilimanjaro (Hardcover). Kent OH 44242: Kent State University Press. p. 456. ISBN 978-0-87338-845-0. ISBN 0-87338-845-3.
