= Green Hills of Africa =

1935 book by Ernest Hemingway

- First edition
- Author: Ernest Hemingway
- Language: English
- Publisher: Charles Scribner's Sons
- Publication date: 25 October 1935
- Publication place: United States
- ISBN: 0684801299

Green Hills of Africa is a 1935 work of nonfiction by American writer Ernest Hemingway. It is his second work of nonfiction, one that chronicles a month-long safari Hemingway and his wife, Pauline Marie Pfeiffer, took in East Africa during December 1933. Divided into four parts: "Pursuit and Conversation", "Pursuit Remembered", "Pursuit and Failure", and "Pursuit as Happiness", each plays a different role in the story. The book blends travel narrative, hunting memoir, and literary reflection.

== Background and publication ==
Hemingway wrote Green Hills of Africa based on his 1933 East African safari. He sought to craft what he called "an absolutely true book", exploring whether a work of nonfiction could achieve the same artistic integrity as a novel.

The book was first serialized in Scribner's Magazine between May and November 1935, and published in full on October 25, 1935, by Charles Scribner's Sons, with a first print run of 10,500 copies.

Though admired for its descriptive passages of the African landscape, the book's reception was uneven. Some critics dismissed it as self-indulgent, while others praised its introspective and philosophical tone. Hemingway later admitted that the critical backlash led to a period of depression and self-doubt.

== Synopsis ==
Set largely in Tanganyika (modern-day Tanzania), the narrative recounts Hemingway's big-game hunting expedition near Lake Manyara.

In Part 1: "Pursuit and Conversation", Hemingway discusses American and European writers with an Austrian expatriate while reflecting on hunting and jealousy among his peers.

Part 2: "Pursuit Remembered" shifts to a flashback of previous hunts in northern Tanzania and explores his literary ideals. The flashback is a description of the Rift Valley and descriptions of how to field dress prey. Hemingway kills a rhinoceros, but his friend Karl kills a bigger one. The literary discussion moves to European writers such as Tolstoy, Flaubert, Stendhal, and Dostoevsky.

In Part 3: "Pursuit and Failure", Hemingway struggles to find a kudu and confronts frustration and envy.

Finally, in Part 4: "Pursuit as Happiness", he succeeds in killing a magnificent kudu bull, only to learn that his friend Karl shot an even larger one, forcing him to confront pride, humility, and the meaning of achievement.

== Characters ==
- Ernest Hemingway (Narrator): The author's self-portrait as a reflective hunter and writer seeking artistic truth
- Pauline Pfeiffer: Hemingway's second wife, who accompanied him on the safari
- Charles Thompson (Karl): A friend and fellow hunter whose successes test Hemingway's competitiveness
- Philip Percival (Pop): A seasoned professional hunter guiding the expedition
- Hans Koritschoner (Kandisky): An Austrian farmer and intellectual who debates literature with Hemingway after his truck breaks down

== Reception ==
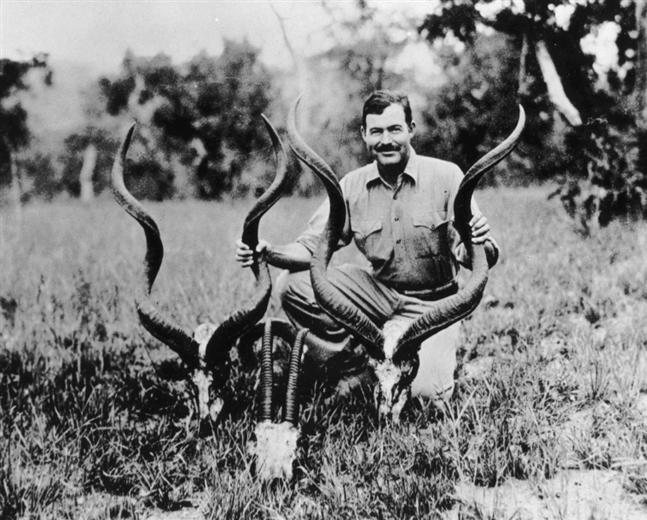
Ernest Hemingway poses with skulls of kudu and female of sable antelope. East Africa, February 1934. JFK Library

Green Hills of Africa initially got a cool reception. Writing for The New York Times, critic John Chamberlain claimed: "Green Hills of Africa is not one of the major Hemingway works. Mr. Hemingway has so simplified his method that all his characters talk the lingo perfected in The Sun Also Rises, whether these characters are British, Austrian, Arabian, Ethiopian or Kikuyu." However, two days later, writing for the same newspaper, critic C. G. Poore hailed Green Hills of Africa as "the best-written story of big-game hunting anywhere I have read. And more than that. It's a book about people in unacknowledged conflict and about the pleasures of travel and the pleasures of drinking and war and peace and writing." Despite the better review, Hemingway said the book critics "killed" the book. He went into a deep depression, and said he was "ready to blow my lousy head off". Within a few months he was ready to blame the corrupting influence of the wealthy women in his life—his wife Pauline and his mistress Jane Mason. The result of his bitterness were two stories about Africa, which count among his most celebrated: "The Short Happy Life of Francis Macomber" and "The Snows of Kilimanjaro", that featured husbands married to domineering women.

== Literary analysis ==
The foreword of Green Hills of Africa immediately identifies this as a work of nonfiction that should be compared with similar works of fiction:

Unlike many novels, none of the characters or incidents in this book is imaginary. Any one not finding sufficient love interest is at liberty, while reading it, to insert whatever love interest he or she may have at the time. The writer has attempted to write an absolutely true book to see whether the shape of a country and the pattern of a month's action can, if truly presented, compete with a work of the imagination.

The book is well known today for a line that has nearly nothing to do with its subject. This quote is frequently used as evidence that Adventures of Huckleberry Finn is The Great American Novel:

The good writers are Henry James, Stephen Crane, and Mark Twain. That's not the order they're good in. There is no order for good writers.... All modern American literature comes from one book by Mark Twain called Huckleberry Finn. If you read it you must stop where the Nigger Jim is stolen from the boys. That is the real end. The rest is just cheating. But it's the best book we've had. All American writing comes from that. There was nothing before. There has been nothing as good since.

One episode in Green Hills of Africa is Hemingway's conversation with the Austrian farmer Kandisky, whom Hemingway stops to help when Kandisky's truck breaks down. After trading opinions on writers Ringelnatz, Rilke and Heinrich Mann and disagreeing about hunting, Hemingway and the Austrian discuss American literature over dinner, and it turns out that one of the few American writers Hemingway approves of is Henry James, whom he mentions twice.

Specifically, Hemingway says: "The good American writers are Henry James, Stephen Crane, and Mark Twain" and adds later that "Henry James wanted to make money. He never did, of course". Intermixed with these comments on James, Crane, and Twain are Hemingway's views of American writers in general, most of whom, he says, came to a bad end. When Kandisky asks about himself Hemingway tells him, "I am interested in other things. I have a good life but I must write because if I do not write a certain amount I do not enjoy the rest of my life." When asked what he wants, Hemingway replies, "To write as well as I can and learn as I go along. At the same time, I have my life which I enjoy and which is a damned good life."
