= Russell J. York =

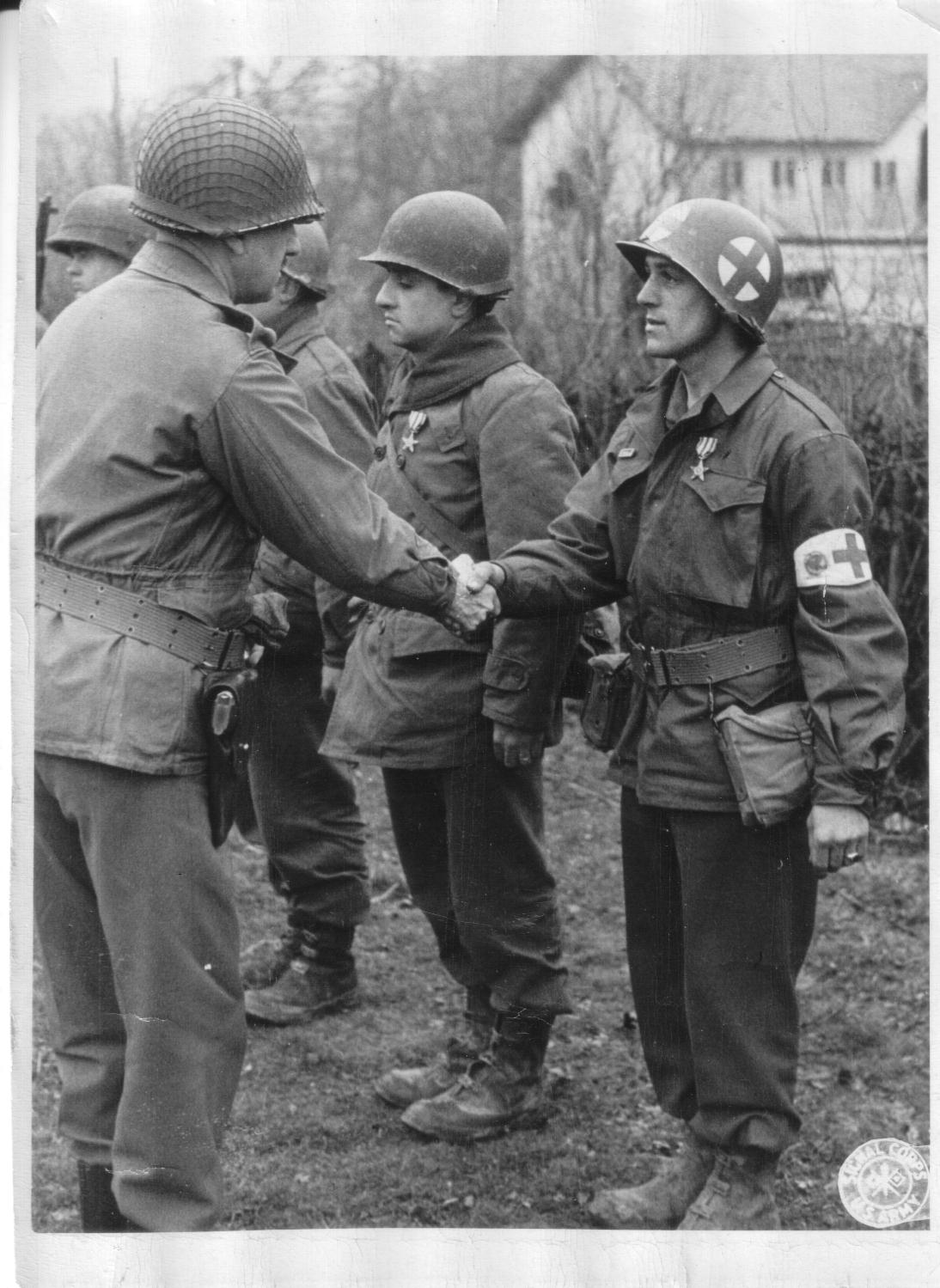
Silver Star Prum 1945

Russell J. York (August 5, 1921 – July 22, 2006) was a native of Waterville, Maine, who served in World War II in 1942–1945 as a combat medic assigned to the 4th Engineer Battalion of the U.S. 4th Infantry Division. He landed at Utah Beach on D-Day under the command of Gen. Theodore Roosevelt Jr. and with the U.S. 22d Infantry Regiment served in the campaigns in Northern France, Rhineland, Battle of the Bulge and Central Europe.

York was interviewed in 2005 for the Veterans' History Project about his service. The tape is available for the public through that organization at the Library of Congress's veteran's website

== Silver Star citation ==
In the battle for the Hurtgen Forest, with the writer Ernest Hemingway, serving under Colonel, later Major General Charles T. Lanham, York earned the Silver Star.

For gallantry in action in Germany, November 20, 1944, Technician Medical Fourth Grade York accompanied an engineer squad on a mission of building a two-span trestle bridge. The bridge site [The Weiser Weh near Grosshau] and a nearby crossroads were under direct enemy observation and subject to mortar and artillery fire. While the work was in progress, the enemy delivered a concentration of heavy caliber artillery fire. As the squad dispersed, several members became casualties.

Although the shelling continued, Technician Medical Fourth Grade York went from one man to another administering first aid. While one casualty lay in an exposed position, directly on the crossroads, he bandaged his wounds and assisted in removing him to a vehicle. As the shelling continued, York repeatedly entered the zone of fire to administer to the casualties, regardless of personal risk involved. Many shells burst close by, but he persisted in work until all wounded were evacuated … York's spirit of courageous self-sacrifice resulted in saving many lives.

During the incident York ran out of tourniquet material and went to Major General Raymond O. Barton, his commander, and requested the General lend him his belt. He did and York went back in to treat more men.

== Additional service ==
York is reported to have been at the Nazi concentration camp at Buchenwald sometime during 1945, where a contingent of American press including the CBS News correspondent Edward R. Murrow arrived on April 15, 1945. However, his units weren't involved in the liberation of the camp on April 11, 1945. At the end of April, the U.S. 4th Infantry Division liberated a sub-camp of the Dachau concentration camp near Haunstetten. Prisoners from the Buchenwald camp were transferred into this region at the time.

York turned down a Purple Heart so as to not worry his mother, and because he felt coughing up blood from a concussion paled compared to what he'd seen others endure on a daily basis. He shared the incident with Hemingway, "who suffered four concussions in two years during World War II." In Company "C" he was known as "Doc." His jacket, medals, dog tags and Bible are on display at the 4th Infantry Division museum at Fort Carson, Colorado.

== Awards ==
- Silver Star
- Bronze Star
- Good Conduct Medal
- Presidential Unit Citation
- European-African-Middle Eastern Campaign Medal With Arrowhead device and one Silver Service star
- American Campaign Medal
- Army of Occupation Medal with Germany clasp
- World War II Victory Medal
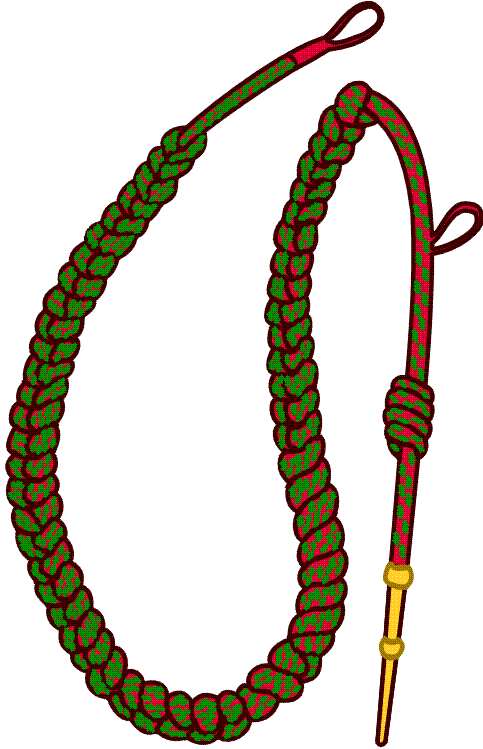
- Belgian Fourragere
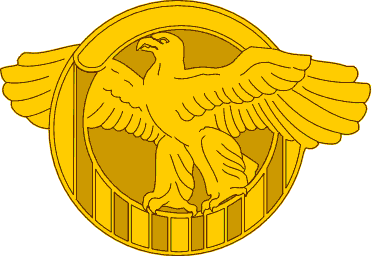
- Honorable Service Lapel Button World War II
- Combat Medical Badge
