= Raymond O. Barton =

United States Army general

Raymond Oscar Barton
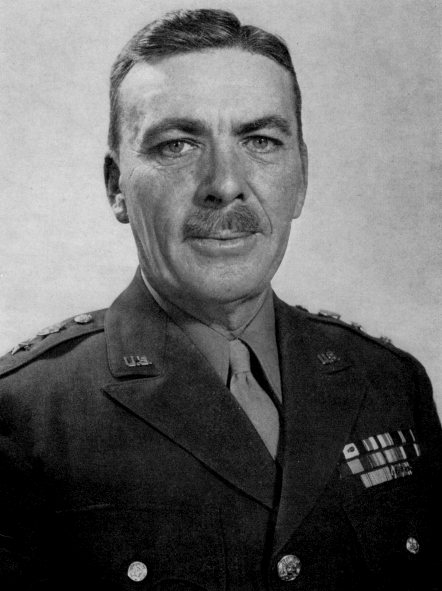
- Born: August 22, 1889; Granada, Colorado, United States
- Died: February 27, 1963 (aged 73); Augusta, Georgia, United States
- Military career
- Allegiance: United States
- Branch: United States Army
- Service years: 1912–1946
- Rank: Major General
- Nickname: "Tubby"
- Service number: 0-3401
- Unit: Infantry Branch
- Commands: 1st Battalion, 8th Infantry Regiment; 8th Infantry Regiment; 4th Infantry Division
- Conflicts: World War I; Occupation of the Rhineland; World War II; Operation Overlord; Normandy Landings; Utah Beach; Liberation of Paris; Siegfried Line campaign; Battle of Hürtgen Forest
- Awards: Army Distinguished Service Medal; Silver Star; Legion of Merit; Bronze Star

Major General Raymond Oscar "Tubby" Barton (August 22, 1889 – February 27, 1963) was a career officer in the United States Army and combat commander in World War I and World War II. As commander of the 4th Infantry Division during World War II, most notably during the Normandy landings in June 1944. He commanded the 4th Infantry Division from 3 July 1942 to 26 December 1944 and led them into battle from D-Day at Utah Beach, to the Battle of Normandy, the Liberation of Paris, and into the Battle of Hürtgen Forest before leaving the command due to health problems on December 27, 1944.

== Early life and military career ==
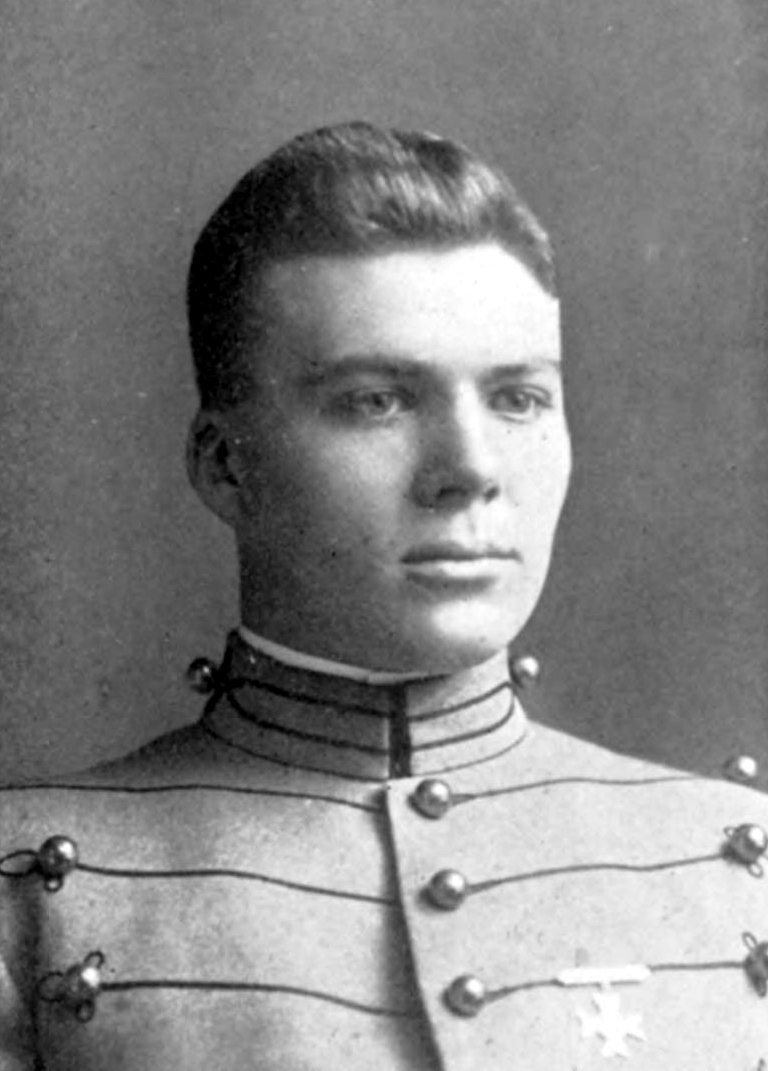
At West Point in 1912

Born on August 22, 1889, Raymond Oscar Barton graduated from the United States Military Academy (USMA) at West Point, New York, with the class of 1912.

His first assignment was with the 30th Infantry Regiment, then serving in Alaska. He did not see any active service during World War I but, by now a captain, he served in Germany from 1919 to 1923 as commander of the 1st Battalion, 8th Infantry Regiment which was the last formation to leave Germany.

He later returned to the United States, now as a major, and attended the United States Army Command and General Staff College from August 1923 to June 1924, along with the United States Army War College. He returned to the Command and General Staff College in the late 1920s, this time as an instructor. Barton then became a professor of Military Science and Tactics at Georgetown University. While he was there, on August 1, 1935, he was promoted again, this time to lieutenant colonel.

== World War II ==
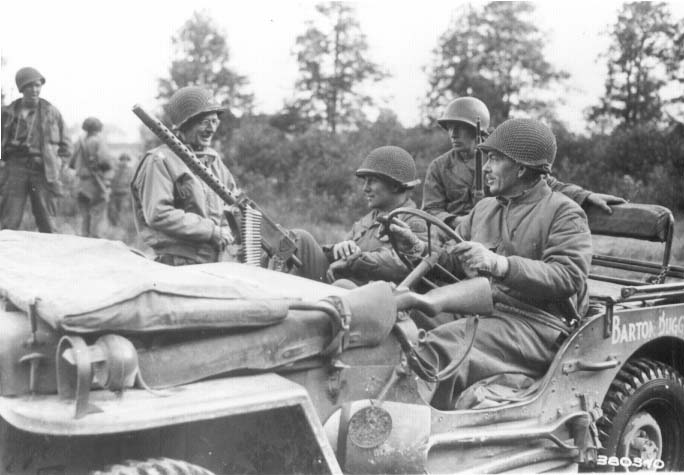
Major General Raymond O. Barton (right) and Colonel Charles T. Lanham (left) after the latter's 22nd Infantry Regiment was first to break through the Siegfried Line on September 14, 1944

The United States entered World War II in December 1941, by which time Barton was a temporary colonel, having been promoted to that rank on February 14.

Having gained for himself a reputation as an excellent trainer of troops, Barton dedicated himself to training the men under his command for their ultimate test, the Allied invasion of Normandy, which would be their baptism of fire. The division conducted training in amphibious landings at Camp Gordon Johnston, Florida, and continued to do so after it left the United States, arriving in January 1944 in England, from where the Allies would launch the invasion, then scheduled for May 1944. Once there, training in amphibious landings continued, most notably at Slapton Sands in Devon.

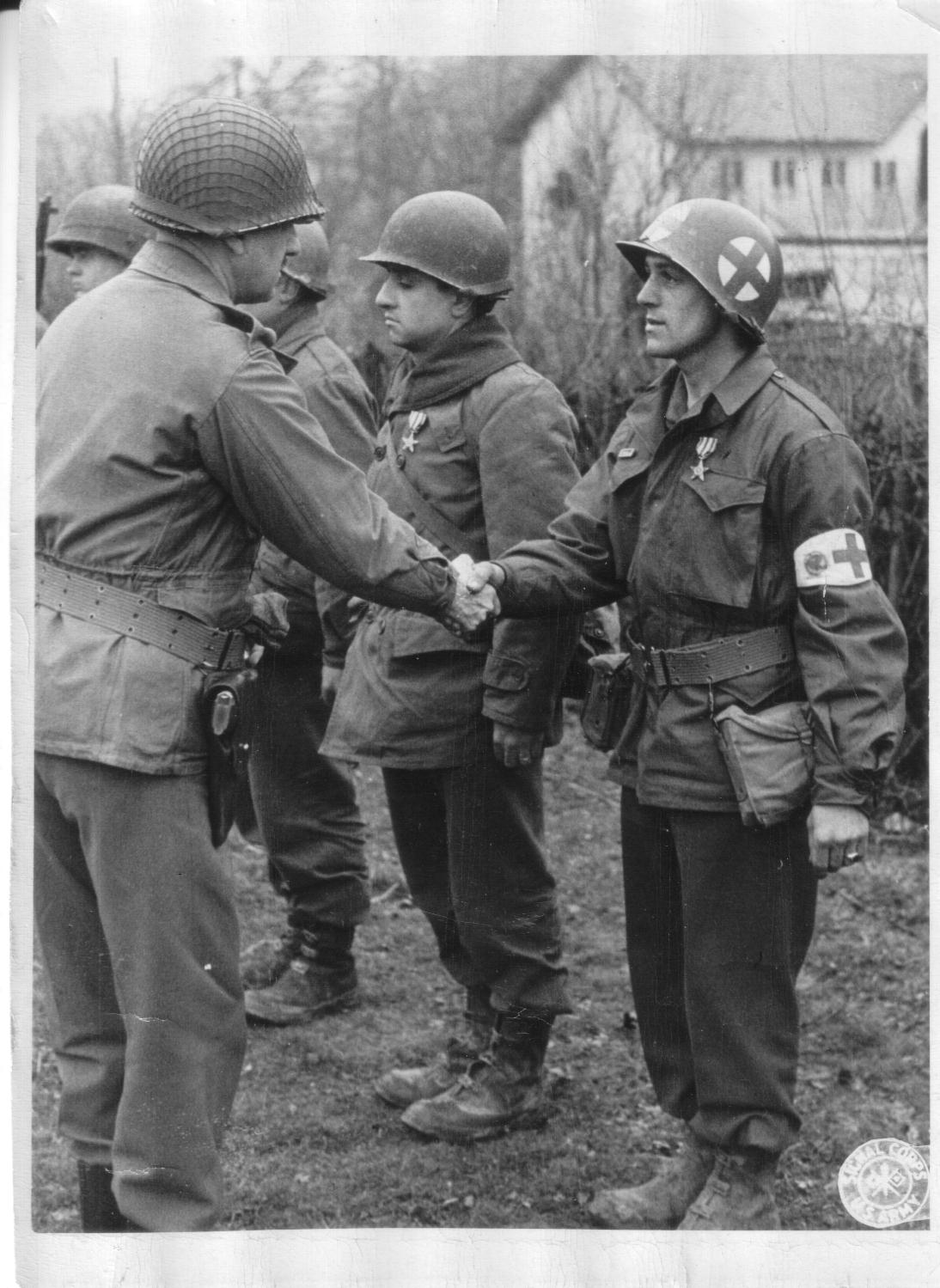
Barton awarding the Silver Star to Russell J. York.

The Allies' plan for the invasion was for the U.S. VII Corps, under Major General J. Lawton Collins, to seize and hold Utah Beach, with Barton's 4th Division as its spearhead. The division's leading units began landing on Utah Beach early in the morning on June 6, with Barton himself arriving ashore in the afternoon. In contrast to Omaha Beach, where the Germans had put a fierce defense and inflicted heavy casualties on the Americans, Utah saw only light resistance. Despite this, Barton was concerned about getting his men and equipment off of Utah and inland to link up with the American airborne forces which had landed in Normandy in the early hours of the morning (see American airborne landings in Normandy). The terrain behind Utah was flooded, which made the move inland more difficult, and meant that the causeways were the only escape inland. During one point in the afternoon Barton himself began directing traffic through the only open causeway off the beach. His worries were lessened when the Allies opened up other exits.

While on a tour of inspection of the front, General Dwight D. Eisenhower (center) and Lieutenant General Omar Bradley (center) chat with Major General Raymond O. Barton (right), commanding the 4th Infantry Division, near Weifall, Germany, November 1944.

Barton then began leading his division inland where it relieved troops of the 82nd Airborne Division who had become isolated at Sainte-Mère-Église. In the next few days Barton's division fought to enlarge the Allies' beachhead in Normandy, with the Germans putting up their usual stubborn resistance. A story of this period in the fighting in Normandy tells of Barton visiting a unit of his division to encourage the men. Upon informing them that the Germans opposite them were not first-rate, the unit's intelligence officer countered by stating that the Germans should be put on the distribution list as they apparently did not realize they were second-rate.

During the war he became friends with Ernest Hemingway who sought his favor as the war correspondent assigned to the division and the two corresponded after.

Hemingway wrote to Barton:

You had one of the greatest divisions in American military history.

During the Battle of Hürtgen Forest on the Weisser Weh stream near Grosshau, Germany General Barton gave up his belt for tourniquet material to medic Russell J. York of his division at York's request. Lives were saved, and a Silver Star was personally awarded to Technician (Medical) 4th Grade York by General Barton for his actions.

== Death ==
Barton died at Fort Gordon near Augusta, Georgia on February 27, 1963, and was buried at Westover Memorial Park.

== Popular culture ==
In the film The Longest Day he is played by Edmond O'Brien. He appears in a scene where he allows his assistant division commander, Theodore Roosevelt Jr. (played by Henry Fonda), to lead the division ashore at D-Day.

== Bibliography ==
- Tom Carhart (2002). West Point Warriors: Profiles of Duty, Honor, and Country in Battle. Grand Central. ISBN 0-446-61125-5.
- Collins, James Lawton; Chandler, David G. (1994). The D-Day Encyclopedia. Simon & Schuster. ISBN 0132036215.

Military offices
Preceded by Fred C. Wallace	Commanding General 4th Infantry Division; 1942–1944	Succeeded by Harold W. Blakeley
