= The Old Man and the Sea =

1952 novella by Ernest Hemingway

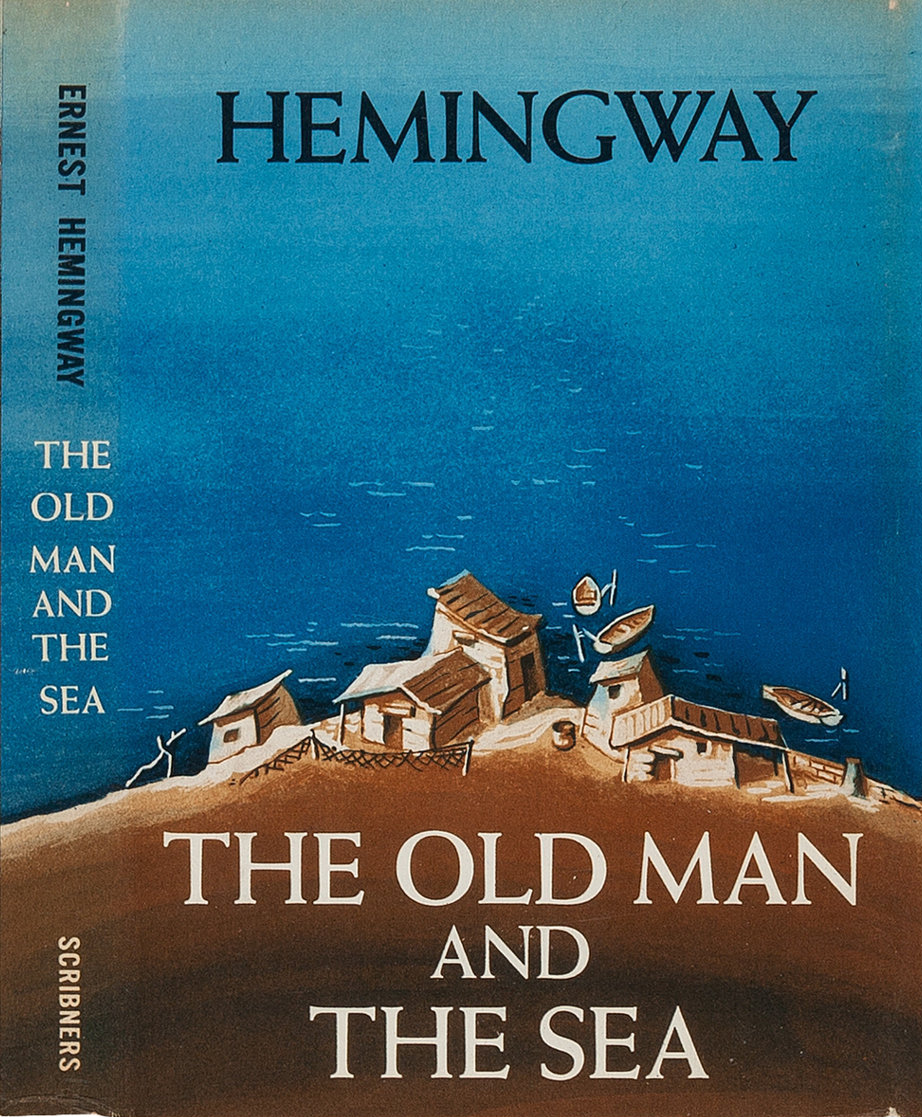
- First edition cover
- Author: Ernest Hemingway
- Language: English
- Genre: Literary fiction
- Publisher: Charles Scribner's Sons
- Publication date: September 1, 1952
- Publication place: United States
- Pages: 140 (first edition hardcover)
- Awards: Pulitzer Prize for Fiction (1953)
- ISBN: 978-1-9075-9027-6
- OCLC: 9583168
- Dewey Decimal: 813.52
- LC Class: PS3515.E37

The Old Man and the Sea is a 1952 novella by the American author Ernest Hemingway. Written between December 1950 and February 1951, it was the last major fictional work Hemingway published during his lifetime. It tells the story of Santiago, an aging fisherman, and his long struggle to catch a giant marlin.

Hemingway began writing The Old Man and the Sea in Cuba during a tumultuous period in his life. His previous novel Across the River and Into the Trees had met with negative reviews and, amid a breakdown in relations with his wife Mary, he had fallen in love with his muse Adriana Ivancich. Having completed one book in a planned "sea trilogy", Hemingway began to write as an addendum a story about an old man and a marlin that had originally been told to him fifteen years earlier. He wrote up to a thousand words a day, completing the 26,531-word manuscript in six weeks.

Over the following year, Hemingway became increasingly convinced that the manuscript would stand on its own as a novella. Life magazine published the full novella in its September 1, 1952, issue. Hemingway's publisher, Scribner's, released their first edition a week later on the 8th. Thanks to favorable early reviews and word-of-mouth, popular anticipation was so high that both releases were heavily bootlegged. The magazine sold a record 5.3 million copies in two days, while Scribner's sold tens of thousands of copies. Translated into nine languages by the end of 1952, The Old Man and the Sea remained on the New York Times bestseller list for six months. In 1953, it received the Pulitzer Prize for Fiction, and it was the only work explicitly mentioned when Hemingway was awarded the Nobel Prize in Literature in 1954.

Early reviews were positive, with many hailing what they saw as a return to form for Hemingway after Across the River's negative reception. The acclaim lessened over time, as literary critics began to think the initial reception overblown and over-enthusiastic. Whether The Old Man and the Sea is inferior or equal to Hemingway's other works has since been the subject of scholarly debate. Thematic analysis has focused on Christian imagery and symbolism, on the similarity of the novella's themes to its predecessors in the Hemingway canon, and on the character of the fisherman Santiago.

== Plot ==
Santiago is an elderly fisherman who has not caught a fish in eighty-four days and is considered salao (very unlucky). Manolin, a boy trained by Santiago, has been forced by his parents to work on a different, luckier boat; Manolin still helps Santiago prepare his gear every morning and evening and brings him food. They talk about baseball and Joe DiMaggio, before the boy leaves and Santiago sleeps. He dreams of the sights and experiences of his youth.

On the eighty-fifth day of his streak, Santiago takes his skiff out early, intending to row far into the Gulf Stream. He catches nothing except a small albacore in the morning before hooking a huge marlin. The fish is too heavy to haul in and begins to tow the skiff farther out to sea. Santiago holds on through the night, eating the albacore after sunrise. He sees the marlin for the first time—it is longer than the boat. Santiago increasingly appreciates the fish, showing respect and compassion towards his adversary. Sunset arrives for a second time and the fisherman manages some sleep; he is awoken by the fish panicking but manages to recover his equilibrium. On the third morning the marlin begins to circle. Almost delirious, Santiago draws the marlin in and harpoons it. He lashes the fish to his boat.

A mako shark smells blood in the water and takes a forty-pound bite of the marlin. Killing the shark but losing his harpoon, Santiago lashes his knife to an oar as a makeshift spear and kills three more sharks before the knife blade snaps. Cursing himself for going out too far, he apologizes to the mutilated carcass of the marlin. He clubs two more sharks at sunset, but the marlin is now half-eaten. In the third night, the sharks come as a pack and leave only bones behind them. Santiago reaches shore and sleeps in his shack, leaving the skeleton tied to his skiff.

In the morning, Manolin cries when he sees Santiago's state. He brings coffee and sits with Santiago until he wakes. He insists on accompanying Santiago in the future. A fisherman measures the marlin at eighteen feet long, and a pair of tourists mistake its skeleton for that of a shark. Santiago goes back to sleep and dreams of lions on an African beach.

== Background and publication ==
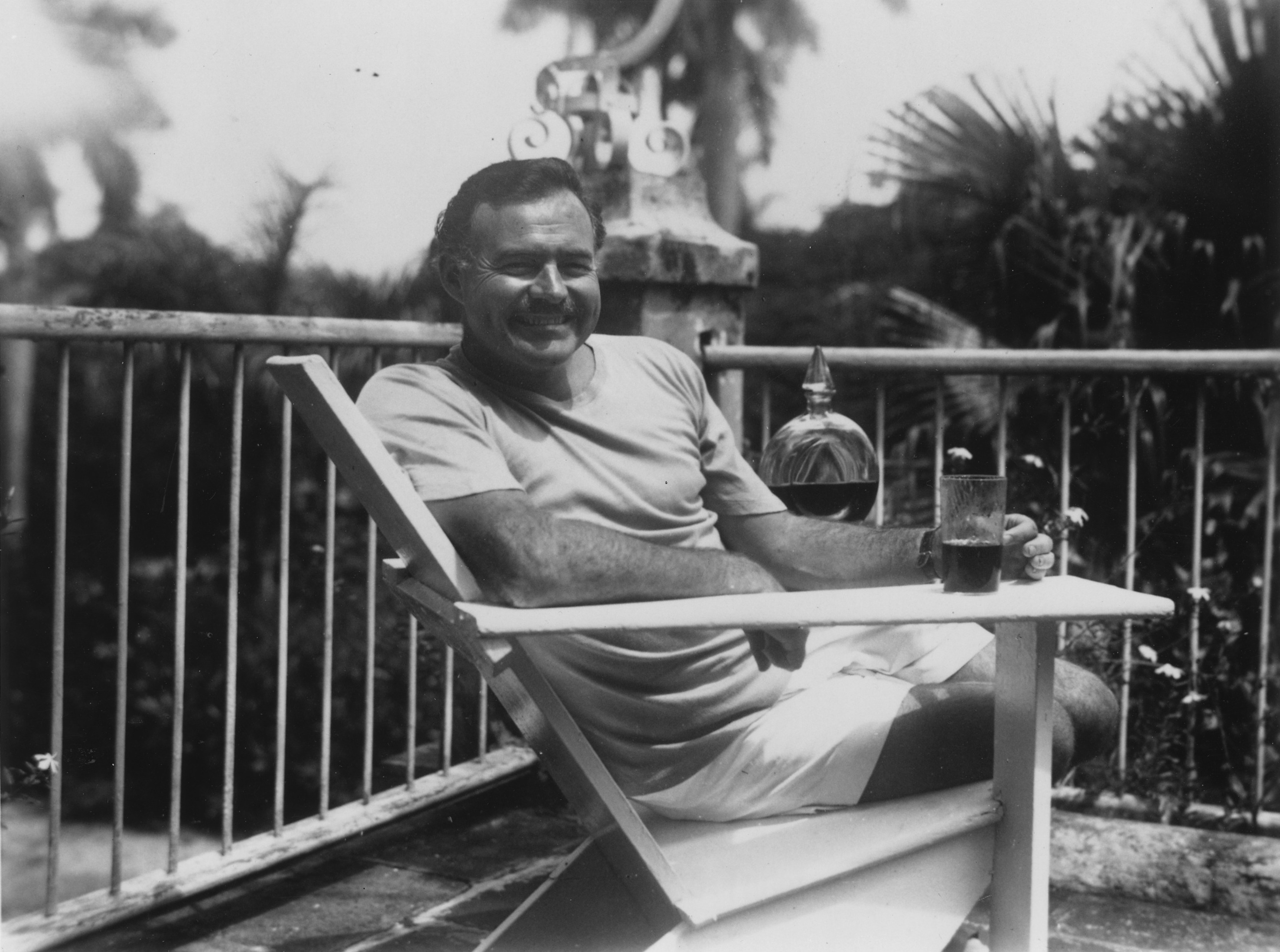
Hemingway at the Finca Vigía, his Cuban residence where he wrote The Old Man and the Sea, in 1946.

The Old Man and the Sea was Ernest Hemingway's sixth major novel, following The Sun Also Rises (1926), A Farewell to Arms (1929), To Have and Have Not (1937), For Whom the Bell Tolls (1940), and Across the River and Into the Trees (1950). Although the latter, published on September 7, sold 75,000 copies in its first month and remained on the New York Times bestseller list for twenty-one weeks, critical reception was largely negative. Amid a breakdown in marital relations with his wife Mary, Hemingway fell deeper into love with his muse, the young Italian Adriana Ivancich, who spent the winter of 1950–1951 in the Hemingways' company in Cuba. Suddenly finding himself able to write in early December, he completed one book (published in 1970 as Islands in the Stream) of a planned "sea trilogy", and, as his passion for Ivancich cooled, set about writing another story.

In the mid-1930s, the Cuban guide Carlos Gutiérrez had related a story involving an old man and a giant marlin to Hemingway, who retold it in Esquire magazine in an essay titled "On the Blue Water: A Gulf Stream Letter". According to Mary Cruz, this tale was likely first told by the Cuban author Ramón Meza y Suárez Inclán in 1891 and was consistently retold by fishermen over the next forty years. Significant influence came from Hemingway's own experience with the Gulf Stream, where he sailed for thousands of hours in the decades before writing The Old Man and the Sea. He greatly enjoyed the sport of big-game fishing, participating in and winning several tournaments, and he also became an avid amateur naturalist, inviting luminaries such as Henry Weed Fowler and Charles Cadwalader to record and describe catches on his boat, the Pilar. During a single month on board, aided by Hemingway's skill in fishing and sailing, the ichthyologist Fowler learnt enough to "revise the classification of marlin for the whole North Atlantic."

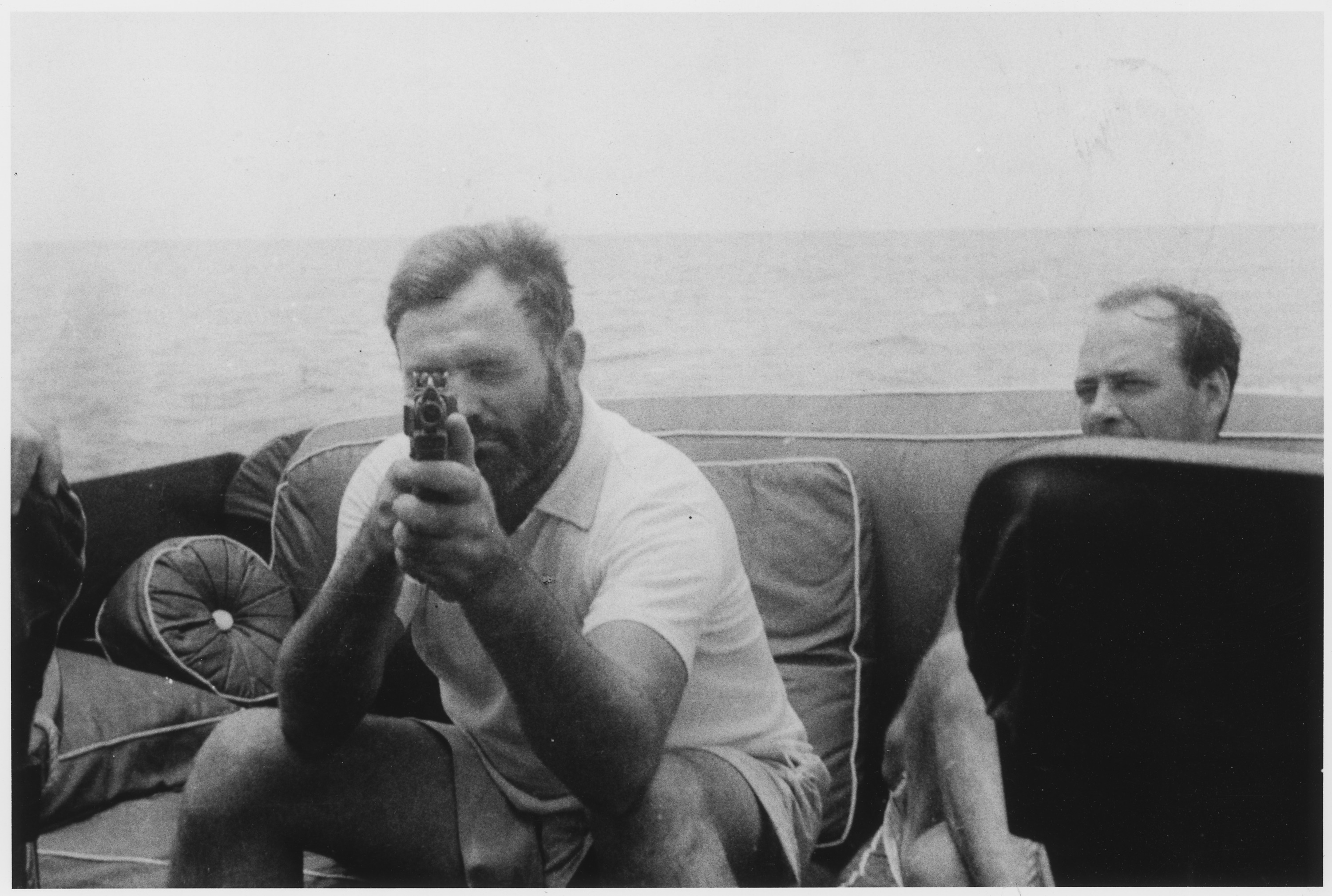
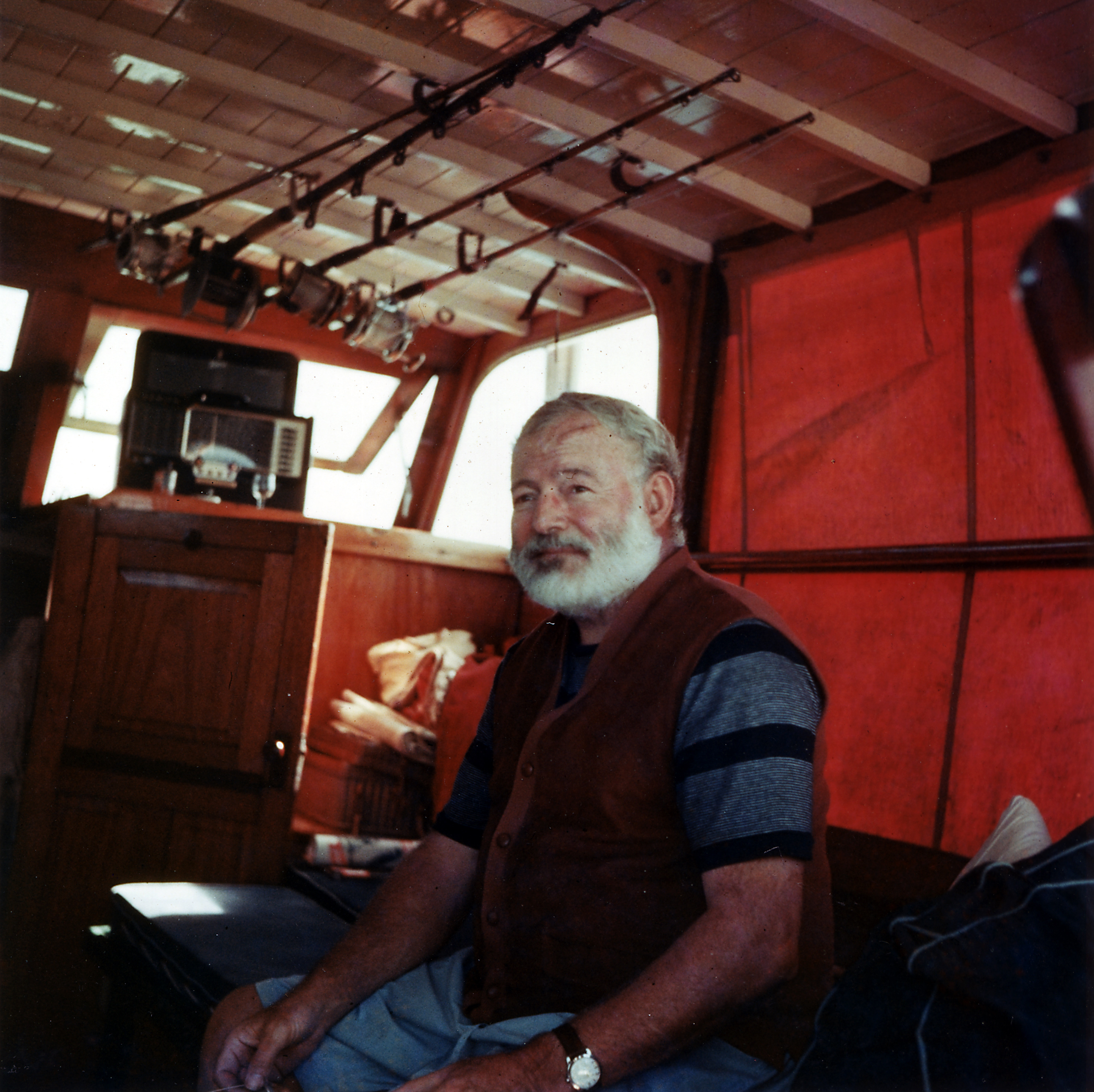
Hemingway on board the Pilar in 1935 (top) and c. 1950 (bottom)

Having put off a novelization for sixteen years, but aided by his love and knowledge of fishing and the sea, Hemingway suddenly found himself writing a thousand words a day—twice as fast as usual. Although Ivancich's departure on February 7, 1951, caused Hemingway some disquiet, the novella was essentially finished by February 17; Mary, who read each day's production in the evenings, commented that she was "prepared to pardon [Hemingway] for all the disagreeable things [he] had done." Hemingway was himself struck by the quality of this seemingly simple story, which he had written in little more than six weeks. Over the next few months, he sent copies to trusted friends and associates including his publisher Charles Scribner and his friend A. E. Hotchner, who all responded very positively.

The 26,531-word manuscript was held in temporary abeyance for over a year, during which time Hemingway became increasingly certain he wished to publish it on its own merits, rather than as an addendum to the "sea trilogy". Conversations with Leland Hayward and Wallace Meyer encouraged him in this direction—Hemingway was delighted when Hayward secured the publication of the entire novella in one issue of Life magazine in May 1952. As he wrote to Meyer, Hemingway wished to rebuff the idea he should only write War and Peace or Crime and Punishment-like novels. He rejected the initial cover designs from his publisher Charles Scribner's Sons, and asked Ivancich to draw a set of sketches which he found much more suitable. He had intended to dedicate the book to Mary and to his boat, the Pilar, but changed his mind on Memorial Day when thinking about friends he had lost; Mary generously accepted the new dedication, to Scribner and Max Perkins. Events moved slowly yet positively during the summer. Hemingway's old adversary William Faulkner released a highly positive review, and word-of-mouth reached such proportions that both the Life and Scribner's editions were heavily bootlegged.

Life released their Labor Day printing, containing the first publication of The Old Man and the Sea, on September 1, 1952; they sold a record 5.3 million copies in two days. Advanced sales of Scribner's edition in America and Jonathan Cape's edition in Britain reached a total of 70,000, and afterwards combined weekly sales in the two countries averaged 5,000. It remained on the New York Times bestseller list for twenty-six weeks and had been translated into nine languages by the start of 1953.

== Reception and legacy ==
The Old Man and the Sea met with popular acclaim. In the three weeks after publication, Hemingway received more than eighty letters a day from well-wishers, and Life received many more. Religious figures began to cite the book's themes in their sermons. Critical reception was initially equally positive, placing the novella as superior in quality to Across the River and equal to Hemingway's earliest works. With Time magazine labeling it a "masterpiece", Cyril Connolly praised "the best story Hemingway has ever written" and Mark Schorer noted that Hemingway's "incomparable" work set him apart as "the greatest craftsman in the American novel in this century". Many reviewers, seeing it as "the apex of the Hemingway canon", termed it a "classic". Hemingway's favorite review was from the art historian Bernard Berenson, who wrote that The Old Man and the Sea was superior to Herman Melville's Moby-Dick and equal in many ways to the Homeric epics.

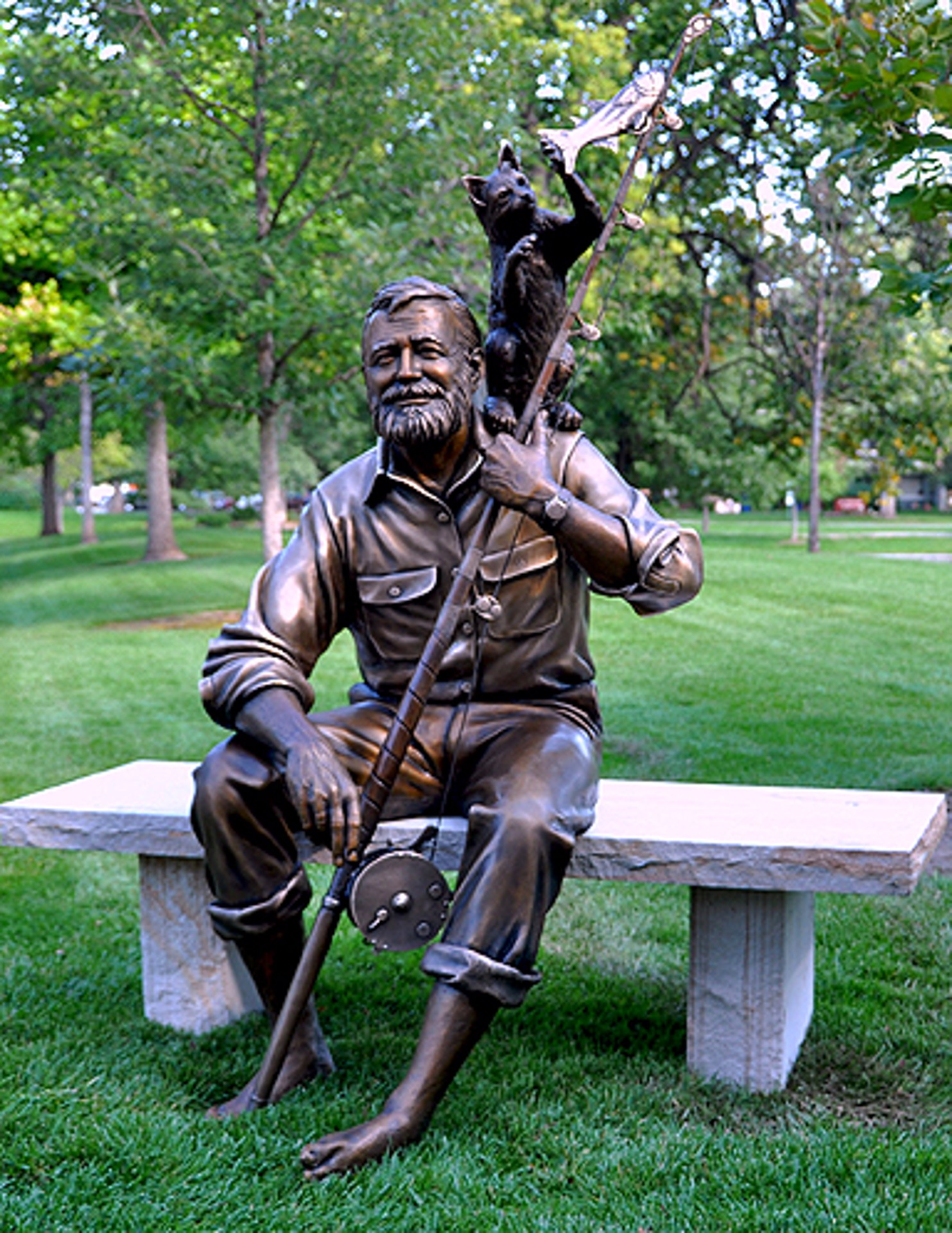
The Old Man and the Cat by George Lundeen, inspired by Hemingway's story

After the early adulation faded, less positive reviews began to appear. Delmore Schwartz believed that the initial reviewers had prejudiced public opinion in their relief that the novella was not as bad as Across the River. Seymour Krim wrote that The Old Man and the Sea was "only more of the same", while John W. Aldridge felt himself "unable to share in the prevailing wild enthusiasm" for the novella. Years later, Jeffrey Meyers called it Hemingway's "most overrated work", a "mock-serious fable" with "radical weaknesses". Despite the cooling critical outlook, The Old Man and the Sea won the Pulitzer Prize for Fiction on May 4, 1953—this was the first time Hemingway had received the award, having been overlooked previously for A Farewell to Arms and For Whom the Bell Tolls. He also accepted a Medal of Honor from Fulgencio Batista's newly established Cuban dictatorship, despite personally disapproving of the new regime. The Old Man and the Sea's highest recognition came on October 28, 1954, as the only work of Hemingway's mentioned by the Swedish Academy when awarding him the Nobel Prize in Literature; they praised its "powerful, style-making mastery of the art of modern narration".

The Old Man and the Sea has been the subject of a significant amount of critical commentary that has changed over the generations. Wirt Williams noted that early scholarship focused upon "the naturalistic tragedy, the Christian tragedy, the parable of art and the artist, and even the autobiographical mode". Analysis of these themes continued into the 1960s, during which John Killinger connected the novella with Albert Camus, Jean-Paul Sartre, and Friedrich Nietzsche, and Richard Hovey linked its themes to the Oedipus complex. However, Philip Young's republication of Ernest Hemingway: A Reconsideration in 1966 was much less positive than the original edition in 1952, setting the disinterested scholarly tone that would dominate the next decades. Analysis only restarted in earnest with the publication of Gerry Brenner's hyper-critical The Old Man and the Sea: The Story of a Common Man in 1991, and has continued unabated since.

Writing in 1985, Meyers noted that The Old Man and the Sea was used in English lessons in schools worldwide and continued to earn $100,000 per year in royalties. According to the CIA, it was a favorite book of Saddam Hussein, who saw himself, like Santiago, as "struggl[ing] against overwhelming odds with courage, perseverance, and dignity". The Big Read, a 2003 survey of the United Kingdom's 200 "best-loved novels" conducted by the BBC, listed The Old Man and the Sea at number 173. Hemingway was directly involved in making a 1958 film adaptation starring Spencer Tracy. Production was marred by numerous difficulties and although the film soundtrack, composed by Dimitri Tiomkin, won the Academy Award for Best Original Score, Hemingway heartily disliked the final film. Two more adaptations have been produced: a 1990 television film starring Anthony Quinn, and a 1999 production by Aleksandr Petrov which won the Academy Award for Best Animated Short Film.

== Critical analysis ==
=== Quality and accuracy ===
Some literary critics find The Old Man and the Sea inferior to Hemingway's earlier works. Dwight Macdonald criticizes the pseudo-archaic prose which pretends to be high culture. He compares the novella unfavorably with Hemingway's earlier works; he deplored The Old Man and the Sea as garrulous and repetitive when compared to the "disciplined, businesslike understatement" of The Undefeated, a short story Hemingway wrote in 1927. Similarly, Brenner characterizes the novella as riddled with amateurish mistakes in style and prose. Meyers criticizes The Old Man and the Sea's melodrama, symbolism, and irony, concluding, like Macdonald, that "Hemingway either deceived himself about the profundity of his art" or expertly satisfied the desires of a pretentious audience.

Robert Weeks notes that the novella abounds in factual impossibilities—he cites Santiago's near-clairvoyance in identifying fishes and judging weather patterns. Weeks maintains that Hemingway—previously criticized for his distaste for narrative invention—had instilled insincerity at the heart of his novel. He concluded that The Old Man and the Sea is "an inferior Hemingway novel." Bickford Sylvester comments that most of the errors Weeks outlined were based upon faults in then-current science, and some others were intended to nudge readers towards the work's subtext and deepest details. Sylvester argues that seemingly-implausible narrative details in The Old Man and the Sea are actually hints. He cites the baseball conversation between Santiago and Manolin, which subtly indicates not only the precise dates of the novella's events (September 12–16, 1950) but also parallels the fisherman with his hero DiMaggio, also the son of a fisherman, who similarly resurged in performance during that week.

=== Classical themes ===
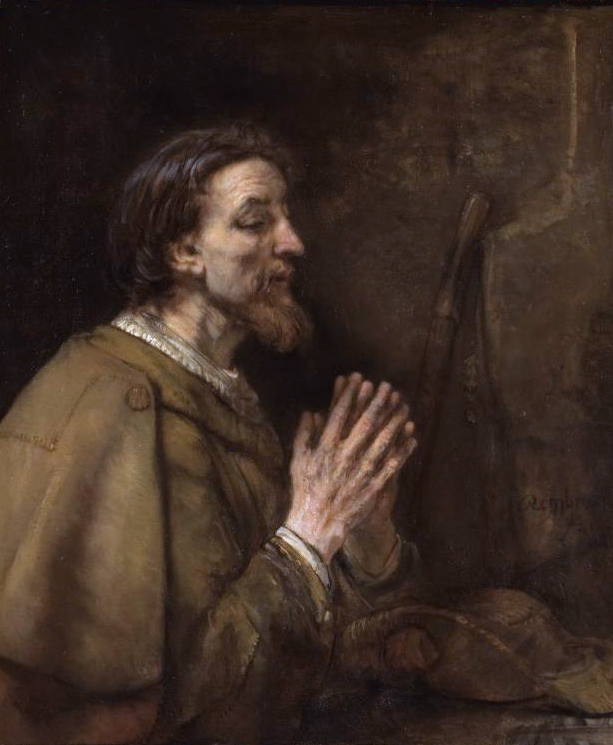
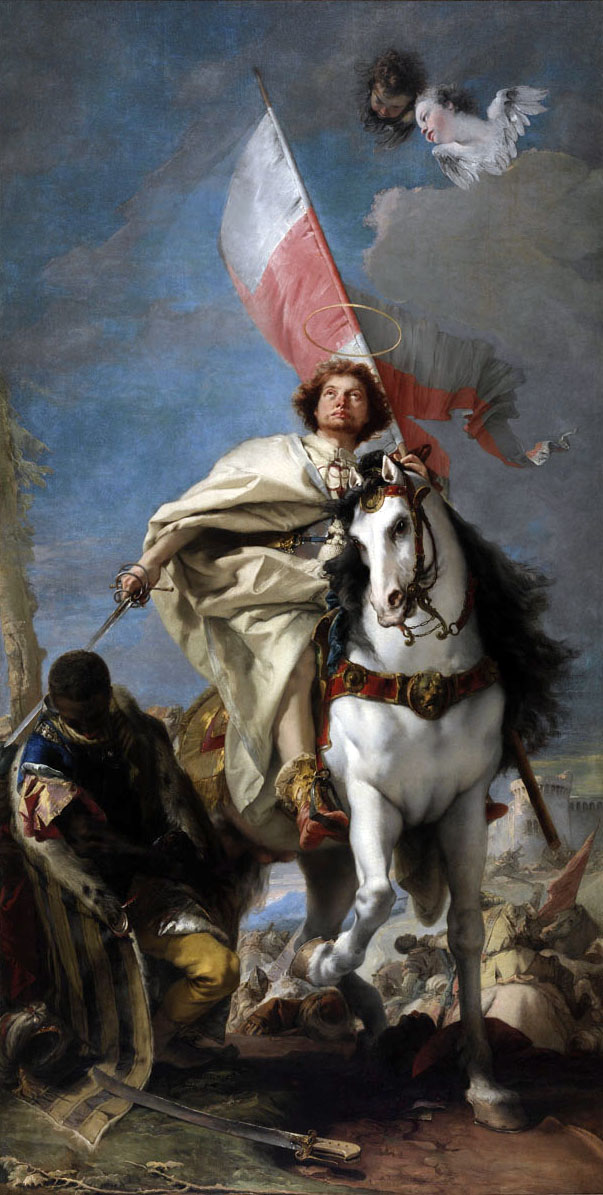
Different depictions of St. James, Santiago's namesake.
Left: James, the Pilgrim Saint, painted by Rembrandt in 1661.
Right: The warrior James Matamoros, painted by Tiepolo in 1749–1750.

The novella contains significant Christian symbolism. The name "Santiago" is Spanish for St. James, the Apostle who had previously, according to the New Testament, been a fisherman, and who posthumously became the patron saint of Spain with his shrine at Santiago de Compostela. In a letter to a Father Brown in 1954, Hemingway wrote "You know about Santiago and you know that the name is no accident"; the academic H. R. Stoneback argues that this means The Old Man and the Sea has deep connections to the pilgrimage to Santiago, which is also heavily drawn upon in The Sun Also Rises. Stoneback draws an explicit link between the events of the novella and the miraculous catch of fish in the Gospel of Luke—both involve fishermen experiencing bad luck, going out into the deep sea, and taking a great catch; he also connects repeated allusions to stars in Hemingway's text to the traditional Latin etymology of "Compostela"—campus stellae (lit. 'field of stars'). Stoneback argues that Hemingway emphasises "the humility and gentleness, the poverty, resolution and endurance of St. James the pilgrim" while de-emphasising the warrior James Matamoros; this choice "reconstruct[s] the paradigm of sainthood".

One of Santiago's credos is that "a man can be destroyed but not defeated", a theme which is present in most of Hemingway's protagonists and stories, from Jake Barnes in The Sun Also Rises to Robert Jordan in For Whom the Bell Tolls, and Richard Cantwell in Across the River; it is also a primary theme in To Have and Have Not. Backman views Santiago as the climactic "matador" of Hemingway's works, who manages to seek a type of natural violence quite unlike the "violent ritualized" bullfighting or "uneasily insistent" killing found in previous novels. Joseph Waldmeir similarly finds The Old Man and the Sea to contain a better synthesis of Hemingway's views on mortality than works such as Death in the Afternoon (1932).

Many critics have drawn parallels not only between Santiago and St. James, but between Santiago and Jesus himself, especially with regard to Christ's Passion and crucifixion. Melvin Backman outlines several, beginning with the Santiago's wish to "rest gently ... against the wood and think of nothing"; Sylvester, Grimes, and Hays also cite the preceding scene, in which Santiago is cut and bleeds from near the eye, as a stigmatic evocation of the wounds inflicted by the crown of thorns. An often-cited passage occurs when Santiago spots two sharks:

"Ay," he said aloud. There is no translation for this word and perhaps it is just a noise such as a man might make, involuntarily, feeling the nail go through his hands and into the wood.

This passage was characterized by Sylvester, Grimes, and Hays as "a clear reference to a crucifixion"; taking place, like Christ's death, at three o'clock on a Friday afternoon, it acts as the climax of the religious parallels. Brenner finds the Christian allusions deeply problematic, commenting that the "facile linking of Santiago's name with Christ's" was unnecessary and disrespectful towards the New Testament. Dismissing both Brenner's conclusion and any approach which defines Santiago as a Christ-figure as overly simplistic, Stoneback argues that the figure of Santiago ultimately embodied Hemingway's ideals, and was intended to be esteemed as such.

=== Modern themes ===
Brenner's 1991 critique characterizes Santiago as a supremely flawed individual: unintelligent, arrogant, paternalist, and anti-environmentalist. He criticizes the fisherman's inability to ignore economic considerations as he loots the sea of its treasures. He further commented that Santiago, portrayed as blatantly sexist and hostile towards all things female, was in fact feminized by his secret desire for Manolin, who was himself alternately traumatized and manipulated by Santiago's aggression and duplicity. Brenner's analysis has been strongly criticized: Stoneback terms it a "jejune litany of ... shock-schlock critical fast-food [and] tired old questions", while Sylvester, Grimes, and Hays notes that "much of the book reeks of rabid exaggeration and misreading". In answer to Glen Love's similar ecologist critiques, they write that both Brenner and Love dismiss economic realities and ask the uneducated Santiago to consider problems that few outside biology cared about in 1950.

Susan Beegel, analyzing The Old Man and the Sea from an ecofeminist perspective, rejects Brenner's view of Santiago's sexism; instead, she writes that Santiago is in effect wedded to and at the service of the female sea. Beegel nevertheless characterizes Santiago as viewing the feminine sea as tumultuous, cruel, and chaotic, and thus in need of being overcome by male power. Sylvester, Grimes, and Hays disagree, viewing Santiago's approach as wholly respectful. Jeffrey Herlihy-Mera comments that even though Santiago is firmly embedded in Cuban culture, he dreams about Spain every night; he interprets Santiago's immigrant background as a major and yet invisible aspect in the novella.
