= Julius Schou =

US Army sergeant and Medal of Honor recipient (1849–1929)

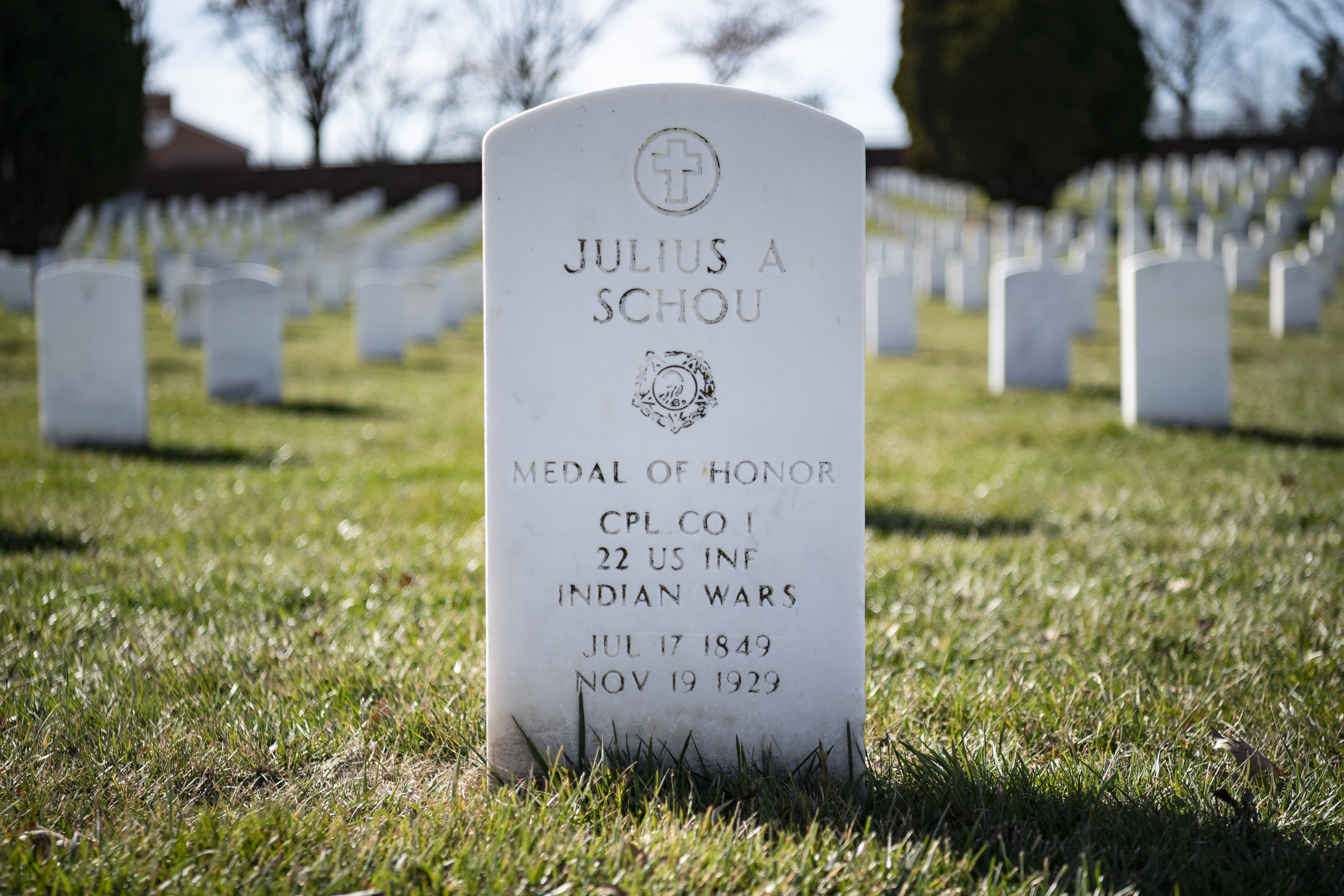
- Grave at Arlington National Cemetery
- Born: July 17, 1849; Copenhagen, Denmark
- Died: November 19, 1929 (aged 80); Arlington, Virginia, United States
- Burial place: Arlington National Cemetery
- Military career
- Allegiance: United States
- Branch: United States Army
- Service years: c. 1875–1896
- Rank: Sergeant
- Unit: 22nd U.S. Infantry
- Conflicts: Indian Wars; Great Sioux War of 1876
- Awards: Medal of Honor

Sergeant Julius Alexis Schou (July 17, 1849 – November 19, 1929) was an American soldier in the U.S. Army who served with the 22nd U.S. Infantry during the Sioux Wars. During the Great Sioux War of 1876, Schou risked his life volunteering to carry dispatches from commanders in the field to Fort Buford. He was eventually recognized for his efforts and received the Medal of Honor on November 19, 1884.

== Biography ==
Julius Alexis Schou was born on July 17, 1849, in Copenhagen, Denmark. He later emigrated to the United States and lived in Brooklyn, New York before enlisting in the United States Army in the mid-to late 1870s. Assigned to frontier duty in the Dakota Territory, he saw considerable action with the 22nd U.S. Infantry Regiment during the Sioux Wars. It was during the Great Sioux War of 1876 that the 27-year-old corporal volunteered to deliver dispatches from Brigadier General Elwell Stephen Otis to General William B. Hazen at Fort Buford, a dangerous task which required Schou to ride long distances though wide-open Indian territory, and was cited for distinguished by his superiors. He received an immediate transfer to Troop G of the 4th U.S. Cavalry Regiment and was promoted to the rank of sergeant. He later received the Medal of Honor in recognition of his actions on November 19, 1884; though he won the award in 1876, his MOH citation was incorrectly dated 1870. Prior to his retirement, he served as a recruiting officer in Seattle and, in 1896, was interviewed by The Spokesman-Review. Schou died on November 19, 1929, at the age of 80, and was interred at Arlington National Cemetery with his wife Irma (1864–1937).

== Medal of Honor citation ==
Rank and organization: Corporal, Company I, 22d U.S. Infantry. Place and date: Sioux Campaign, 1870. Entered service at: — . Birth: Denmark. Date of issue: 19 November 1884.

Citation:

Carried dispatches to Fort Buford.

== See also ==
- List of Medal of Honor recipients for the Indian Wars
