= Adriana Ivancich =

Italian poet (1930–1983)

- Born: 4 January 1930; Venice, Italy
- Died: 24 March 1983 (aged 53); Orbetello, Italy
- Writing career
- Genre: Poetry
- Notable works: Ho guardato il cielo e la terra La torre bianca

Adriana Ivancich (4 January 1930 – 24 March 1983) was an Italian poet and a noblewoman of Dalmatian origin. She was known for her romantic relationship with the writer Ernest Hemingway.

== Biography ==
Adriana Ivancich met Hemingway in 1948 when she was 18 and the writer nearly 50. Despite his marriage, Hemingway fell in love with her, spending time with her in Venice and Cuba. They met for the last time in Italy in May 1954.

Ivancich inspired the figure of Renata in Hemingway's 1950 novel Across the River and into the Trees, which was set in Venice. She provided illustrations for the cover of that book as well as for the 1952 first edition of The Old Man and the Sea.

In 1953, Ivancich published a collection of her own poems, Ho guardato il cielo e la terra (Mondadori), with Hemingway's enthusiastic support. In 1980, she published her own account of her time with Hemingway, La Torre Bianca. In 1983, she died by suicide.

== Selected works ==
- Adriana Ivancich, Ho guardato il cielo e la terra, Milan, Mondadori, 1953.
- Adriana Ivancich, La Torre Bianca, Milan, Mondadori, 1980.
- Andrea di Robilant, Autumn in Venice: Ernest Hemingway and His Last Muse, New York, Knopf, 2018

== In popular culture ==
In the 2024 U&Gold documentary Absolutely Fabulous: Inside Out, Jennifer Saunders explains how Adriana Ivancich, for whom she used to work au pair in Italy when she was a young woman, inspired the eccentricity of the main character of her sitcom Absolutely Fabulous: Edina Monsoon.

== Works cited ==
- Knigge, Jobst C. (2012). "Hemingway's Venetian muse Adriana Ivancich" (PDF). A Contribution to the Biography of Ernest Hemingway.
