= 22nd Infantry Regiment (United States) =

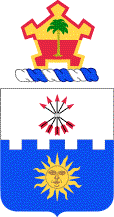
- Coat of arms
- Active: 1861–present
- Country: United States
- Branch: United States Army
- Type: 2nd Bn: light infantry
- Part of: 2nd Bn: 10th Mountain Division
- Garrison/HQ: 2nd Bn: Fort Drum
- Nicknames: Double Deuce, Triple Deuce
- Mottos: Deeds, Not Words
- Engagements: Indian Wars; Civil War; Spanish–American War; Philippine–American War; World War II; Vietnam War; Somali Civil War; War in Afghanistan; Iraq War; Operation Inherent Resolve

Insignia
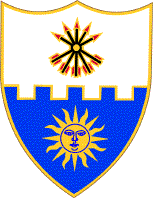
- Distinctive unit insignia

The 22nd Infantry Regiment is a parent regiment of the United States Army. Currently the 2nd Battalion is active, with the regimental colors residing at Fort Drum, New York. The 1st, 3rd, and 4th Battalions have been inactivated.

== Lineage and general regimental history ==
=== Regiment ===
- Constituted 3 May 1861 in the Regular Army as the 2nd Battalion, 13th Infantry Regiment. Organized 15 May 1865 at Camp Dennison, Ohio. Reorganized and redesignated 21 September 1866 as the 22d Infantry Regiment. Consolidated 1–31 May 1869 with the 31st Infantry Regiment (see ANNEX), and consolidated unit designated as the 22d Infantry Regiment.
- Assigned 24 March 1923 to the 4th Division (later redesignated as the 4th Infantry Division). 1st Battalion inactivated 30 June 1927 at Fort McPherson, Georgia and reactivated 1 June 1940 at Fort McClellan, Alabama).
- Inactivated 1 March 1946 at Camp Butner, North Carolina.
- Activated 15 July 1947 at Fort Ord, California for assignment to Germany in the German occupation. Sent to Fort Benning, and subsequently shipped to Bremerhaven, Germany in 1951. 2d Battalion went to Schweinfurt, Germany.
- Relieved 1 April 1957 from assignment to the 4th Infantry Division and reorganized as a parent regiment under the Combat Arms Regimental System.

ANNEX

- Constituted 3 May 1861 in the Regular Army as the 3d Battalion, 13th Infantry Regiment. Organized in December 1865 at Jefferson Barracks, Missouri. Reorganized and redesignated 21 September 1866 as the 31st Infantry Regiment. Consolidated 1–31 May 1869 with the 22d Infantry and consolidated unit designated as the 22d Infantry Regiment.

=== Indian Wars ===
After the American Civil War and garrison duty in the East, the regiment was transferred to the Northern Plains and served in frontier forts. The regiment's efforts included keeping civilians out of the Black Hills of Dakota Territory that had been ceded to the Lakota Sioux in the Fort Laramie Treaty of 1868. In 1869, the 22d Infantry was involved in actions at the Oglala Lakota Pine Ridge Indian Reservation, in South Dakota.

After 1870, the United States Army allowed Black Seminoles from Mexico to serve as army scouts for the United States. These scouts were formally attached to the 22nd, but often served independently. The Seminole Negro Indian Scouts fought in the Texas Indian Wars of the 1870s. The scouts were well known for their tracking abilities and feats of endurance. Four of the 22nd Infantry's Seminole Scouts were awarded the Medal of Honor. After the Texas Indian Wars, the scouts remained stationed at Fort Clark in Brackettville, Texas.

On 8 January 1877, Companies E, and F of the 22d Infantry fought at the Battle of Wolf Mountain on the Tongue River in Montana Territory, and on 7 May 1877, Companies E, F, and G were present at the Battle of Little Muddy Creek. In 1888 the 22d Infantry's regiment headquarters was moved to Fort Keogh, Montana, and would remain there until 1896. In December 1890, and January 1891, the regiment participated in repressing the Ghost Dance on the Sioux Reservation in South Dakota, and in 1891, and 1892 patrolled throughout Montana.

=== Spanish–American War ===
The 22d Infantry Regiment fought at Santiago 3 to 17 July 1898. One of the regimental officers, Captain Edward O. Ord, (son of Major General Edward Otho Cresap Ord and for whom Fort Ord was named) remained in Cuba for nine months as interpreter on the staff of General Alexander R. Lawton while the rest of the regiment prepared for service in the Philippines.

=== Philippine–American War ===
By 1900 the 22d Regiment was en route piecemeal to the Philippines when the Philippine–American War broke out. They participated in battles in Manila, Luzon, Malolos, San Isidro then other battles during the Moro Rebellion on Mindanao and Jolo. On March 18, 1899, two companies of the regiment were ambushed by Filipino insurgents. After receiving exaggerated reports of the ambush which claimed that the regiments had been wiped out, the 2nd Oregon Volunteer Infantry Regiment was ordered to kill all Filipinos in a 12-mile (19 km) district between the mouth of San Mateo River and the lake. By 1905, the regiment had returned to garrison duty in the San Francisco region.

=== San Francisco earthquake ===
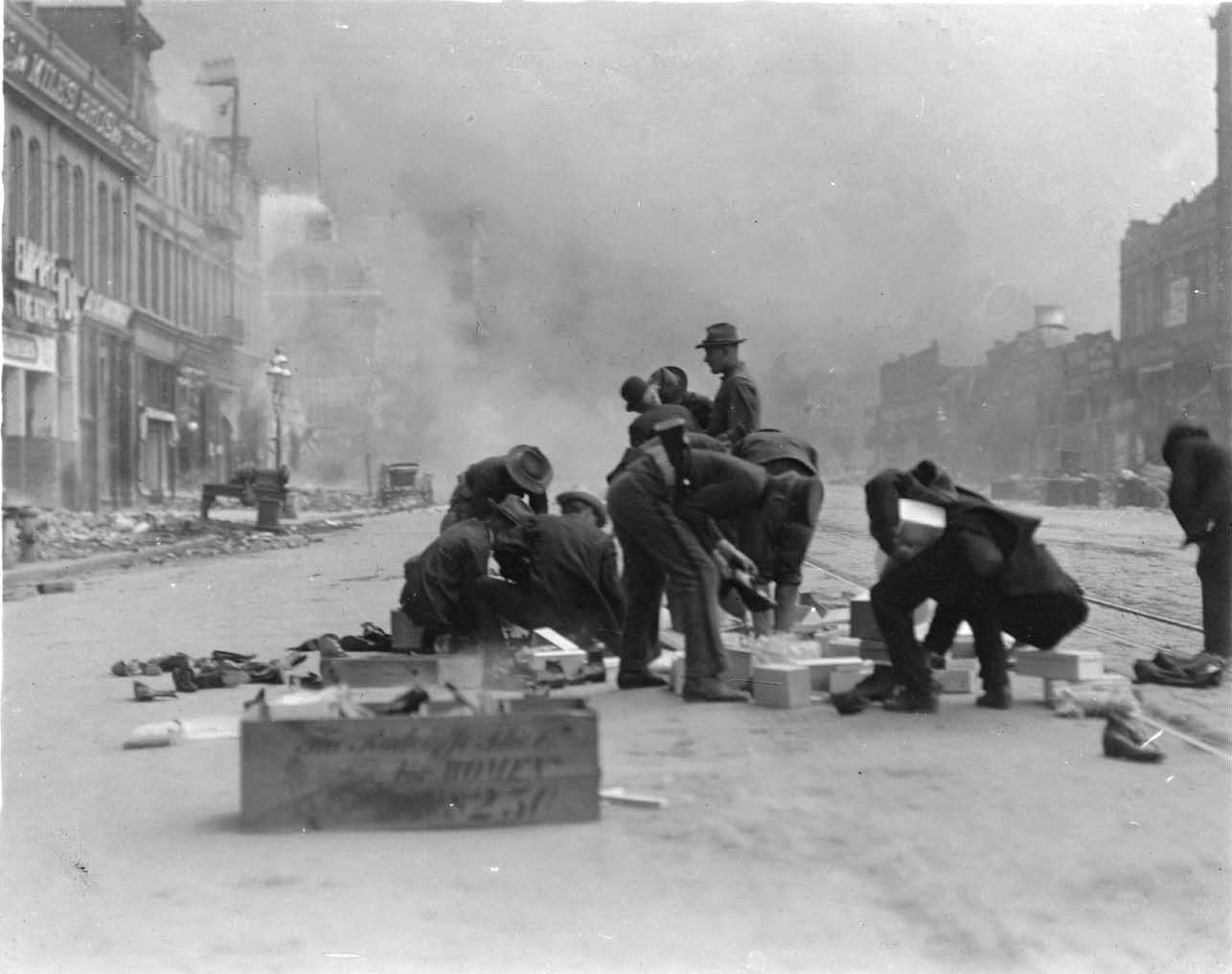
A few soldiers from the 22d Infantry Regt. looting shoes on Market Street (between 7th and 8th) in the aftermath of the 1906 San Francisco earthquake.

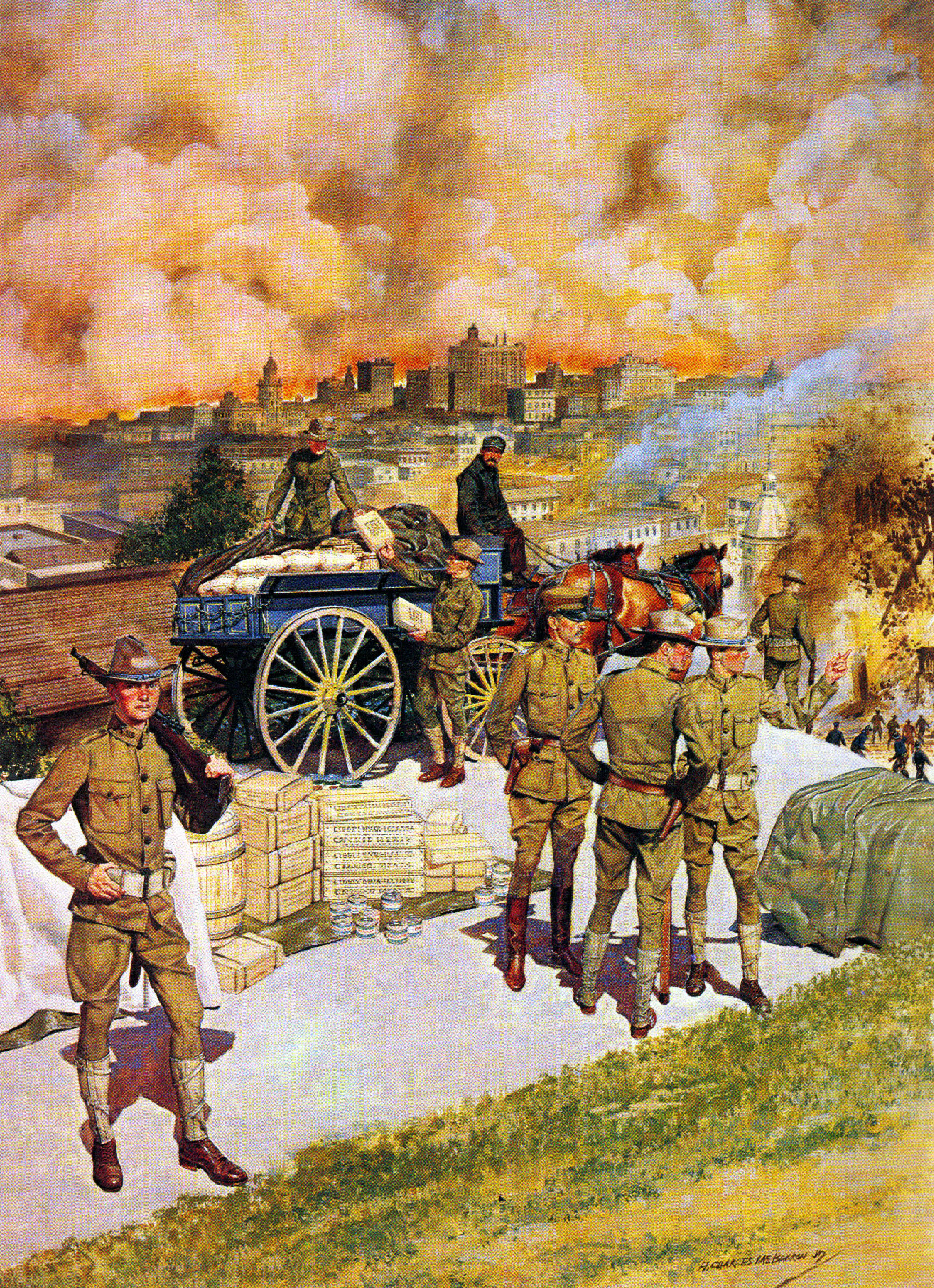
Famous painting Thank God For the Soldiers. Period piece depicting US Army soldiers bringing in critical supplies for the survivors.

On 18 April 1906, just after the 1906 San Francisco earthquake, recently retired Captain Edward Ord of the 22nd Infantry Regiment was appointed a Special Police Officer by San Francisco Mayor Eugene Schmitz and liaisoned with Major General Adolphus Greely for relief work with the 22nd Infantry and other military units involved in the emergency. Ord later wrote a long letter to his mother on 20 April regarding Schmitz's "shoot-to-kill" order and some "despicable" behavior of certain soldiers of his former regiment from the Presidio who were looting. At the same time, Ord also made it clear that the majority of soldiers served the community well.

From June 1908 to August 1910 the 22nd Infantry was posted to Alaska to maintain the Alaskan telegraph line between Fairbanks and Nome. This posting would be one of the last large-scale presence of Army troops since the 1898 gold rush and before the telegraph was replaced with a series of wireless stations. The regiment deployed about two companies each to Fort Seward in Haines, Fort Liscomb in Valdez, Fort St. Michael in St. Michael, Fort Davis in Nome, Fort Gibbon in Tanana, and Fort Egbert in Eagle.

=== World War I ===
From the Presidio, the regiment was called to Mexican border in Arizona during the Mexican Punitive Expedition in early 1916. While not joining in the pursuit of Pancho Villa, they guarded the border region around Douglas, Arizona, and maintained the peace in that area during their time there.

While still in Douglas, Arizona, the 22nd Regiment was set for a return deployment to the Philippines, but orders directed it to the East Coast at Fort Jay on Governors Island in New York, New York, quietly arriving there by train and ferry on 2 April 1917.

Just days later, in the early morning of 6 April 1917, just moments after the declaration of war against Germany, the regiment boarded Coast Guard cutters and seized German owned freighters, passenger ships and shipping terminals along the Hudson River in Hoboken, New Jersey and in New York Harbor. Theirs was the first American military action to be taken in World War I. The docks and piers seized in Hoboken were the basis of the New York Port of Embarkation from where tens of thousands of troops would depart to France, with the German cruise ships serving as troop transports.

The regiment was the largest organized combat-ready Army presence in New York City during the war where it was engaged in homeland protection duties: guarding tunnels, bridges, rail lines and other important transportation infrastructure that moved troops and material for the war to the city and port. One battalion was also posted to Washington, D.C. as the primary Army presence in that city, where they also protected vital transportation and military infrastructure.

=== Interwar period ===
The 22nd Infantry was stationed at Fort Jay as of June 1919 as a separate regiment. It provided guards for the subtreasury building at Wall and Nassau Streets after the 16 September 1920 Wall Street bombing by a Marxist dissident. The 2nd Battalion was transferred in 1921 to Fort Niagara, New York. The 3rd Battalion was transferred to Fort Ontario, New York. The entire regiment was transferred on 14 June 1922 to Fort McPherson, Georgia, and assigned to the 4th Division on 24 March 1923. The 3rd Battalion was transferred on 27 May 1927 to Fort Oglethorpe, Georgia. The 1st Battalion was inactivated 30 June 1927 at Fort McPherson. Company M was awarded the Edwin Howard Clark trophy for machine gun marksmanship for 1931. In April 1933, the regiment assumed command and control of Civilian Conservation Corps (CCC) District B, Fourth Corps Area. The regiment assumed command and control of CCC District D, Fourth Corps Area in May 1935 from the 69th Coast Artillery. The 3rd Battalion was transferred on 28 May 1935 to Fort McClellan, Alabama. Assigned Reserve officers conducted summer training with the regiment at Fort McClellan. The entire regiment was transferred in July 1940 to Fort McClellan, and was transferred 21 February 1941 to Fort Benning, Georgia.

=== World War II ===
The 22nd then moved to Camp Gordon, Georgia on 27 December 1941, where it was reorganized under a "motorized" table of organization and equipment (TO&E) on 9 September 1942.

The regiment moved to Fort Dix, New Jersey on 16 April 1943, where it was reorganized under a regular infantry TO&E on 1 August 1943. The regiment continued to train for combat, moving on to Camp Gordon Johnston, Florida on 28 September 1943, and to Fort Jackson, South Carolina on 1 December 1943. 22nd IR subsequently got its Port Call orders, and staged at Camp Kilmer, New Jersey on 8 January 1944 until it shipped out from the New York Port of Embarkation on 18 January 1944.

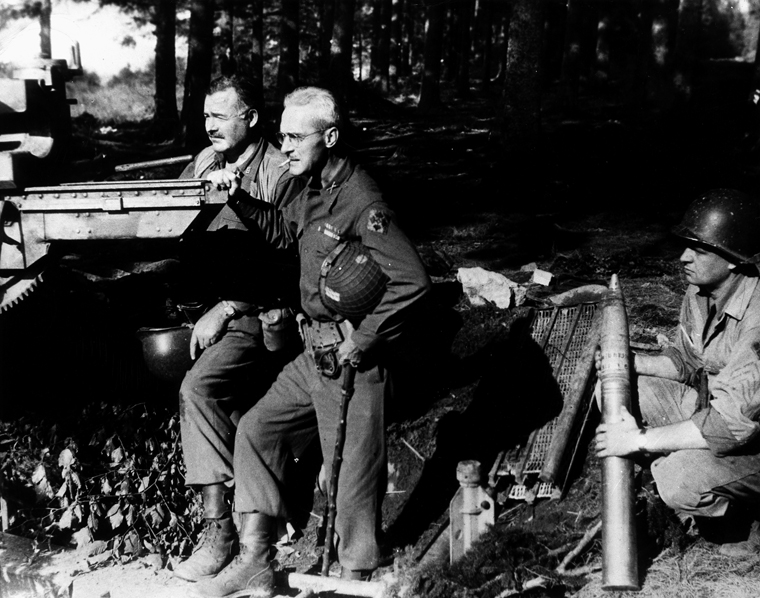
Hemingway and Col. Lanham in Schnee Eifel, Germany, 18 September 1944

The regiment arrived in England on 29 January 1944, settled in near Plymouth, England, and started preparations to assault Utah Beach.

The regiment assaulted Utah Beach on 6 June 1944, as part of VII Corps in the D-Day Invasion and arrived in the vicinity of Ravenoville, Normandy, by the end of D-day. It then participated in the Cherbourg Peninsula operation while attached to 2nd Armored Division from 19 July through 2 August 1944.

The regiment then returned to 4th Infantry Division and headed for Belgium as part of the Operation Cobra, moved into Belgium on 6 September 1944, and entered Germany on 11 September 1944. On 14 September its 3d Battalion broke through the Siegfried Line near Buchet, but neither the regiment nor other formations of 4th Division were able to exploit a success because of rough terrain lacking good roads, bad weather hampering air and artillery support and several other causes. These developments were described by Ernest Hemingway in his article War in the Siegfried Line.

The regiment was attached to 83rd Infantry Division between 3–7 December 1944, and then returned to 4th Infantry Division in Luxembourg on 12 December 1944. The 22d then moved to Belgium on 28 January 1945, and re-entered Germany on 7 February 1945, where it remained on mop-up and occupation until 12 July 1945, when it returned to the New York POE, and moved to its temporary home at Camp Butner, North Carolina while the regiment trained for movement to Japan; however, the war in the Pacific terminated, and the regiment remained at Camp Butner until it was inactivated on 5 March 1946.

== 1st Battalion ==
The 1st Battalion, 22d Infantry Regiment, was originally constituted on 3 May 1861 in the Regular Army as Companies A and I, 2nd Battalion, 13th Infantry. It organized in May 1865 at Camp Dennison, Ohio. It reorganized and was redesignated on 21 September 1866 as Companies A and I, 22nd Infantry.

Companies A and I, 22nd Infantry consolidated on 4 May 1869 and the consolidated unit was designated as Company A, 22d Infantry; the 22nd Infantry being assigned on 24 March 1923 to the 4th Division [later redesignated as the 4th Infantry Division]. It inactivated on 30 June 1927 at Fort McPherson, Georgia.

The unit reactivated on 1 June 1940 at Fort McClellan, Alabama, before inactivating on 1 March 1946 at Camp Butner, North Carolina.

It reactivated 15 July 1947 at Fort Ord, California. It reorganized and was redesignated on 1 April 1957 as Headquarters and Headquarters Company, 1st Battle Group, 22d Infantry and remained assigned to the 4th Infantry Division (with its organic elements being concurrently constituted and activated).

It was reorganized and redesignated on 1 October 1963 as the 1st Battalion, 22d Infantry. It was deployed to South Vietnam as part of the 2d Brigade of the 4th Infantry Division and conducted operations in the Central Highlands.

It was inactivated in August 1984 at Fort Carson, Colorado and relieved from its assignment to the 4th Infantry Division (Mechanized).

It was reactivated in May 1986 at Fort Drum, New York and assigned to the 10th Mountain Division (Light). The battalion deployed to combat in Somalia in 1993 as a part of the 10th Mountain Division. Relieved in February 1996 from this assignment to the 10th Mountain Division (Light), the 1st Battalion was reassigned to the 4th Infantry Division (Mechanized) at Fort Hood, Texas.

Soldiers from the 1st Battalion, 22d Infantry, deployed in late April 2002 to become part of Joint Task Force 160, deployed to Guantanamo Bay Naval Base, Cuba. Approximately 200 soldiers from the 1st Battalion were tasked with providing external security for the detainee facilities. The battalion deployed twice from April–July and again from September–December 2002. This included fixed site security, patrols, observation posts, a quick reaction force, and also playing a role in escorting and transporting detainees. The soldiers of the 22d Infantry were awarded the Joint Meritorious Unit Award for their outstanding service in Cuba during this period.

=== Operation Iraqi Freedom ===
==== OIF I ====
In March 2003, the 1st Battalion, 22nd Infantry, deployed to Iraq with the 4th Infantry Division as a part of its 1st Brigade. Originally commanded by Lieutenant Colonel Mark Woempner from March through June 2003, the battalion secured Tikrit in northern Iraq. After changing command in the "Birthday Palace" in Tikrit 11 June 2003 was commanded by Lieutenant Colonel Steven Russell and was instrumental in the hunt and eventual capture of Saddam Hussein during Operation Red Dawn, on 13 December 2003. It was decorated with a Valorous Unit Award for its service during this period. The battalion redeployed from Iraq to Fort Hood, Texas, in April 2004.

==== OIF III ====
In December 2005, under the command of LTC Craig Osborne, the 1st Battalion, 22d Infantry once again deployed with the 1st Brigade Combat Team, 4th Infantry Division to Iraq to serve for one year in the Baghdad area. During this time, the battalion secured their area of operations, engaged in assisting the local population, and fought against the extremist groups.

Soldiers who did not return home: CPL Nathaniel Aguirre (died 22 October 2006), SPC Matthew Creed (died 22 October 2006), SGT Luis Montes (died 7 September 2006), SGT Chase Haag (died 1 October 2006), PFC Sean Tharp (died 28 March 2006), SPC Ronald Gebur (died 30 May 2006), CPL Bobby West (died 30 May 2006), 2LT Johnny Craver (died 13 October 2006), PFC Kevin Ellenburg (died 1 November 2006), SPC William Hayes (died 5 February 2006), 2LT Christopher Loudon (died 17 October 2006), CPL Joseph Dumas, Jr. (died 17 October 2006), CPL David Unger (died 17 October 2006), SPC Russell Culbertson (died 17 October 2006), CPL Marcus Cain (died 14 September 2006), SGT Jennifer Hartman (died 14 September 2006), and SGT Brandon Asbury (died 4 October 2006).

The battalion redeployed from Iraq to Fort Hood, Texas in December 2006. Once established at Fort Hood, Texas, the battalion immediately began preparations for another Operation Iraqi Freedom deployment.

==== OIF 07-09 ====
In March 2008, under the command of LTC Matt Elledge, the 1st Battalion, 22d Infantry deployed with the 1st Brigade Combat Team, 4th Infantry Division to Iraq for a third time to conduct operations in the Baghdad area. In March 2009, the battalion returned to Fort Hood, Texas having restored civil order in southwestern Baghdad. Upon returning home from Iraq, the battalion was awarded the Valorous Unit Award for displaying "extraordinary heroism in action against an armed enemy in support of Operation Iraqi Freedom" and "the unit demonstrated the ability to innovate and accomplish the mission beyond the call of duty."

Soldiers who did not return home: CPT Andrew "Drew" Pearson (HHC Commander) (died 30 April 2008), SPC Ronald Tucker (died 30 April 2008), and CPL Steven Thompson (died 14 February 2009). In the summer of 2009, the battalion moved with the 4th Infantry Division to Fort Carson, Colorado to prepare for future operations.

OEF - Afghanistan

From August 2010 to June 2011 the battalion served in Kandahar Province, Afghanistan, adding another combat theater to their long history of overseas deployments. The battalion returned to Fort Carson, where they served and continued to train, maintaining a state of readiness should the nation require their service anywhere in the world.

From February to October 2013 1st Battalion deployed to Camp Buehring, Kuwait.

Inactivation

1st Battalion, 22d Infantry was inactivated at Fort Carson, Colorado, on 17 March 2014. The 2d Battalion remains with the 10th Mountain Division at Fort Drum. The Regimental Colors have been transferred to Fort Drum.

=== Companies ===
The 1st Battalion, 22d Infantry Regiment was one of the first Combat Arms Battalions to be aligned under the Combined Arms model, which includes two mechanized infantry companies, two tank companies, an engineer company, and a forward support company (FSC).

- HHC "Hammer"
- A Company "Gator"
- B Company "Blackhawk"
- C Company "Cobra"
- D Company "Death Dealer"
- E Company "Killer"
- E / FSC "Eliminator"

==== Specialty platoons ====
- Scout Platoon "Comanche"
- Mortar Platoon "Thunder"
- Medic Platoon "Blood"

== 2nd Battalion ==
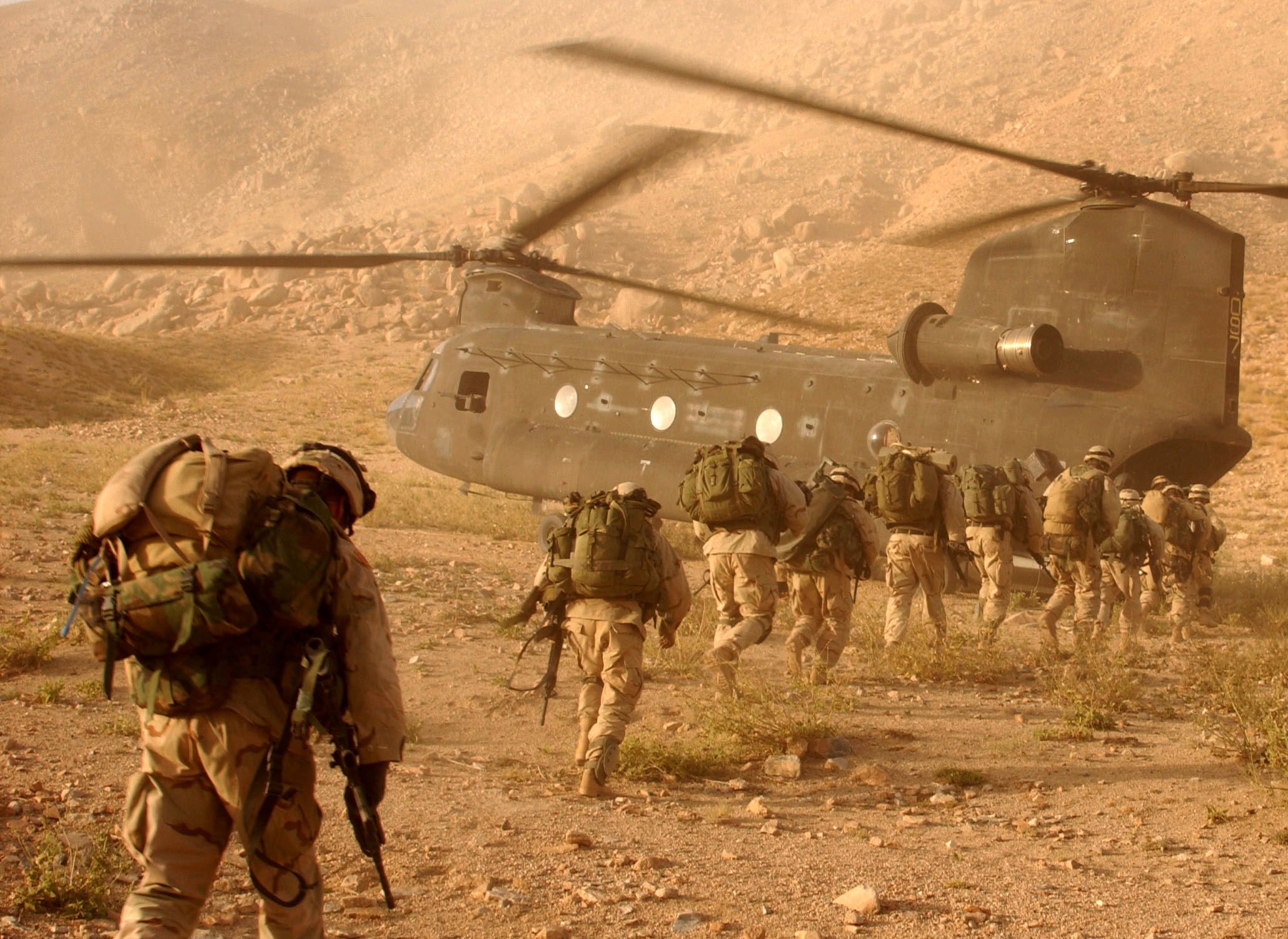
Soldiers quickly march to the ramp of the CH-47 Chinook helicopter that will return them to Kandahar Army Air Field on 4 Sept. 2003. The soldiers were searching in Daychopan district, Afghanistan, for Taliban fighters and illegal weapons caches. The soldiers are assigned to Company A, 2d Battalion, 22d Infantry Regiment, 10th Mountain Division. U.S. Army photo by Staff Sgt. Kyle Davis.

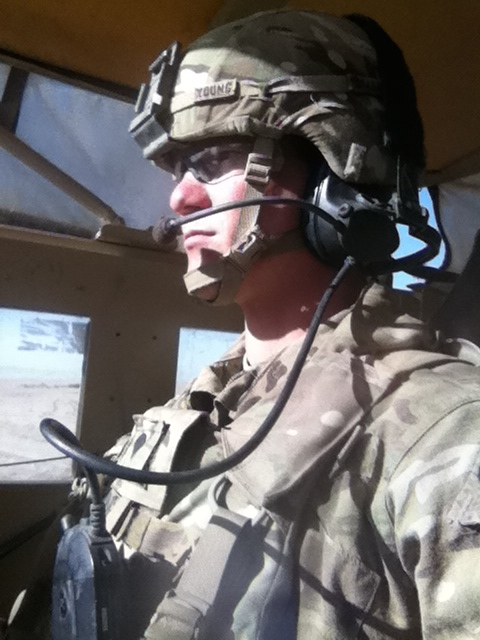
Soldier of 2d Battalion, 22d Infantry Regiment in Afghanistan 2013

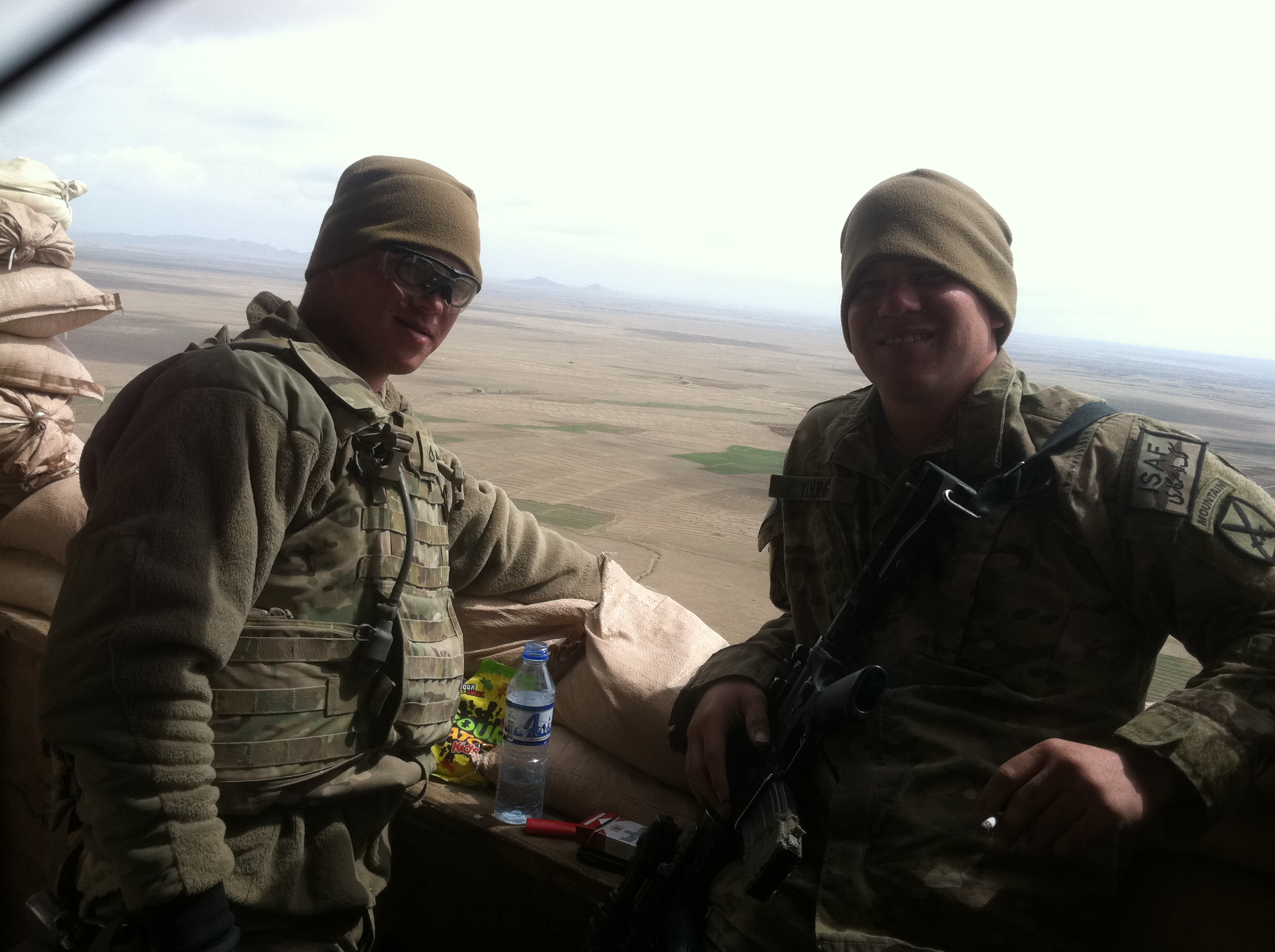
2-22 Infantry soldiers manning an out post in Afghanistan, 2013.

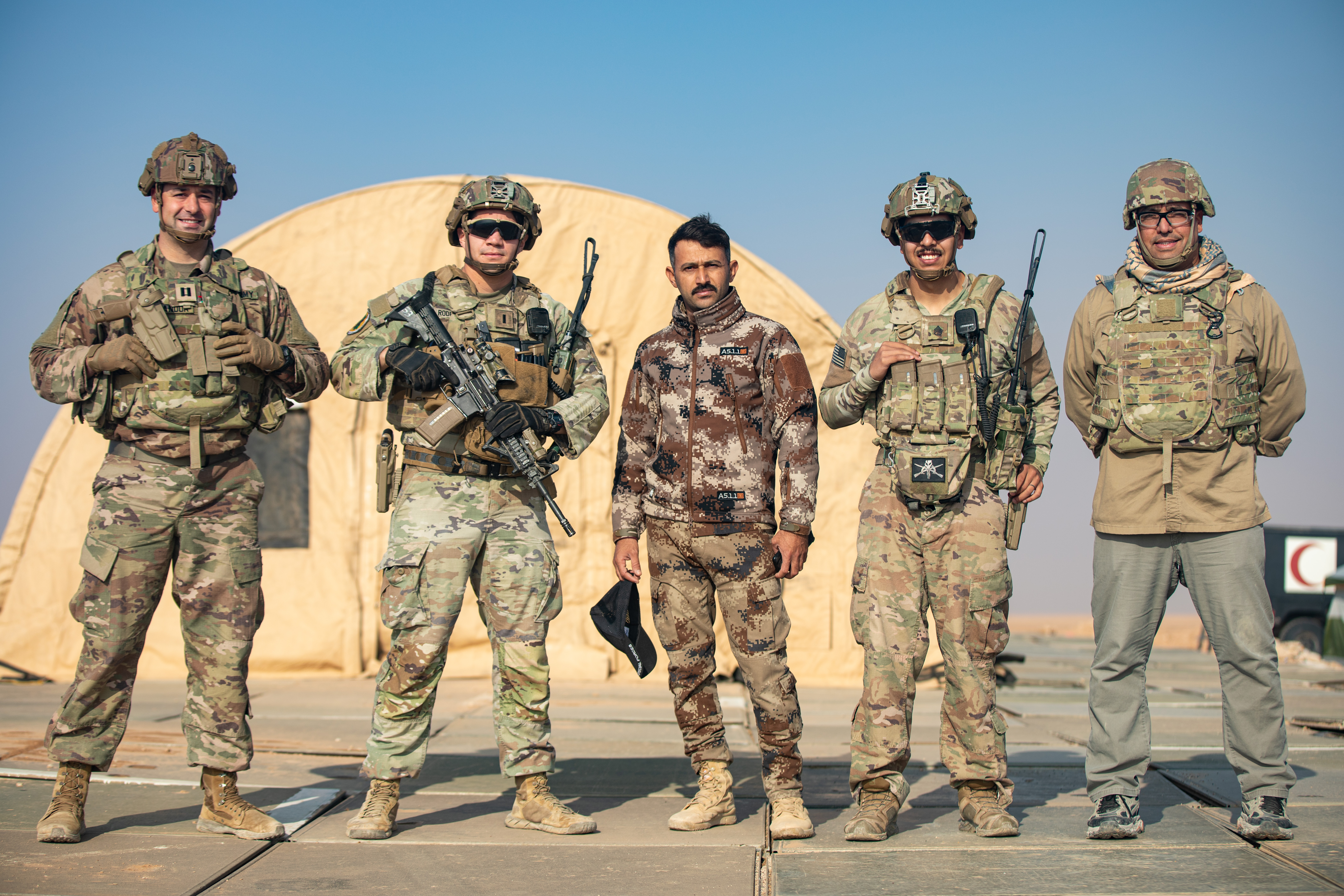
Charlie Company, 2-22 Infantry with Iraqi troops at Al Asad Airbase, 2022

The 2d Battalion, 22d Infantry (Triple Deuce) Regiment was originally constituted on 3 May 1861 in the Regular Army as Companies B and K, 2d Battalion, 13th Infantry. It was organized in May 1865 at Camp Dennison, Ohio. It was reorganized and redesignated on 21 September 1866 as Companies B and K, 22nd Infantry.

Companies B and K, 22d Infantry were consolidated on 4 May 1869. The resulting consolidated unit was designated as Company B, 22d Infantry. It inactivated on 30 June 1927 at Fort McPherson, Georgia. The unit reactivated on 1 June 1940 at Fort McClellan, Alabama, and following the end of World War II, inactivated on 1 March 1946 at Camp Butner, North Carolina.

It activated on 15 July 1947 at Fort Ord, California. It inactivated on again on 1 April 1957 at Fort Lewis, Washington, and was relieved from assignment to the 4th Infantry Division. The unit was concurrently redesignated as Headquarters and Headquarters Company, 2d Battle Group, 22d Infantry.

It was redesignated on 21 August 1963 as Headquarters and Headquarters Company, 2d Battalion (Mechanized), 22nd Infantry and assigned to the 4th Infantry Division, while its organic elements were concurrently constituted. The battalion activated on 1 October 1963 at Fort Lewis, Washington.

It was relieved on 1 August 1967 from assignment to the 4th Infantry Division and assigned to the 25th Infantry Division. It was relieved on 15 December 1970 from its assignment to the 25th Infantry Division and assigned to the 4th Infantry Division, before being inactivated in September 1972 at Fort Carson, Colorado.

The unit reactivated in September 1976 at Fort Carson and was assigned to Wiesbaden, Germany as part of the 4th Infantry Division (Forward). It inactivated in July 1984 in Wiesbaden, Germany and was relieved from assignment to the 4th Infantry Division (Mechanized).

The 2d Battalion activated in September 1986 at Fort Drum, New York, and was assigned to the 10th Mountain Division (Light). As the only active battalion left in the 22nd Infantry Regiment, the regimental colors have been with the 2nd Battalion in Fort Drum, NY since the inactivation of the 1st Battalion in 2014.

The 2d Battalion has seen service in Somalia, Haiti, Bosnia, Afghanistan, and Iraq.

=== Operation Restore Hope ===
On 3 December 1992 the 10th Mountain Division (Light) deployed to Somalia in support Operation Restore Hope. The 2nd Battalion's mission along with some of its sister battalions was to secure major cities and roads to provide safe passage of relief supplies to the Somali population suffering from the effects of the Somali Civil War. The 2nd Battalion also provided infantry soldiers to the UN for a QRF sent in to rescue members of Task Force Ranger who were pinned down during a raid in what is known as today as the Battle of Mogadishu. The last soldiers of the 2nd Battalion, 22nd Infantry returned to the United States in March 1994.

=== Operation Iraqi Freedom ===
2-22 IN deployed in support of Operation Iraqi Freedom 2005–2006 to West Baghdad under the command of LTC Kevin P. Brown. The battalion deployed to Operation Iraqi Freedom again in 2007–2008 to Kirkuk as part of the Surge ordered by President George W. Bush. They were commanded by LTC Dennis Sullivan. During combat operations in Kirkuk province, 2-22IN was supported by brigade elements comprising mainly former 2-22IN soldiers. The "Commanders Emergency Relief Program" (CERP) strategically used money as a means to turn the tide of battle.

=== Operation Enduring Freedom ===
2003-2004 deployment to Afghanistan: Operation mountain resolve. In January 2010, the battalion deployed to Afghanistan. There, they served across the country as advisers and trainers for the Afghan National Army in a wide variety of capacities. The battalion was awarded the Meritorious Unit Citation and the Joint Meritorious Unit Award in recognition for their efforts in improving ANA training and administration. In December 2010, the battalion returned home to Fort Drum, NY. The battalion returned to Afghanistan in late January 2013 taking elements of HHC, Co A, Co B, Co D, and Co E. The battalion served in RC East conducting combat operations throughout Ghazni Province, as well as manning OP Goekie. SSG Michael Ollis of Co B heroically lost his life during the defense of FOB Ghazni, and was awarded the Congressional Medal of Honor, as well as the Polish Gold Medal. The battalion returned to Fort Drum, NY from September through October 2013.

=== Operation Inherent Resolve ===
In September 2015, the 1st Brigade Combat Team, 10th Mountain Division returned to Iraq to relieve the 3rd Brigade Combat Team, 82nd Airborne Division. The 2nd Battalion deployed Co A and Co C with elements from Co D, Co G, and HHC to Baghdad in support of Operation Inherent Resolve. The unit returned home to Fort Drum, NY in June 2016 after handing control over to 2nd Brigade Combat Team, 101st Airborne Division (Air Assault).

=== Operation Freedom's Sentinel ===
In January 2020, the 1st Brigade Combat Team, 10th Mountain Division deployed to Afghanistan to relieve 3rd Brigade Combat Team, 82nd Airborne Division. The 2nd Battalion, commanded by LTC Rex Howry deployed in support of Operation Freedom's Sentinel. They conducted a relief in place of the 2nd Battalion, 505th Infantry Regiment and provided support and additional troops to augment SOJTF-A. A majority of the battalion returned to Fort Drum, NY by December 2020.

=== Companies ===
- HHC "Hostile"
- A Company "Anvil"
- B Company "Bushmaster"
- C Company "Chaos"
- D Company "Destroyer"
- G Company/FSC "Gamblers"

==== Specialty platoons ====
- Scout Platoon "Watchdog"
- Mortar Platoon "WolfPack"
- Medic Platoon "Bloodhound"

== 3rd Battalion ==
The 3rd Battalion, 22nd Infantry Regiment featured prominently in the American counterassault against the Vietcong at the Battle of Suoi Tre. The unit's heroism during the battle was recognized when it was awarded the Presidential Unit Citation on 21 October 1968.

== Honors ==
=== Campaigns ===
Indian Wars

1. Little Big Horn, 1876
2. Pine Ridge, South Dakota, 1869/69
3. Montana 1872

Spanish–American War

1. Santiago

Philippine–American War

1. Manila
2. Malolos
3. San Isidro
4. Mindanao
5. Jolo
6. Luzon 1900

World War II

1. Normandy (with arrowhead)
2. Northern France
3. Rhineland
4. Ardennes-Alsace
5. Central Europe

Vietnam

1. Counteroffensive, Phase II
2. Counteroffensive, Phase III
3. Tet Counteroffensive, 1968
4. Counteroffensive, Phase IV, 1968
5. Counteroffensive, Phase V, 1968
6. Counteroffensive, Phase VI, 1968–69
7. Tet 69/ Counteroffensive 1969
8. Summer-Fall 1969
9. Winter-Spring 1970
10. Sanctuary Counteroffensive 1970
11. Counteroffensive Phase VII, 1970–71
12. Consolidation I
13. Consolidation II

Somalia

1. Somalia 1993 (1st & 2nd Battalion)

Afghanistan

1. Streamer to be determined for service in 2003-04 (2nd Battalion)

Iraq

1. Streamer to be determined for service in 2003-04 (1st Battalion)
2. Streamer to be determined for service in 2005-06 Baghdad Iraq (1st & 2nd Battalion)
3. Streamer to be determined for service in 2007-08 Kirkuk Iraq (2nd Battalion)

=== Decorations ===
1. Presidential Unit Citation (Army), Streamer embroidered HURTGEN FOREST (22d Infantry cited; WD GO 37, 1946)
2. Presidential Unit Citation (Army), Streamer embroidered ST. GILLIS MARIGNY (22d Infantry cited; WD GO 14, 1945)
3. Presidential Unit Citation (Army), Streamer embroidered CARENTAN (3d Battalion, 22d Infantry cited;. WD GO 85,1944)
4. Presidential Unit Citation (Army), Streamer embroidered SUOI-TRE, VIETNAM (2d Battalion and 3d Battalion (less Company C), 22d Infantry cited; DA GO 59,1968) * FSB – Gold, 21 March 1967
5. Valorous Unit Award, Streamer embroidered TAY NINH PROVINCE (3d Battalion, 22d Infantry cited; DA GO 42, 1969)
6. Valorous Unit Award, Streamer embroidered KONTUM (lst Battalion, 22d Infantry cited; DA GO 43,1970)
7. Valorous Unit Award, Streamer embroidered IRAQ (lst Battalion, 22d Infantry cited; DA GO 17 May 2005)
8. Valorous Unit Award, Streamer embroidered IRAQ (lst Battalion, 22d Infantry cited; DA GO 19 August 2009)
9. Belgian Fourragere 1940 (22nd Infantry cited; DA GO 43, 1950) Cited in the Order of the Day of the Belgian Army for action in BELGIUM (22d Infantry cited; DA GO 43, 1950)
10. Cited in the Order of the Day of the Belgian Army for action in the ARDENNES (22d Infantry cited; DA GO 43, 1950)

== Crest ==
The regimental crest is symbolic in nature.

- The white represents the color of the old infantry, the past.
- The blue represents the color of the new infantry, the present.
- The embattled partition line, across the center, is for the five wars in which the regiment has taken part.
- The crossed arrows represent the five Indian Wars campaigns the regiment participated in.
- The "Sun in splendor" is the Old Katipunan Device from the Philippine–American War.
- The shape of the crest is for the War with Spain, being the badge of the V Corps, to commemorate the 22d Regiment being the first unit to land on Cuban soil in that war.

== Regimental motto ==
"Deeds not words"

- The motto mirrors the Regimental history of doing what is right and getting the job done, regardless of the price. The Regiment has always been steadfast, loyal, and dependable. The official motto was approved in 1923, along with the Regimental Distinctive Unit Insignia.

== "Regulars by God" ==
- This slogan is used to describe the unit's aggressiveness and discipline displayed while fighting the battle-hardened regulars of the British Army. Their uniforms made the British believe they were militiamen, but their skills in battle proved otherwise. The slogan was coined by British General Sir Phineas Riall when asked by his adjutant if these soldiers were indeed militia during the Battle of Chippawa. The battle signaled the point when the Regular Army gained the respect of its adversaries and renewed the American soldier's faith in himself.

== Notable members ==
- Seven soldiers received the Medal of Honor while serving in the 22d Infantry Regiment, including James Kephart during the Civil War, Bernard McCann and Julius Schou during the Indian Wars, Charles H. Pierce and Charles W. Ray during the Philippine–American War, Macario Garcia during World War II, and John E. Warren, Jr. during the Vietnam War.
- Simon Bolivar Buckner, Jr. (18 July 1886 – 18 June 1945) was an American Lieutenant General during World War II. He commanded the 22d Infantry Regiment in 1938. He was killed during the closing days of the Battle of Okinawa by enemy artillery fire, making him the highest-ranking U.S. military officer to have been killed by enemy fire during World War II.
- Ernest Hemingway was with the 22d Infantry Regiment during World War II when the unit saw action from Paris through Belgium and into Germany.
- Preston Niland, one of the Niland brothers who inspired the film Saving Private Ryan.
- Steven Dane Russell, LTC, USA (Ret.), a former member of the United States House of Representatives in Oklahoma's 5th congressional district. He is a former member of the Oklahoma Senate. Russell commanded the 1st Battalion in combat in Tikrit, Iraq, from the spring of 2003 to the spring of 2004. His task force was a part of The 1st Brigade, 4th Infantry Division.
- James L. Terry was commander of the 2d Battalion, 22d Infantry from June 1994 to June 1996.
- Joseph Votel is a retired four-star general who served as commander of United States Central Command. Joseph Votel served as a Battalion Commander of 2d Battalion, 22nd Infantry at Fort Drum, NY.

== In media ==
The unit depicted in the 1986 movie Platoon was the 3d Battalion, 22d Infantry. In the scene where Oliver Stone makes a cameo appearance as the Battalion Commander, there is a small sign displaying: 3-22 CP (Command Post).

In the television show Jericho, in the last episodes of season one and through season two, 2d Battalion 22d Infantry (Triple Deuce) occupies the titular town and plays a key part in the story. Signage on the door to the local bar clearly identifies the unit.

The 1st Battalion was broadly covered during the first year of the Iraq war (2003–04) by CNN, Fox News Channel, ABC, NBC News, CBS News, Time, Associated Press and Reuters. This unit was a central player in the hunt and capture of Saddam Hussein and has been featured in the Discovery Channel's Ace in the Hole and BBC Panorama's "Saddam on the Run" documentaries.
