= Across the River and into the Trees =

1950 novel by Ernest Hemingway

- First American edition
- Author: Ernest Hemingway
- Cover artist: Adriana Ivancich
- Language: English
- Genre: Novel
- Publisher: Charles Scribner's Sons
- Publication date: 1950
- Publication place: United States
- Media type: Print (Hardcover)
- Pages: 320

Across the River and into the Trees is a novel by American writer Ernest Hemingway, published by Charles Scribner's Sons in 1950, after first being serialized in Cosmopolitan magazine earlier that year. The title is derived from the last words of Confederate States Army General Thomas J. "Stonewall" Jackson, who was mortally wounded by friendly fire during the American Civil War: “Let us cross over the river and rest under the shade of the trees.” In the 19th century, this was understood to refer to the Jordan River and the passage to death and afterlife in Christianity.

Hemingway's novel opens with Colonel Richard Cantwell, a 50-year-old US Army officer, duck hunting near Venice, Italy at the close of World War II. It is revealed that Cantwell has a terminal heart condition. Most of the novel takes the form of a lengthy flashback, detailing his experiences in the Italian Front during World War I through the days leading up to the duck hunt. The bulk of the narrative deals with his star-crossed romance with a Venetian woman named Renata, who is more than thirty years his junior.

During a trip to Italy not long before writing the novel, Hemingway met young Adriana Ivancich, with whom he became infatuated. He used her as the model for the female character in the novel. The novel's central theme is death and, more importantly, how death is faced. One biographer and critic sees a parallel between Hemingway's Across the River and into the Trees and Thomas Mann's Death in Venice.

Hemingway described Across the River and into the Trees, and one reader's reaction to it, by using "Indian talk": "Book too much for him. Book start slow, then increase in pace till it becomes impossible to stand. I bring emotion up to where you can’t stand it, then we level off, so we won’t have to provide oxygen tents for the readers. Book is like engine. We have to slack her off gradually."

Written in Italy, Cuba, and France in the late 1940s, this novel was the first of his to receive negative press and reviews. It was nonetheless a bestseller in America, spending 7 weeks at the top of The New York Times bestseller's list in 1950. It was Hemingway's only novel to top the list.

Critics were unenthusiastic. J. Donald Adams writing in The New York Times, described it as “one of the saddest books I have ever read; not because I am moved to compassion by the conjunction of love and death in the Colonel's life, but because a great talent has come, whether for now or forever, to such a dead end”. Only a few contemporary critics praised the novel.

== Plot summary ==
The first chapter of Across the River and into the Trees begins with a frame story depicting 50-year-old Colonel Richard Cantwell duck hunting in the Marano Lagoon, between Venice and Trieste in the present, taking place during the closing days of World War II. It is eventually revealed that Cantwell, referred to throughout the book simply as Colonel, has a terminal heart condition. Beginning in the second chapter, the book is presented primarily through a flashback narrative of the Colonel's service in the Italian Royal Army during World War I, to his time in the United States Army during World War II, ascending to general before being demoted to colonel. Hemingway provides great detail in describing Italy, from its landscape to its food and drink.

The primary narrative of the book focuses on the Colonel's romance with the 18-year-old Venetian Countess Renata, whom he calls Daughter. Renata is aware of the Colonel's terminal illness, and the book details how both characters come to terms with the Colonel's impending death. Many of the Colonel's wartime memories are revealed as stories he tells to Renata, who wants to "share" in his experiences.

The novel ends with Cantwell suffering a fatal series of heart attacks as he leaves Venice after the duck hunt, on the same day as the book began. Shortly before dying, the Colonel recounts to his driver Stonewall Jackson's last words, from which the novel draws its name: "No, no, let us cross over the river and rest under the shade of the trees." The final scene shows the driver reading a note the Colonel had given him, indicating that his belongings should be given to their "rightful owner", Renata.

== Background and publication ==
Ernest Hemingway first met A. E. Hotchner, who later became a close friend, in 1948 when Hotchner, recently discharged from the Air Force, had taken a job with Cosmopolitan Magazine as a "commissioned agent." Hemingway's name was on the list of authors Hotchner was to contact, so he went to Cuba, asked for a meeting (Hemingway took him to a bar), and for a short article. Hemingway did not write an article, but he did submit his next novel Across the River and into the Trees to Hotchner, which Cosmopolitan then serialized in five installments. The protagonist is generally considered to have been based loosely on a friend of Hemingway, Charles T. Lanham, with components of the character also being autobiographically based on the author himself.

Hemingway worked on the book from 1949 to 1950 in four different places: he started writing during the winter of 1949 in Italy at Cortina D'Ampezzo; continued upon his return home to Cuba; finished the draft in Paris; and completed revisions in Venice in the winter of 1950.

In the fall of 1948, he arrived in Italy and visited Fossalta where in 1918 he had been wounded. A month later, while duck hunting with an Italian aristocrat he met 18-year-old Adriana Ivancich. He and his then-wife Mary then went to Cortina to ski: she broke her ankle and, bored, Hemingway began the draft of the book. Hemingway himself then became ill with an eye infection and was hospitalized. In the spring he went to Venice where he ate lunch with Adriana a few times. In May he returned to Cuba and carried out a protracted correspondence with her while working on the manuscript. In the autumn he returned to Europe and he finished the draft at the Ritz in Paris. Once done, he and Mary went again to Cortina to ski: for the second time she broke her ankle and he contracted an eye infection. By February the first serialization was published in Cosmopolitan. The Hemingways returned to Paris in March and then home to Cuba where the final proofs were read before the September publication.

Cosmopolitan Magazine serialized Across the River and into the Trees from February to June 1950. Adriana Ivancich designed the dust jacket of the first edition, although her original artwork was redrawn by the Scribner's promotions department. The novel was published by Scribner's on 7 September 1950 with a first edition print run of 75,000, after a publicity campaign that hailed the novel as Hemingway's first book since the publication of his 1940 Spanish Civil War novel For Whom the Bell Tolls.

== Writing style and genre ==
Hemingway started as a journalist and writer of short stories, and Baker suggests that he thus learned how to "get the most from the least, how to prune language, how to multiply intensities, and how to tell nothing but the truth in a way that allowed for telling more than the truth". The style is known as the Iceberg Theory because in Hemingway's writing the hard facts float above water; the supporting structure, complete with symbolism, operates out-of-sight. The concept of the iceberg theory is sometimes referred to as the "theory of omission." Hemingway believed that a writer could describe one thing, while an entirely different thing occurs below the surface. Baker calls Across the River and into the Trees a "lyric-poetical novel" in which each scene has an underlying truth presented via symbolism. According to Meyers, an example of omission is that Renata, like other heroines in Hemingway's fiction, suffers a major "shock"—the murder of her father and the subsequent loss of her home—to which Hemingway alludes only briefly. Hemingway's pared-down narrative forces the reader to solve connections—as Stoltzfus has written: "Hemingway walks the reader to the bridge that he or she must cross alone without the narrator's help."

Across the River and into the Trees is constructed so that time is seemingly compressed and differentiated between present and past – as one critic says, "memory and space-time coalesce." To move Cantwell into the extended flashback, Hemingway uses the word "boy" as a bridge between time-present and time-past. The dialogue stays in the present tense, despite the time shifts, according to Stoltzfus, and the word "now" is repeated to "reinforce the illusion".

== Themes ==
Cantwell, a 50-year-old military officer in love with the teenaged Renata, (whose name means "reborn"), is shown unlikeable as a character; one critic writes of him that his "lovemaking is described in terms of an infantry attack over difficult terrain". He is dying of heart disease and his relationship with Renata can be interpreted as a means of seeking youth or immortality. Hemingway biographer Jeffrey Meyers believes Renata represents the city of Venice, she "connected" Cantwell (and Hemingway) to Italy, and in her characterization Hemingway romanticized what may have been a father–daughter relationship and he says Hemingway probably used Cantwell's fictional relationship with Renata as a substitute for his own relationship with Adriana, who looked almost identical to Renata's description.

Hemingway biographer Carlos Baker says Hemingway captured the theme of "the three ages of man," and in writing the book he finally objectified his own youthful traumatic war experiences. Baker sees a thematic parallel between Thomas Mann's Death in Venice and Across the River and into the Trees, presented in a series of commonalities and differences. Death in Venice is set in the summer on Venice's Lido; Hemingway puts Cantwell in Venice in the winter. Mann's protagonist is a writer; Hemingway's a soldier. Both faced death, and in the face of death sought solace in a much younger character. Cantwell reminisces about the past while Renata (an 18-year-old countess with whom Cantwell spends the last days of his life) lives in the present. Cantwell says that "Every day is a new and fine illusion" where a kernel of truth can be found. Cantwell is a character in opposition: a tough soldier yet a tender friend and lover. The two Cantwells at times overlap and bleed into one another. Hemingway added yet another layer in the characterization: 50-year-old Cantwell in his dying day is "in an intense state of awareness" of his younger self of 1918 to the point that meld – yet retain the differences wrought by time.

Charles Oliver writes the novel shows a central Hemingway theme of "maintaining control over one's life, even in the face of terrible odds." Cantwell knows he is dying and faces death "with the dignity which he believes he has maintained throughout his military service." Oliver thinks the two male characters, Cantwell and Alvarito, have an unstated understanding – both men love Renata, but Cantwell accepts and is happy to know Renata will almost certainly marry Alvarito. Within hours of dying, he says to himself: "You have said goodbye to your girl and she has said goodbye to you. That is certainly simple". The theme of death is central in Hemingway's writings and his characters routinely achieve redemption at the moment of death, which can be seen as a form of existentialism. Jean-Paul Sartre believed to face death well is to live a heightened existence.

Jackson Benson writes that how a writer transforms biographical events into art is more important than looking for connections between Hemingway's life and his fiction. He believes autobiographical events may have a "very tenuous relationship" with the fiction similar to a dream from which a drama emerges. Hemingway's later fiction, Benson writes "is like an adolescent day-dream in which he acts out infatuation and consummation, as in Across the River." Meyers agrees that parallels exist between Hemingway and Colonel Cantwell, but he sees more similarities with Hemingway's friend of many decades "Chink" Dorman-Smith, whose military career was undermined causing his demotion. Benson believes Hemingway used autobiographical details to work as framing devices to write about life in general—not only about his life. For example, Benson postulates that Hemingway used his experiences and drew them out further with "what if" scenarios: "what if I were wounded in such a way that I could not sleep at night? What if I were wounded and made crazy, what would happen if I were sent back to the front?" For example, he describes Hemingway's experiences in the World War II battle of the Battle of Hürtgen Forest succinctly as "Passchendaele with tree bursts."

Hemingway himself stated that Cantwell was based on three men: close friend and mercenary Charles Sweeny, American officer "Buck" Lanham, and most importantly, himself.

== Reception ==
John O'Hara wrote in The New York Times; "The most important author living today, the outstanding author since the death of Shakespeare, has brought out a new novel. The title of the novel is Across the River and into the Trees. The author, of course, is Ernest Hemingway, the most important, the outstanding author out of the millions of writers who have lived since 1616." Tennessee Williams, in The New York Times, wrote: "I could not go to Venice, now, without hearing the haunted cadences of Hemingway's new novel. It is the saddest novel in the world about the saddest city, and when I say I think it is the best and most honest work that Hemingway has done, you may think me crazy. It will probably be a popular book. The critics may treat it pretty roughly. But its hauntingly tired cadences are the direct speech of a man's heart who is speaking that directly for the first time, and that makes it, for me, the finest thing Hemingway has done."

Williams and O'Hara were among the very few positive contemporary reviews, while negative reviews appeared in more than 150 publications. Critics claimed the novel was too emotional, had inferior prose and a "static plot", and that Cantwell was an "avatar" for Hemingway's character Nick Adams. The novel was also criticized for being an unsuitable autobiography, and for presenting Cantwell as a bitter soldier.

Sure they can say anything about nothing happening in Across the River, all that happens is the defense of the lower Piave, the breakthrough in Normandy, the taking of Paris ... plus a man who loves a girl and dies.

— Ernest Hemingway about critical reception to
Across the River and into the Trees.

According to Hemingway biographer Carlos Baker, Hemingway was "deeply wounded by the negative reviews" of this novel. Furthermore, Baker explains Hemingway was unaware that those close to him agreed with the majority of critics. For example, his wife Mary, who disapproved of Across the River and into the Trees, said: "I kept my mouth shut. Nobody had appointed me my husband's editor."

Later literary scholars consider the novel better than the contemporary reception. Baker compares it to Shakespeare's Winter's Tale, or The Tempest: not a major work, but one with an "elegiac" tone. Literary biographer Jeffrey Meyers believes the novel shows a new "confessional mode" in Hemingway's work, and that it "would have been hailed as more impressive if it had been written by anyone but Hemingway." Critic Ben Stoltzfus agrees, and he believes Hemingway's structure is more comprehensible for the modern reader—exposed to the Nouveau roman—than for those of the mid-20th century.

== Film adaptation ==
In 2016, it was announced that a feature film based upon the novel was being developed with producers Kirstin Roegner and John Smallcombe. Filming started in Venice, Italy on December 9, 2020, with Liev Schreiber in the lead role and Paula Ortiz directing. The film debuted at the Sun Valley Film Festival on March 30, 2022.
