= Charles T. Lanham =

United States Army general

Charles Trueman Lanham
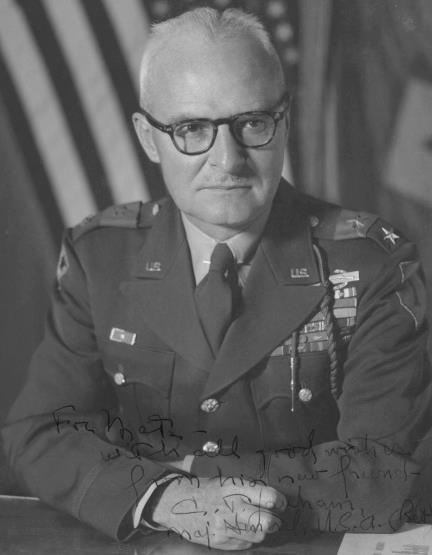
- Major General Charles T. Lanham in the early 1950s
- Born: September 14, 1902; Washington, D. C., United States
- Died: July 20, 1978 (aged 75); Chevy Chase, Maryland, United States
- Burial place: Arlington National Cemetery
- Military career
- Branch: United States Army
- Service years: 1924–1954
- Rank: Major General
- Nickname: "Buck"
- Unit: Infantry Branch
- Commands: 272nd Infantry Regiment; 22nd Infantry Regiment; 1st Infantry Division
- Conflicts: World War II: Operation Overlord; Battle of Hurtgen Forest; Battle of the Bulge
- Awards: Distinguished Service Cross; Army Distinguished Service Medal

Major General Charles Trueman Lanham (September 14, 1902 – July 20, 1978), known as "Buck", was an author, poet, and professional soldier in the United States Army, winning 14 decorations in his career. After retiring from the military, he was active in corporate business. He is the model for one of Ernest Hemingway's heroes, and in life was a close friend of the author.

== Military life ==
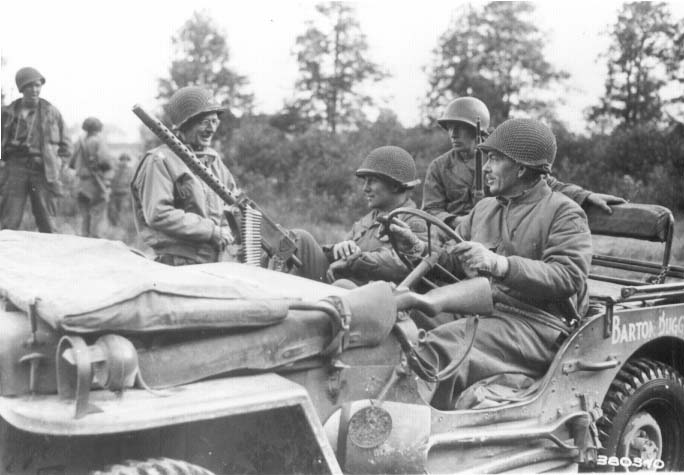
Major General Raymond O. Barton (right) and Colonel Buck T. Lanham (left) after the latter's 22nd Infantry was first to break through the Siegfried Line on September 14, 1944

Lanham was born in Washington D. C. He attended Eastern High School and graduated from West Point in 1924. He was a short story writer and published poet (writing sonnets for several magazines) as well as a soldier. He included among his many military adventures the command of the 22nd Infantry Regiment in Normandy in July 1944, and was the first American officer to lead a break through the Siegfried Line on September 14, 1944, near Buchet. These developments were described by Hemingway in his article "War in the Siegfried Line". He led a breakout in the Battle of the Bulge after surviving a bloody ordeal in the Battle of Hurtgen Forest. Lanham earned the Distinguished Service Cross for his actions in the Huertgen Forest. The citation for the medal reads:

The President of the United States of America, authorized by Act of Congress July 9, 1918, takes pleasure in presenting the Distinguished Service Cross to Colonel (Infantry) Charles Trueman Lanham (ASN: 0-15568), United States Army, for extraordinary heroism in connection with military operations against an armed enemy while Commanding the 22d Infantry Regiment, 4th Infantry Division, in action against enemy forces on 14 September 1944, in Germany. As the assault elements of his command charged strong enemy fortified positions, Colonel Lanham, observing the action from a forward position, saw the attack falter and halt under a fierce artillery barrage. Passing through the withering fire, he advanced courageously to the battered troops to assume personal command. Moving out in front of his men, Colonel Lanham proceeded forward fearlessly in the face of heavy enemy fire. Inspired by this display of valor, the men vigorously stormed the enemy position. Colonel Lanham's inspiring leadership, personal bravery and zealous devotion to duty exemplify the highest traditions of the military forces of the United States and reflect great credit upon himself, the 4th Infantry Division, and the United States Army.

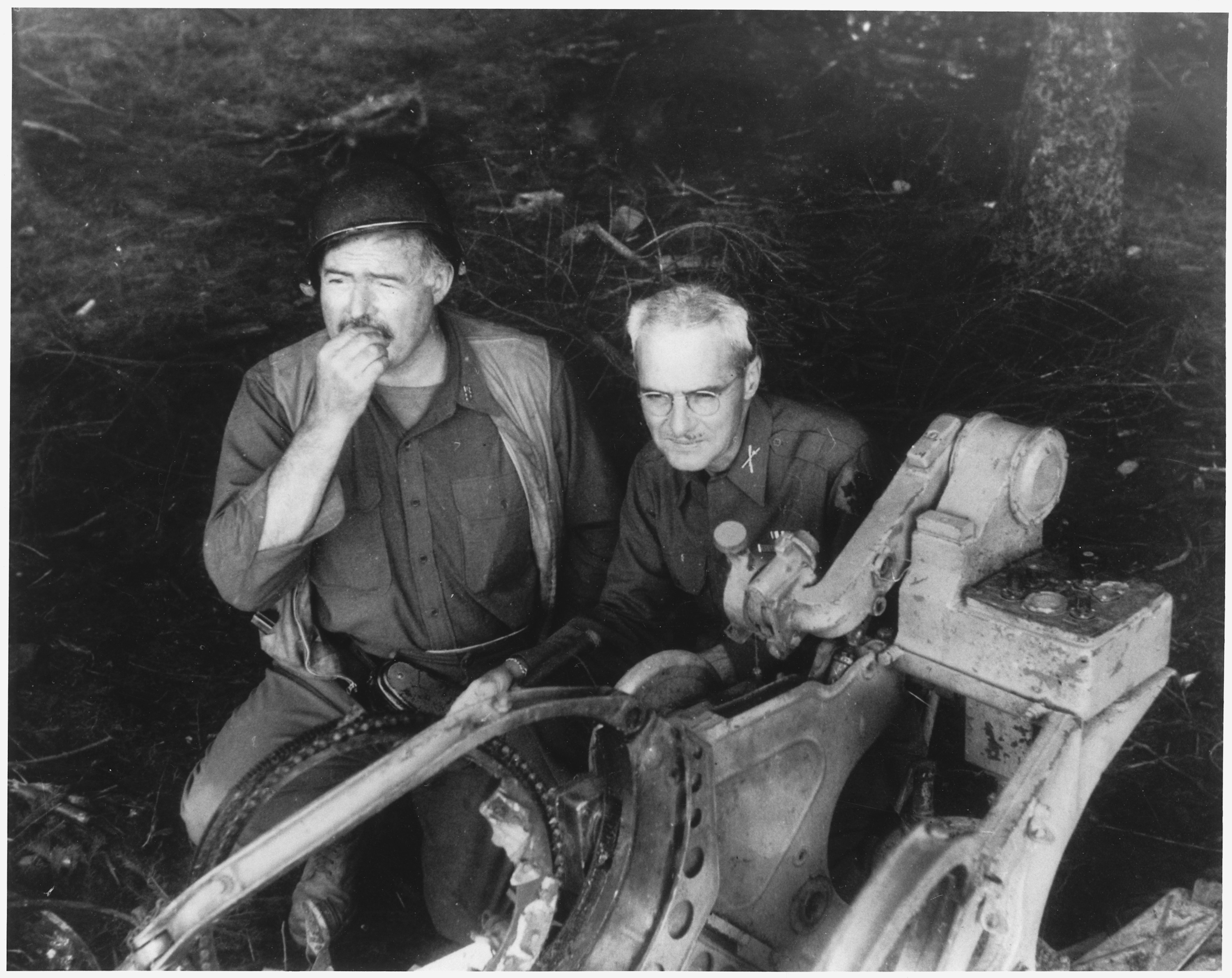
Colonel Buck T. Lanham (right) with Ernest Hemingway (left) and a 2 cm Flak 38 after breakthrough of the Siegfried Line in Western Germany, September 18, 1944

It was in the Normandy battles that Lanham and Ernest Hemingway first met, and Hemingway later went with Lanham to Huertgen. Hemingway was writing battlefield stories for the American audience for Collier's and sought assignment with Lanham's regiment. Hemingway described Lanham as "The finest and bravest and most intelligent military commander I have known."

Conversely, one of his least-admired decisions came with the awarding of the Combat Infantryman Badge to his men. Many men in the 22nd Infantry had landed on Omaha Beach on D-Day, but Lanham rejected this date and made awards of the badge effective no earlier than August 10, 1944, which deprived the men of an additional $10 per month for the full period in which they fought. His reason "What ever happened in this regiment before I took command does not concern me."

While serving as Assistant Division Commander, 104th Infantry Division, Lanham was decorated with the Order of the Patriotic War First Class when the division linked up with Soviet Red Army units in May 1945.

== Post-military life ==
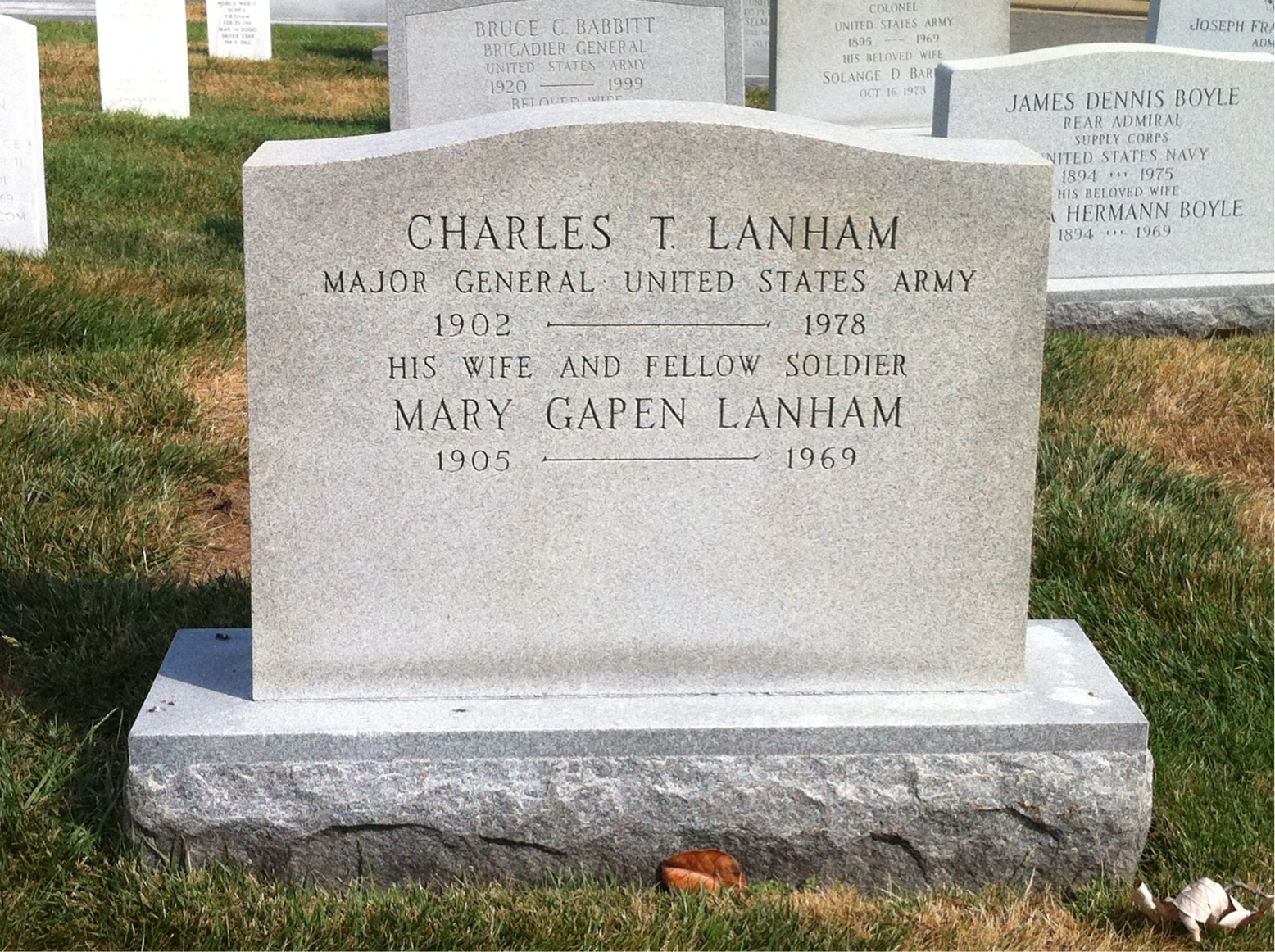
The grave of Major General Charles T. Lanham at Arlington National Cemetery

Lanham retired from the military at the end of 1954 as a major general, and joined the Pennsylvania-Texas Corporation of Colt's Patent Firearms. He resigned in 1958 and joined Xerox in 1960 as vice president for Government Relations, retiring from that post at the end of 1970. He died on July 20, 1978, in Chevy Chase, Maryland, from cancer at the age of 76. He is buried in Arlington National Cemetery.

== In fiction ==
Colonel "Buck" Lanham was one of the models for the character Colonel Cantwell in Hemingway's novel Across the River and into the Trees, along with Charles Sweeny and Hemingway himself.

Military offices
| Preceded by Thomas S. Timberman | Commanding General 1st Infantry Division; 1953–1954 | Succeeded by Guy S. Meloy Jr. |
