= James Kephart =

James Kephart (April 22, 1842 – April 27, 1932) was an American recipient of the Medal of Honor who earned the medal in action during the American Civil War.

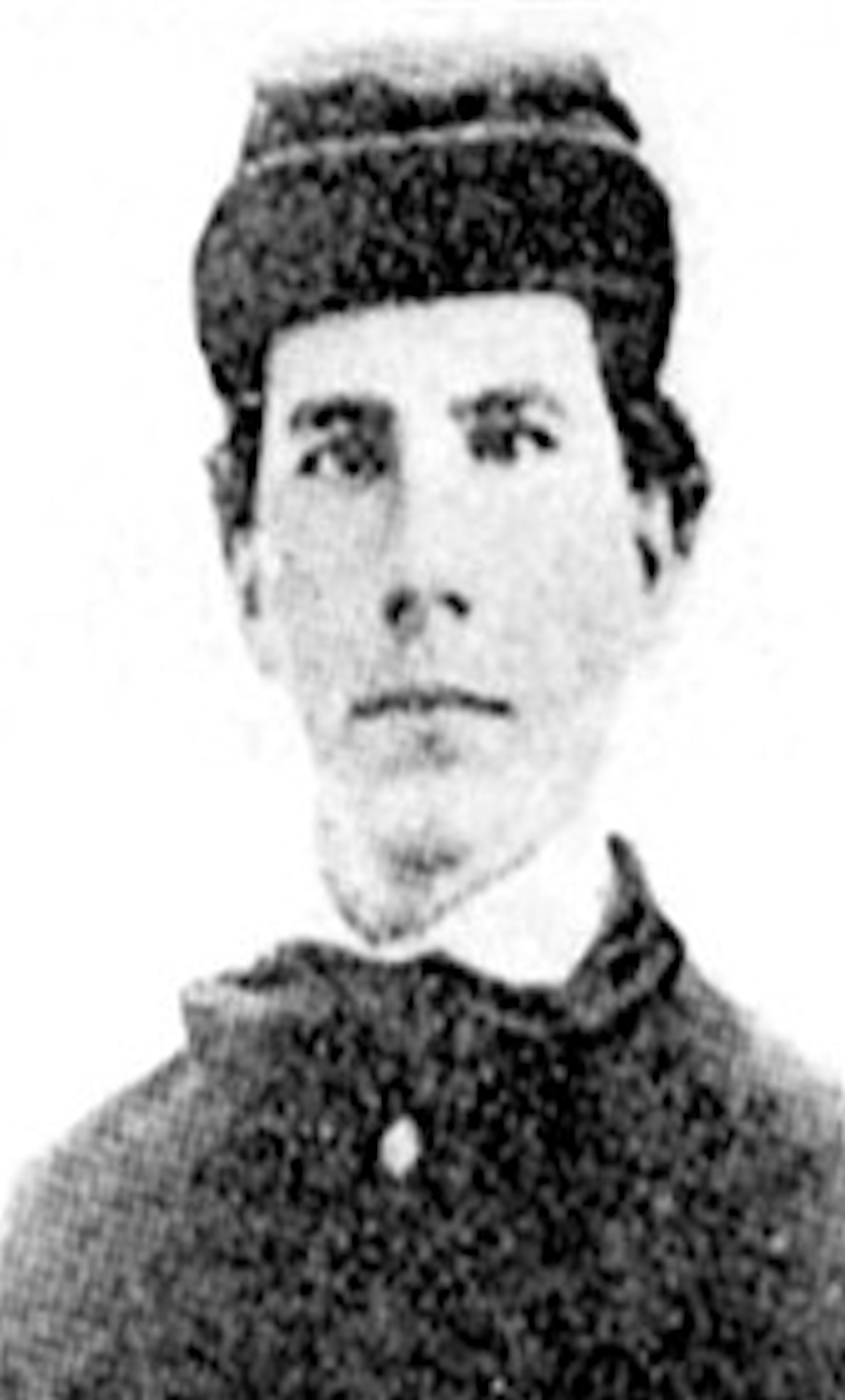
James Kephart circa 1865.

== Biography ==
Kephart was born in Venango County, Pennsylvania on April 22, 1842. He served as a private in Company C of the 13th U.S. Infantry of the Union Army during the American Civil War. He earned his medal in action at the Battle of Vicksburg, Mississippi on May 19, 1863. Kephart's medal was issued on May 13, 1899. Kephart lived in Webster City, Iowa after the war where he served on the City Board of Education. He died in Gooding, Idaho on April 27, 1932, and is now buried there in Elmwood Cemetery.

== Medal of Honor Citation ==
For extraordinary heroism on 19 May 1863, in action at Vicksburg, Mississippi. Private Kephart voluntarily and at the risk of his life, under a severe fire of the enemy, aided and assisted to the rear an officer who had been severely wounded and left on the field.
