= Hemingway (surname) =

Hemingway is a surname. Notable people with the name include:

- Anthony Hemingway, American film and television director
- Byron Hemingway (born 1954), American football player
- Cyril Hemingway (1903–1978), English footballer
- Dave Hemingway (born 1960), British musician
- Dree Hemingway (born 1987), American model and actress
- Ed Hemingway (1893–1969), American baseball player
- Ernest Hemingway (1899–1961), American author and journalist
- Frank Hemingway, rugby league footballer of the 1930s, 1940s and 1950s
- George Hemingway (1872–1907), English cricketer
- Gerry Hemingway (born 1955), American jazz composer and percussionist
- Gloria Hemingway (1931–2001), American doctor, third and youngest child of Ernest Hemingway
- Hilary Hemingway, American author, niece of Ernest Hemingway
- Jack Hemingway (1923–2000), first son of Ernest Hemingway
- John Hemingway (born 1960), American author, grandson of Ernest Hemingway
- John Hemingway (RAF officer) (1919–2025), Irish RAF fighter pilot
- Junior Hemingway (born 1988), American football player
- Leicester Hemingway (1915–1982), American writer, brother of Ernest Hemingway
- Lorian Hemingway (born 1951), American writer, granddaughter of Ernest Hemingway
- Lynn Hemingway (born 1945), Utah State representative
- Maggie Hemingway (1946–1993), British novelist
- Margaux Hemingway (1955–1996), American actress, granddaughter of Ernest Hemingway
- Mariel Hemingway (born 1961), American actress, granddaughter of Ernest Hemingway
- Mary Welsh Hemingway (1908–1986), American journalist, fourth wife of Ernest Hemingway
- Matt Hemingway (born 1972), 2004 Olympic Silver Medalist in the High Jump
- Mollie Hemingway (born 1974), American author, columnist, and political commentator
- Patrick Hemingway (1928–2025), second son of Ernest Hemingway
- Peter Hemingway (1929–1995), English architect
- Rose Hemingway (born 1984), American actress, performer and singer
- Thomas Hemingway, American Brigadier General, military lawyer
- Toby Hemingway (born 1983), British actor
- Tom Hemingway (born 1986), English rugby player
- Tonka Hemingway (born 2001), American football player
- Wayne Hemingway (born 1961), English fashion designer
- William Hemingway (1873–1967), English cricketer
