= John Hemingway (disambiguation) =

John Hemingway (born 1960) is a Canadian-American author.

John Hemingway may also refer to:

- Jack Hemingway (1923–2000), Canadian-American writer, son of Ernest Hemingway, half-nephew of the above
- John Hemingway (RAF officer) (1919–2025), Irish RAF pilot, last surviving airman of the Battle of Britain
- John Heminway (born 1944), American filmmaker and author

== See also ==
- John Hemenway Duncan (1854–1929), American architect
