= Running from Crazy =

- Directed by: Barbara Kopple
- Produced by: Barbara Kopple; David Cassidy
- Starring: Mariel Hemingway; Margaux Hemingway; Jack Hemingway; Langley Crisman; Dree Crisman; Joan Hemingway; Bobby Williams
- Cinematography: Andrew Young
- Edited by: Michael Culbya; Mona Davis
- Production company: Cabin Creek Films
- Release dates: January 7, 2013 (Sundance Film Festival); November 1, 2013 (United States)
- Running time: 105 minutes
- Country: United States
- Language: English
- Box office: $33,300 (domestic)

Running from Crazy is a 2013 television documentary film directed by Barbara Kopple about the family of Mariel Hemingway, granddaughter of Nobel Prize-winning author Ernest Hemingway. Through the eyes of Mariel, who received an Oscar nomination for her role in Woody Allen's 1979 film Manhattan, and who has spoken for the American Foundation for Suicide Prevention, it chronicles the story of three of the author's grandchildren: Mariel, Margaux Hemingway and Joan "Muffet" Hemingway, daughters of Jack Hemingway, and their struggles with the family history of substance abuse, mental illness and suicide. It was produced by Cabin Creek Films for the Oprah Winfrey Network, with both Barbara Kopple and Oprah Winfrey as executive producers. First shown at the 2013 Sundance Film Festival, it premiered on OWN on April 27, 2014.

== Synopsis ==
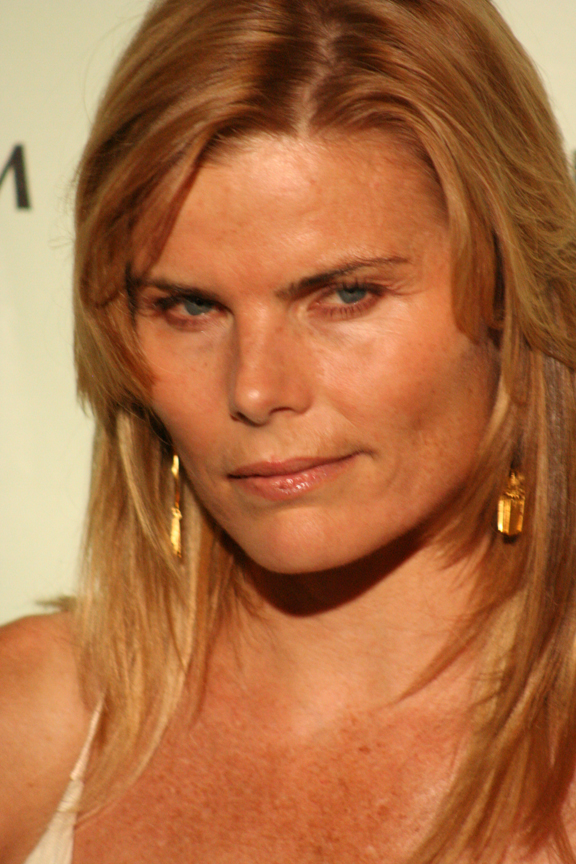
The documentary is told through the eyes of Mariel Hemingway, author Ernest Hemingway's granddaughter.

Mariel comments early in the film on the fact that seven family members have committed suicide, including Ernest and Margaux. Ernest shot himself a few months before his granddaughter Mariel was born.

The film includes excerpts from lengthy footage filmed by Margaux in 1983, called by a reviewer the "most riveting depictions of the Hemingway clan". It demonstrates the contrast between the two sisters: Margaux's modeling and acting career ultimately collapsed, and in 1996 she died of a drug overdose just days before the 35th anniversary of her grandfather's suicide, while Mariel's early career was successful. In the documentary, Mariel describes her own experience with depression and thoughts of suicide, which she says she has overcome, and talks of her difficulties in dealing with sometimes abusive family members, (Note: She states in the documentary: "When I was really small, and I shared a room with Margaux, and my dad came in the room, you know... I don't wanna call it what it was, but it wasn't right, you know... um, it's hard to have a visual of that, you don't wanna see your dad doing those things, but I know it, I know it happened. I think that my dad abused the girls [Margaux and Joan], sexually abused the girls, um, when they were young. My dad, if you met him, was not, you don't think 'oh, pedophile', or this or that, you just didn't, that's not what came to your mind at all, at all, he was a beautiful man and in many ways, but I think it happened in drunk, you know, behavior, you know 'my wife doesn't love me', I don't know what the reasons were. You know 'I'm obsessed with my daughters', I don't know why a person can even go there.... I know people would say, 'there's no way in hell your father did that'. And yet, Margaux was obsessed with him, Muffet was obsessed with him, and my mother allowed me to sleep with her my whole childhood practically. I slept with my mom from age seven to age sixteen. But I witnessed it as a kid, so... that's why I thought it never happened to me, because... I don't know why it didn't, but I just assumed it happened to them and it didn't happen to me.") and with the mental illness of her sister Muffet, diagnosed with "bipolar schizophrenia".

== Reception ==
A reviewer called the film "one of the bleakest snapshots of the human soul at this year's [Sundance] festival".
