= Mowrer =

Mowrer is the surname of the following people:

- Edgar Ansel Mowrer (1892–1977), American journalist and author
- Gordon Mowrer (1936–2016), American politician, businessman, and ordained pastor
- Nick Mowrer (born 1988), American sport shooter
- Orval Hobart Mowrer (1907–1982), American psychologist
- Paul Scott Mowrer (1887–1971), American newspaper correspondent
