= Logan Sandler =

American writer and director

Logan Sandler is an American writer and director who is best known for his first feature film Live Cargo.

== Early life and education ==
Sandler graduated from SFTV within Loyola Marymount University's Film School in 2011 with a B.A. in Film Production, and three years later, while earning an M.F.A. from AFI in Film Directing, he developed his first feature film, Live Cargo. He developed the script with the late Seth Winston and co-writer Thymaya Payne. In 2015, Sandler was awarded the Institute's Franklin J. Schaffner Fellow Award for his short film, Tracks.

== Career ==
Sandler's senior thesis, All It Will Ever Be premiered at the Bermuda International Film Festival in 2012. Sandler's second short film Tracks screened at various festival around the world, including AFI FEST, Marfa Film Fest, Cambridge Film Festival, and the Miami International Film Festival. The film won the Lexus Audience Award for Best Short film at the Miami International Film Festival and best actor for Keith Stanfield at the 24 FPS International Film Festival.

Sandler's debut feature film Live Cargo was filmed in the Bahamas, and premiered at the Tribeca Film Festival in 2016. The film stars Dree Hemingway, Keith Stanfield, and Robert Wisdom. In addition to the 2016 Tribeca Film Festival, Live Cargo had its European premiere at the Warsaw International Film Festival, then went on to screen at the American Film Festival in Poland, the São Paulo International Film Festival, the Denver Film Festival, the Key West Film Festival, the Torino Film Festival, the Bahamas International Film Festival, and AFI FEST.

Sandler has collaborated with Stanfield on music videos, co-directing the group MOORS’ single Gas. The music video premiered on Vice’s music channel Noisey.

IONCINEMA.com chose Sandler as their IONCINEPHILE of the Month for April 2017, a feature that focuses on an emerging filmmaker from the world of cinema. When asked about his favorite films of his formative years Sandler said, "I fell in love with Jean Luc Godard’s Contempt and Weekend. I was blown away by Agnes Varda’s Cleo from 5 to 7. Michelangelo Antonioni’s films really struck a chord with me as well. After seeing L’Avventura and Blowup, I went online and ordered every film of his I could find. The Passenger’s penultimate shot blew me away. I watched that 7 minute shot over and over. It’s probably my favorite shot in the history of cinema."

== Critical reception ==
Angelica Jade Bastien for Roger Ebert wrote of the film, "In 'Live Cargo,' director/co-writer Logan Sandler strives to tell a story that finds poetry in the commonplace by shirking narrative conventions."

Chuck Wilson for The Village Voice wrote, "The well-acted Live Cargo, which also features Robert Wisdom and Sam Dillon, is at its best when it observes character acting silently against landscape, as when Nadine goes snorkeling and uses a spear gun to jab at sharks, a juxtaposition of natural beauty and human fury typical of Sandler’s poetic approach.” Wilson as well called Sandler "a filmmaker to watch."

Katie Walsh in her IndieWire review wrote, ”Anchored by a quartet of equally strong and understated performances, LIVE CARGO proves itself to be a singularly artful film of great emotional heft.” Walsh gave the film an A - grade.

Stephen Saito for The Moveable Fest in his review and interview wrote, "While there’s intrigue aplenty as anxieties rise higher than the tide, the assured hand of director Logan Sandler, who co-wrote the script with Thymaya Payne, guides 'Live Cargo' admirably as a thriller that may appear immediately as monochrome but shifts quickly into varying degrees of grey.”

H. Nelson Tracey of Cinemacy wrote that Sandler's, “Live Cargo is an unforgettable debut and a promise of greater heights to come.”

Justin Lowe of the Hollywood Reporter in his review stated, “A pronounced sense of style and place suffuses the entire film, boding well for Sandler’s future projects.”

== Awards/Nominations ==
Year	Awards	Category	Recipient	Outcome
2016	Tribeca Film Festival	Best Narrative Feature	Live Cargo	Nominated
2016	Miami International Film Festival	Audience Award for Best Short Film	Tracks	Won
2015	American Film Institute (AFI)	Franklin J. Schaffner Fellow Award	Logan Sandler	Won
2015	AFI FEST	Grand Jury Prize for Live Action Short Film	Tracks	Nominated
2012	Bermuda International Film Festival	Bermuda Shorts Award for Best Short Film	All It Will Ever Be	Nominated
