= Thymaya Payne =

American film director

Thymaya Payne is a director and producer, best known for his documentary film Stolen Seas, an in-depth exploration of Somali piracy.

== Biography ==
He is the son of Kathleen Frazer and Lewis Payne. His mother Kathleen was a child advocate and local feminist politician in Kingston New York. His father Lewis Payne was a China expert and consultant. Thymaya's name means "your illusion" in Sanskrit.

Thymaya spent much of his childhood traveling back and forth between Asia, New York City and upstate New York. In an attempt to escape the instability of his childhood he graduated from high school early and attended the University of Chicago at sixteen. His father had died when he was thirteen with complications related to HIV/AIDS and his mother died when he was eighteen of cancer.

After college Thymaya started an art collective and published art and fashion zines while living in NY, Berlin and Paris. In 2004 he continued on to graduate school at the American Film Institute. Since film school he has become an award-winning documentary and narrative filmmaker. Alongside his filmmaking, Thymaya continues his writing practice and is the author of various short stories and novellas, including "Cardamon" and "C7", written while living in Mexico City.

Thymaya currently lives and works in Venice California.

== Film career ==
In 2013 he released the documentary, Stolen Seas.

In 2015, Thymaya co-wrote and produced the independent film Live Cargo directed by Logan Sandler, starring Lakeith Stanfield and Dree Hemingway. Live Cargo premiered in competition at the 2016 Tribeca Film Festival and international at the Warsaw Film Festival among others and had its theatrical debut in spring 2017.

He was also an associate producer on several independent films including Justin Kelly's, King Cobra (2016) starring James Franco and Christian Slater. Thymaya also co-wrote a short film called Across Our Lands, directed by Fiona Godivier, which premiered at the Cannes Film Festival in 2017.
