= George Hemingway (cricketer) =

English cricketer

George Edward Hemingway (29 January 1872 — 11 March 1907) was an English cricketer. He was a right-handed batsman and left-arm bowler who played for Gloucestershire. He was born in Macclesfield and died in Rangoon.

Hemingway made a single first-class appearance for the team, during the 1898 season, against Yorkshire. From the lower-middle order, Hemingway scored a duck in each innings in which he batted, as Gloucestershire lost the match by an innings margin.

Hemingway's brothers, Ralph and William, both played first-class cricket.
