= William Hemingway =

English cricketer (1873–1967)

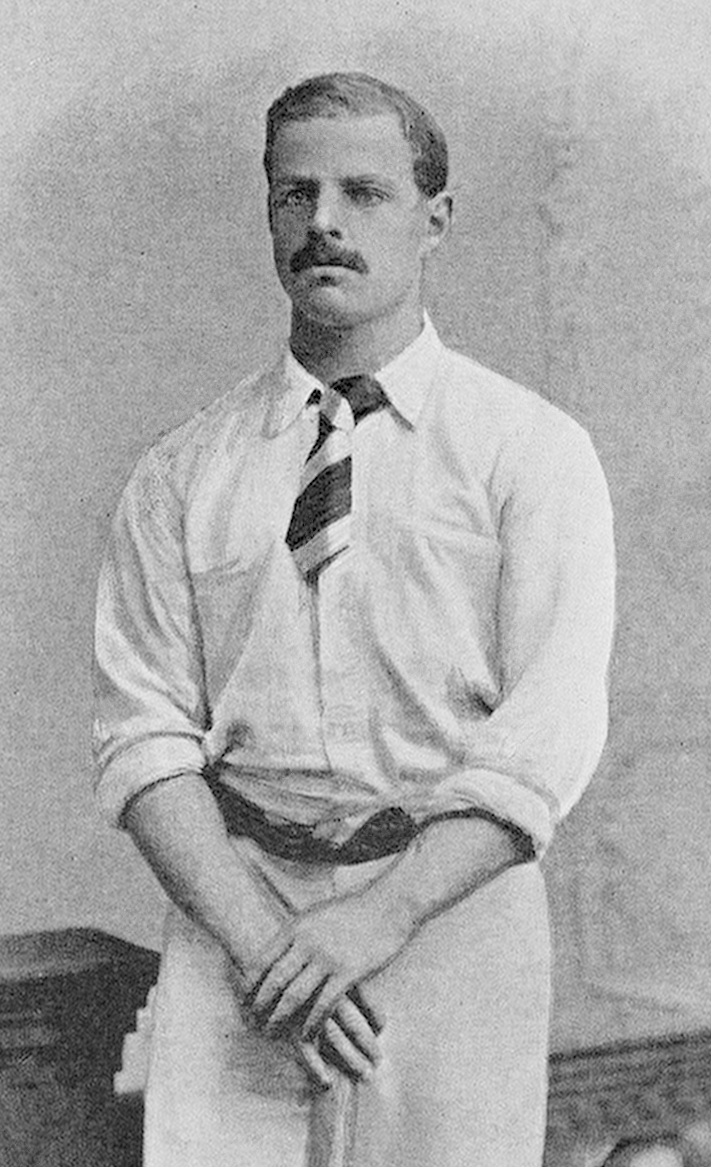

Personal information
- Full name: William McGregor Hemingway
- Born: 12 November 1873; Macclesfield, Cheshire, England
- Died: 11 February 1967 (aged 93); Paignton, Devon, England
- Batting: Right-handed
- Relatives: George Hemingway (brother); Ralph Hemingway (brother)

Domestic team information
- Years: Team
- 1893–1900: Gloucestershire
- 1895–1896: Cambridge University

Career statistics
Competition	First-class
Matches	70
Runs scored	1,999
Batting average	17.08
100s/50s	1/10
Top score	104
Catches/stumpings	30/–
- Source: CricketArchive, 31 October 2012

William McGregor Hemingway (12 November 1873 – 11 February 1967) was an English first-class cricketer who played for Gloucestershire and Cambridge University from 1893 to 1900. He was born at Macclesfield in Cheshire in 1873.

== Cricket career ==
In June 1888, Hemingway made his first appearance for Uppingham School before going up to King's College, Cambridge. He made his first-class debut for Gloucestershire in a County Championship match against Nottinghamshire in June, 1893. His highest score of 104 was scored in a match against Cambridge University in May 1895. He died in 1967 at Paignton, Devon.
