= Mariel Hemingway =

American actress (born 1961)

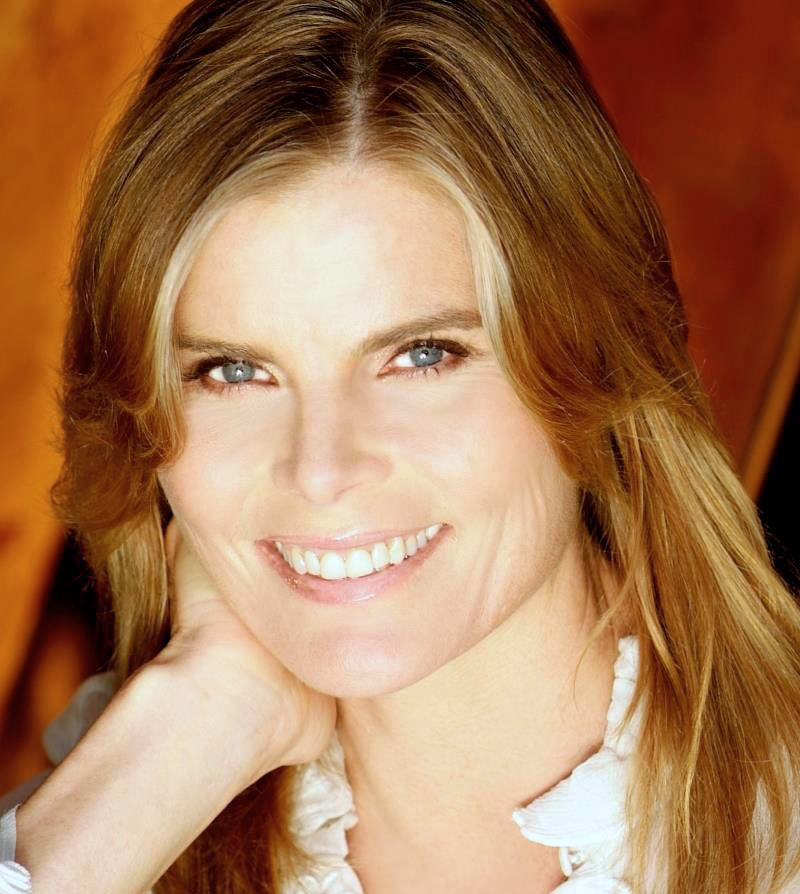
- Hemingway in 2011
- Born: November 22, 1961 (age 64); Mill Valley, California, U.S.
- Education: Boston University
- Occupations: Actress; author; television presenter; mental health activist
- Years active: 1976–present
- Spouse: Stephen Crisman (m. 1984; div. 2009)
- Partner: Bobby Williams (2011–present)
- Children: Dree Hemingway; Langley Fox
- Father: Jack Hemingway
- Relatives: Margaux Hemingway (sister); Ernest Hemingway (paternal grandfather); Hadley Richardson (paternal grandmother)

Mariel Hemingway (born November 22, 1961) is an American actress, author, and mental health activist. She made her film debut at age 14 with a Golden Globe Award-nominated part in Lipstick (1976). For her performance in Woody Allen's Manhattan (1979), Hemingway received a nomination for the Academy Award for Best Supporting Actress.

Following a string of leading roles in Personal Best (1982), Star 80 (1983), The Mean Season, and Creator (both 1985), Hemingway received a further Golden Globe nomination for her portrayal of Sydney Guilford on the legal drama series Civil Wars (1991–1993). Her acting career slowed in the late 1990s, at which point she focused on advocating for mental health awareness. For producing and starring in the acclaimed documentary Running from Crazy (2013), which focused on her family's struggles with mental illness, Hemingway received a humanitarian award from the San Diego Film Festival. She is the author of various self-help and wellness books, a cookbook, and three memoirs: Finding My Balance (2003), Invisible Girl, and Out Came the Sun (both 2015).

== Early life ==
She is the daughter of Jack Hemingway and Byra Louise "Puck" Whittlesey. Her paternal grandparents were Ernest Hemingway and Hadley Richardson while Grace Hall Hemingway was her paternal great-grandmother.

Hemingway's sisters were Joan "Muffet" and Margot "Margaux"; the latter was a model and actress.

Mariel spent several years of her childhood in Sun Valley, Idaho living the life of a teenager unaffected by show business, doing odd jobs such as babysitting for local residents.

== Career in film ==
Hemingway's first role was with her real-life sister Margaux (also in her debut role) in the film Lipstick (1976), in which they played sisters. She received notice for her acting and was nominated as "Best Newcomer" for the Golden Globe Award that year. Her highest-profile role was in Woody Allen's Manhattan (1979), a romantic comedy in which she plays Tracy, a high school student and Allen's lover. She was nominated for an Academy Award for Best Supporting Actress.

In Personal Best (1982), she played a bisexual track-and-field athlete in a film noted for its same-sex love scenes. In connection with Personal Best, she appeared in a nude pictorial in the April 1982 issue of Playboy and was on the cover.

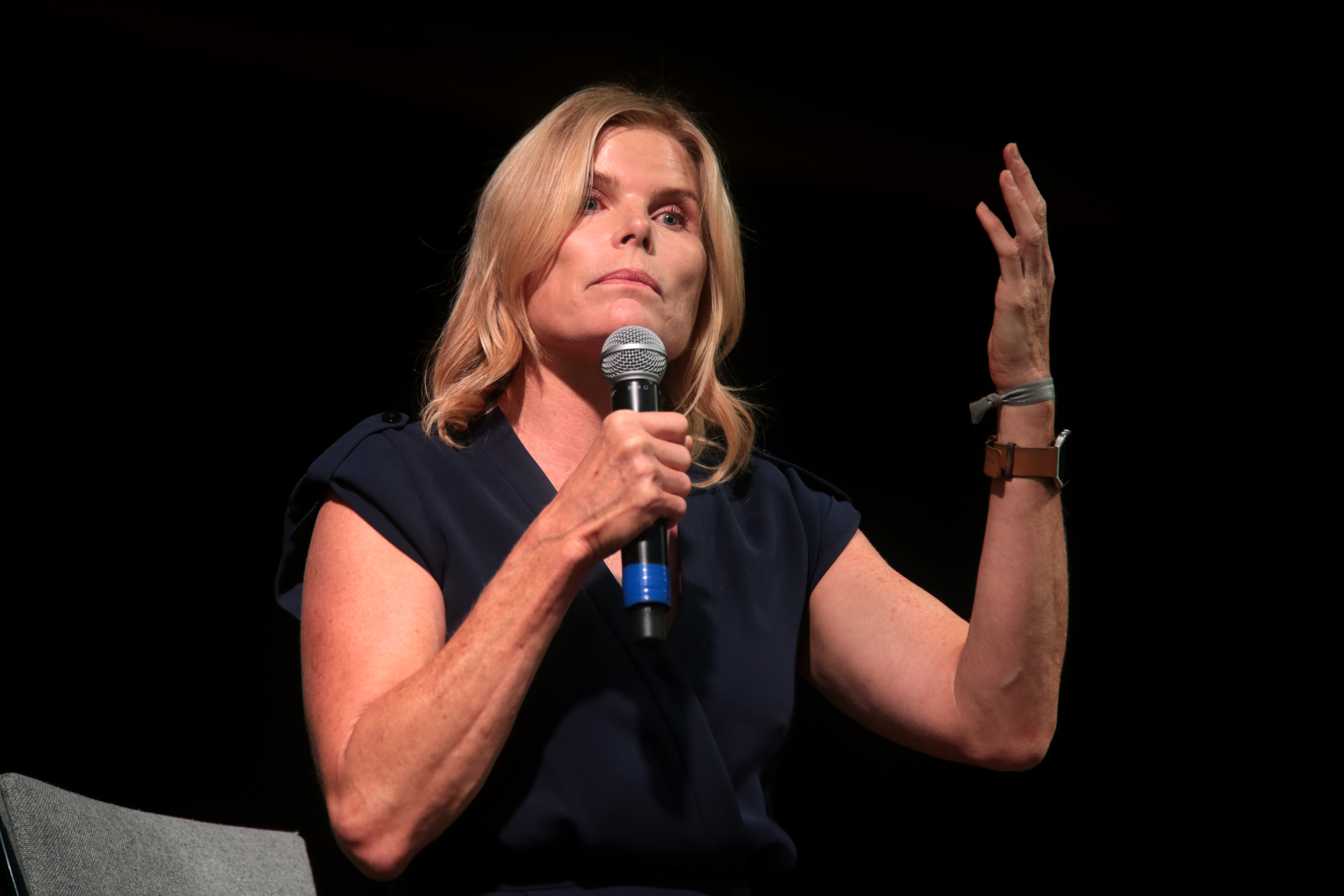
Hemingway in April 2017

She starred as Dorothy Stratten in Star 80 (1983), a film about the Playboy model's life and murder. Reports circulated for years that Hemingway had her breasts enlarged to play the role of Stratten, but during a 2007 appearance on the late-night talk and variety show, Fashionably Late with Stacy London, she said she had had the surgery before Star 80. Her breast implants were removed years later after they had ruptured.

She was featured in Superman IV: The Quest for Peace (1987) as Lacy Warfield. Subsequently released additional footage showed an expansion of her role. She starred in the 1991–93 legal drama Civil Wars for ABC, for which she was nominated for a Golden Globe, and co-starred with musician, artist, and film director John Mellencamp in the critically acclaimed 1991 film Falling from Grace. She was cast as the female lead in Darren Star's CBS drama Central Park West for the 1995–96 season; however, the show fared poorly with both critics and viewers, and after 13 episodes Hemingway was told that the show wanted her to accept a deep pay cut and demotion to recurring character status. She quit the series, which only lasted eight more episodes before being cancelled. In 1996, she had a leading role in the British TV movie September, playing the wife of Michael York.

She has played a lesbian or bisexual woman in several films and television shows, including Personal Best, The Sex Monster, In Her Line of Fire, and episodes of the TV series Roseanne ("Don't Ask, Don't Tell" and "December Bride") and Crossing Jordan. Hemingway is heterosexual, but has said she formed a "big connection with the LGBT community" after Personal Best and enjoys taking roles in "cutting-edge" productions.

Hemingway has starred in and co-produced videos about yoga and holistic living. In 2002, she published a yoga memoir, Finding My Balance. She is currently the host of Spiritual Cinema, a monthly television show dedicated to spiritual films. She has begun hosting a series of yoga practice videos known as Yoga Now, with guru Rodney Yee.

Hemingway worked on the documentary film Running from Crazy, directed by Barbara Kopple and produced by the Oprah Winfrey Network chronicling the Hemingway family's history of suicide, substance abuse and mental illness, shown at the Sundance Film Festival in 2013. In October that year, Hemingway received a humanitarian award from the San Diego Film Festival for her role in the documentary. Her memoirs Invisible Girl and Out Came the Sun were released in 2015 by Regan Arts.

== Personal life ==
Hemingway married Stephen Crisman in 1984. They have two daughters: Dree Hemingway and Langley Fox. They separated in 2008 and divorced the following year.

In 1996, her sister Margaux died of a barbiturate overdose at age 42. She was the fifth to die of suicide in four generations of Hemingways and her family had difficulty accepting the fact of her suicide.

In 2010, Hemingway wrote the foreword to yoga teacher Mark Stephens book Teaching Yoga, describing Stephens as a significant inspiration and teacher's teacher.

In early 2011, Hemingway began a relationship with former stuntman Bobby Williams with whom she has co-authored a self-help book. She practices Transcendental Meditation.

In the 2013 television documentary Running from Crazy, Hemingway talked of her bouts of mental illness and her still lingering issues with her siblings. She spoke of her family's struggles with alcoholism, mental illnesses, and suicide. In particular, she mentioned how her sister Margaux's suicide continued to haunt her. She also claimed that her parents' marriage was abusive and unhappy and discussed abusive incidents in her childhood. (Note: She states in the documentary: "When I was really small, and I shared a room with Margaux, and my dad came in the room, you know... I don't wanna call it what it was, but it wasn't right, you know... um, it's hard to have a visual of that, you don't wanna see your dad doing those things, but I know it, I know it happened. I think that my dad abused the girls [Margaux and Joan], sexually abused the girls, um, when they were young. My dad, if you met him, was not, you don't think 'oh, pedophile', or this or that, you just didn't, that's not what came to your mind at all, at all, he was a beautiful man and in many ways, but I think it happened in drunk, you know, behavior, you know 'my wife doesn't love me', I don't know what the reasons were. You know 'I'm obsessed with my daughters', I don't know why a person can even go there.... I know people would say, 'there's no way in hell your father did that'. And yet, Margaux was obsessed with him, Muffet was obsessed with him, and my mother allowed me to sleep with her my whole childhood practically. I slept with my mom from age seven to age sixteen. But I witnessed it as a kid, so... that's why I thought it never happened to me, because... I don't know why it didn't, but I just assumed it happened to them and it didn't happen to me.")

In her memoir, Out Came the Sun (2015), Hemingway discussed being propositioned by older men in Hollywood, including Bob Fosse, Robert De Niro, and Robert Towne. Woody Allen invited her on a trip to Paris, but she realized that he did not intend them to have separate rooms. Though she declined his advances, she states she continued to "love him as a friend" and was grateful that they stayed in touch in later years.

== Filmography ==
=== Film ===
Year	Title	Role	Notes
1976	Lipstick	Kathy McCormick	Nominated—Golden Globe Award for New Star of the Year – Actress
1979	Manhattan	Tracy	Nominated—Academy Award for Best Supporting Actress; Nominated—BAFTA Award for Best Actress in a Supporting Role
1982	Personal Best	Chris Cahill	
1983	Star 80	Dorothy Stratten	
1985	The Mean Season	Christine Connelly	
1985	Creator	Meli	
1987	Superman IV: The Quest for Peace	Lacy Warfield	Nominated—Razzie Award for Worst Supporting Actress
1987	The Suicide Club	Sasha Michaels	Also producer
1988	Sunset	Cheryl King	Nominated—Razzie Award for Worst Supporting Actress
1990	Fire, Ice and Dynamite	Herself	Uncredited
1991	Delirious	Janet Dubois/Louise	
1992	Falling from Grace	Alice Parks	
1994	Naked Gun 33 1/3: The Final Insult	Herself	Uncredited
1995	Deceptions II: Edge of Deception	Joan Branson	
1996	Bad Moon	Janet Harrison	
1997	Deconstructing Harry	Beth Kramer	
1997	Road Ends	Kat	
1998	Little Men	Josephine "Jo" March Baer	
1999	Kiss of a Stranger	Nova Clarke	
1999	The Sex Monster	Laura Barnes	
2000	The Contender	Cynthia Charlton Lee	
2001	Perfume	Lesse Hotton	
2001	Fourplay	Carly Matthews Portland	
2003	American Reel	Disney Rifkin	
2005	Time of Change	Mariel	
2006	In Her Line of Fire	Lynn Delaney	
2007	Nanking	Minnie Vautrin	
2007	Greetings from Earth	Helen	Short film
2008	The Golden Boys	Martha Snow	
2009	Archie's Final Project	Charlotte Silver	
2010	Ay Lav Yu	Pamela	
2013	Man Camp	Aunt Chelsea	
2014	Unity	Narrator	Documentary
2014	Lap Dance	Aunt Billie	
2015	Papa: Hemingway in Cuba	Woman Guest	
2019	The Wall of Mexico	Mayor Ann Mason	
2021	Grace and Grit	Chris	
2022	On Sacred Ground	Marion	

=== Television ===
Year	Title	Role	Notes
1976	I Want to Keep My Baby	Sue Ann Cunningham	Television movie
1987	Amerika	Kimberly Ballard	6 episodes
1988	Steal the Sky	Helen Mason	Television movie
1991	Tales from the Crypt	Miranda Singer	Episode: "Loved to Death"
1991	Into the Badlands	Alma Heusser	Television movie
1991–93	Civil Wars	Sydney Guilford	36 episodes Nominated—Golden Globe Award for Best Actress – Television Series Drama
1993	Desperate Rescue: The Cathy Mahone Story	Cathy Mahone	Television movie
1993	The Hidden Room	Jane Stark	Episode: "Stark in Love"
1994–95	Roseanne	Sharon	2 episodes
1994	Normandy: The Great Crusade	Martha Gellhorn	Television movie; voice
1995	Central Park West	Stephanie Wells	13 episodes
1995	Saturday Night Live	Herself/Host	2 episodes
1996	September	Virginia	Television movie
1996	The Crying Child	Madeline Jeffreys	Television movie
1998	Biography	Narrator	Episode: "Ernest Hemingway: Wrestling with Life"
1999	First Daughter	Alex McGregor	Television movie
2001	Becker	Ruth Sanders	2 episodes
2002	Warning: Parental Advisory	Tipper Gore	Television movie
2002	First Shot	Alex McGregor	Television movie
2002	Crossing Jordan	Lisa Fromer	Episode: "Scared Straight"
2005	See Arnold Run	Maria Shriver	Television movie
2006	Between Truth and Lies	Dr. Claire Parker	Television movie
2007	Law & Order	Ashley Jones	Episode: "Remains of the Day"
2009	Eleventh Hour	Mary Jo	Episode: "Subway"
2012	Rise of the Zombies	Dr. Lynn Snyder	Television movie
2013	Running from Crazy	Herself	Television documentary; also producer
2015	The Prince	Beverly	Television movie
2016	Finding Fortune	Madison	Television movie
2023	God's Country Song	Sara Bryan	Television movie

== Works ==
- Hemingway, Mariel (2002). Finding My Balance: A Memoir (1st ed.). Simon & Schuster. ISBN 0-7432-3807-9.
- —— (2006). Mariel Hemingway's Healthy Living from the Inside Out: Every Woman's Guide to Real Beauty, Renewed Energy, and a Radiant Life (1st ed.). HarperOne. ISBN 978-0-06-089039-1.
- —— (2009). MARIEL'S KITCHEN Simple Ingredients for a Delicious and Satisfying Life (1st ed.). HarperOne. ISBN 978-0-06-164987-5.
- —— (2013). Running With Nature (1st ed.). Changing Lives Press. ISBN 978-0988247611.
- —— & Greenman, Ben (2013). Out Came the Sun: Overcoming the Legacy of Mental Illness, Addiction, and Suicide in My Family (1st ed.). Regan Arts. ISBN 978-1941393239.
- —— (2015). Invisible Girl (1st ed.). Regan Arts. ISBN 978-1941393-24-6.
