= Lipstick (1976 film) =

1976 film by Lamont Johnson

- Theatrical release poster
- Directed by: Lamont Johnson
- Screenplay by: David Rayfiel
- Produced by: Freddie Fields
- Starring: Margaux Hemingway; Chris Sarandon; Perry King; Anne Bancroft
- Cinematography: Bill Butler
- Edited by: Marion Rothman
- Music by: Michel Polnareff
- Production company: Dino De Laurentiis Corporation
- Distributed by: Paramount Pictures
- Release date: April 2, 1976
- Running time: 89 minutes
- Country: United States
- Language: English
- Budget: $3.5 million
- Box office: $8.3 million

Lipstick is a 1976 American rape and revenge thriller film directed by Lamont Johnson and starring Margaux Hemingway, Chris Sarandon, Perry King, and Anne Bancroft. Mariel Hemingway also has a supporting role as Margaux's onscreen sister. The film follows a fashion model who is raped by her teenage sister's music teacher. Upon his acquittal in court, he rapes her sister, leading her to enact a brutal revenge.

== Plot ==
Christine "Chris" McCormick is a highly paid fashion model whose image serves as the driving force of the ad campaign for a popular brand of lipstick and can be seen in magazines and on billboards all around the world. Gordon Stuart, a part-time composer and full-time music teacher, eagerly accepts an invitation from Chris's 13 to 14-year-old sister Kathy to come to a secluded beachside photo shoot, so Chris can listen to some of his music. He arrives at her apartment one day to visit her, but is interrupted by a phone call from her lover, Steve Edison.

As Chris talks to Steve, Gordon begins to fume at the thought of Chris's obvious rejection. His hurt soon turns to anger and he enters her room, assaults her, smears her face with the lipstick she helps promote, and then brutally rapes her. Toward the end of the ordeal, Kathy returns home from school, walks in on Chris and Gordon, and flees. Gordon gets up and suggests Kathy join them and "have some fun", but instead cuts Chris free and leaves.

Gordon is arrested, but as Chris learns from Carla Bondi, the prosecutor assigned to handle the case, Gordon's conviction is hardly assured and Carla asks Chris to testify against him. Gordon's attorney argues that the sex was consensual, and that its roughness was the result of Chris's "own twisted desires". He also suggests that even if Gordon acted without her consent, she provoked him by appearing naked in front of him at the photo shoot where they first met and by the inherent sensuality of the photographs from which she makes her living. Gordon is ultimately acquitted.

Chris leaves her job modeling for the lipstick company and plans to relocate to Colorado with Kathy after her last photo shoot. The photo shoot takes place at the same abandoned building where Kathy's school is rehearsing a new ballet orchestrated by Gordon. Kathy encounters Gordon and flees when he starts fondling her, but Gordon chases her down and rapes her.

Kathy returns to the photo shoot and tells Chris what happened. Gripped in a murderous frenzy, Chris runs outside to her car and grabs a rifle she had intended to take to Colorado with her. She spots Gordon driving his car in the parking lot and shoots at it, causing it to crash. As Gordon climbs out of the wreck, Chris keeps shooting him until he is dead, before the rifle is empty. The police arrive shortly after and arrest her. Later, Carla speaks to a jury, telling them that their acquittal of Gordon earlier resulted in Chris losing faith in the law. The jury ultimately finds Chris not guilty of murder.

== Cast ==
- Margaux Hemingway as Christine "Chris" McCormick
- Chris Sarandon as Gordon Stuart
- Perry King as Steve Edison
- Anne Bancroft as Carla Bondi
- Robin Gammell as Nathan Cartwright
- John Bennett Perry as Martin McCormick
- Mariel Hemingway as Kathy McCormick
- Francesco as Francesco
- Meg Wylie as Sister Margaret
- Inga Swenson as Sister Monica
- Lauren Jones as policewoman
- Catherine McLeod as Vogue lady

== Reception ==
On the review aggregator website Rotten Tomatoes, the film holds an approval rating of 18% based on 11 reviews, with an average rating of 4.8/10.

Lipstick was met with negative critical reception upon release, with much of the criticism focused around the film's treatment of rape, which was perceived as purely exploitative. Roger Ebert called it "a nasty little item masquerading as a bold statement on the crime of rape. The statement would seem a little bolder if the movie didn't linger in violent and graphic detail over the rape itself, and then handle the vengeance almost as an afterthought." However, Ebert did single out the performance of Mariel Hemingway, writing that "like a veteran, she's unaffected and convincing on camera and, whether she knows it or not, she can act." Vincent Canby of The New York Times remarked the film's glamorous photography, but said it was "anti-intellectual in the ways that B movies always have been."

Variety reviewed the film with a similar sentiment, declaring: "Lipstick has pretensions of being an intelligent treatment of the tragedy of female rape. But by the time it's over, the film has shown its true colors as just another cynical violence exploitation."

Harlan Ellison, writing in March 1977, said: "Lipstick panders to the basest, vilest, lowest possible common denominators of urban fear and lynch logic. It is the sort of film that, if you see it in a ghetto theater filled with blacks, will scare the bejeezus out of you. The animal fury this film unleashes in an audience is terrifying to behold. It gives exploitation a bad name; and it has less to do with rape, which is the commercial hook on which they've hung the saleability of this bit of putrescence than it does with the cynicism of Joseph E. Levine, a man who probably has no trouble sleeping with a troubled conscience."

== Soundtrack ==
Lipstick

Soundtrack album by Michel Polnareff
- Released: 1976
- Length: 28:44
- Label: Atlantic

The soundtrack to the film was by French singer Michel Polnareff who released the album in 1976 on Atlantic Records. The soundtrack became a disco success on its own in the United States and internationally.

No.	Title	Length
1.	"Lipstick"	3:33
2.	"Lipstick Montage"	12:37
3.	"The Rapist"	10:57
4.	"Ballet"	2:17
Total length:		28:44

== Remake ==
The film inspired an Indian remake in Hindi, titled Insaaf Ka Tarazu (1980).
