= Langley Fox =

American illustrator and model (born 1989)

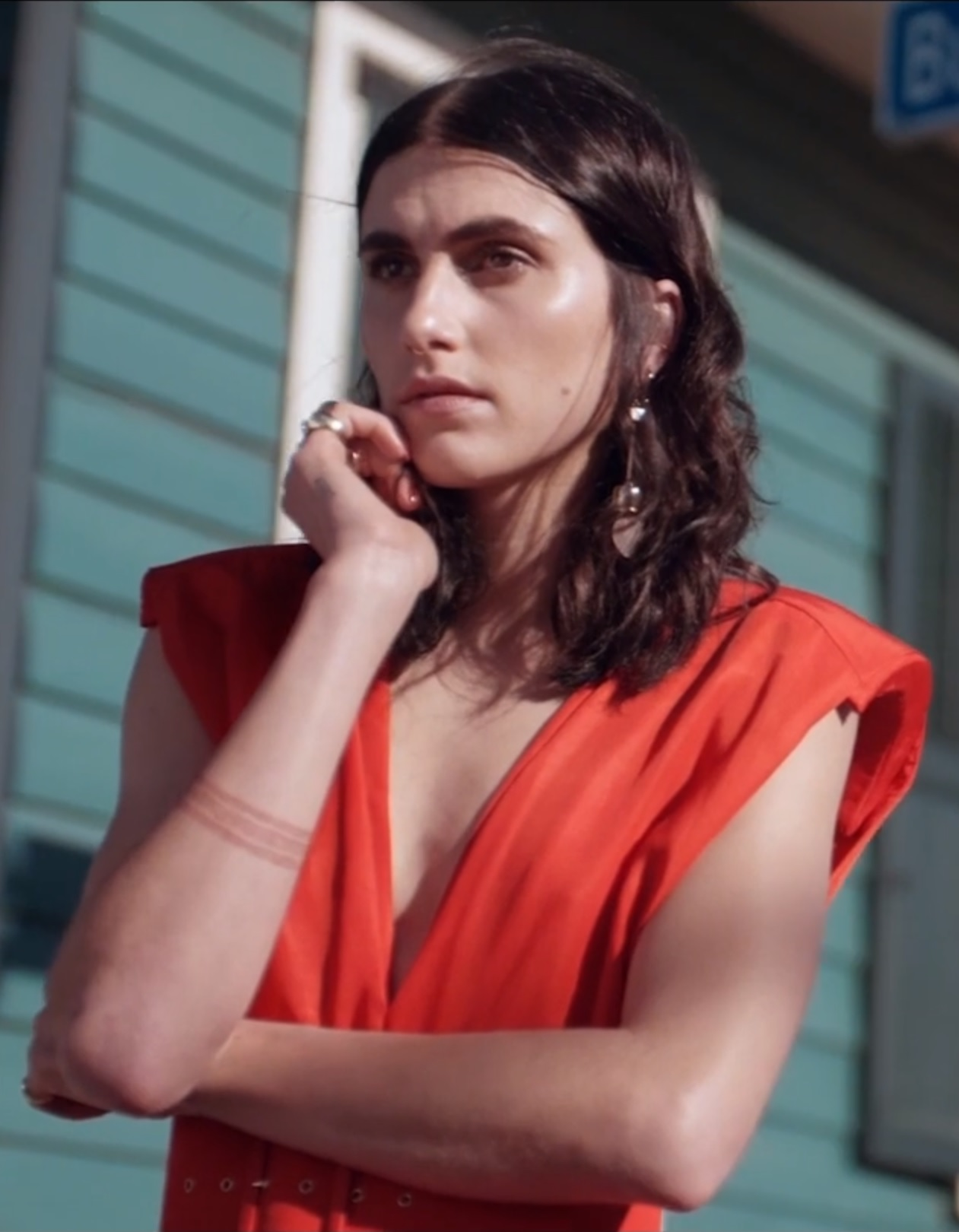
- Fox in 2017
- Born: Langley Fox Crisman Hemingway; August 22, 1989 (age 37)
- Education: Otis College of Art and Design
- Occupations: Artist, model, actress
- Mother: Mariel Hemingway
- Relatives: Dree Hemingway (sister); Ernest Hemingway (great-grandfather); Hadley Richardson (great-grandmother); Grace Hall Hemingway (maternal great-great-grandmother)

Langley Fox Crisman Hemingway (born August 22, 1989) is an American artist, actress, and model based out of Los Angeles, California. She is the daughter of actress Mariel Hemingway and documentary filmmaker Stephen Crisman, the younger sister of model Dree Hemingway, and the great-granddaughter of author Ernest Hemingway. Her given surname is Hemingway and Fox is her middle name.

After graduating from Otis College of Art and Design, she began working as an artist and model managed by Next Management. Her artwork is mostly photorealistic pencil drawings, mostly inspired by her childhood in Ketchum, Idaho, and is often involved with fashion.

By 2014 she had been commissioned for design work by Alice + Olivia, Louis Vuitton, and the handbag label TL-180, and designed a popup store for Marc Jacobs, and had modeled in a campaign for Marc Jacobs' Dot perfume and had done runway work at New York Fashion Week. By 2016 she had done design work for Tumi Inc. She has had art shows with Tasya Van Ree, Andrew Kuykendall, and Nothing Serious.
