= Paul Scott Mowrer =

American newspaper correspondent

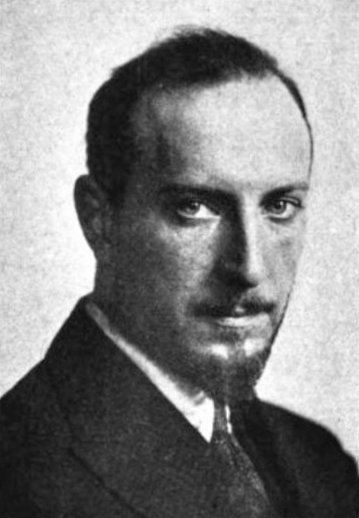
- Born: July 14, 1887; Bloomington, Illinois
- Died: April 4, 1971 (aged 83); Beaufort, South Carolina
- Education: University of Michigan
- Occupation: Newspaper correspondent
- Spouses: Winifred Adams (m. 1909; div. 1933) Hadley Richardson (m. 1933)
- Relatives: Edgar Ansel Mowrer (brother)
- Writing career
- Notable awards: Pulitzer Prize for Correspondence

Paul Scott Mowrer (July 14, 1887 – April 4, 1971) was an American newspaper correspondent.

== Early life and career ==
Paul Scott Mowrer was born in Bloomington, Illinois on July 14, 1887. He studied at the University of Michigan and began his newspaper career in 1905 as a reporter in Chicago. He was a correspondent at the front during the First Balkan War and again in the War in Europe from 1914 to 1918. In 1921 he acted as special correspondent of the Disarmament Conference. In 1929 he was awarded the first Pulitzer Prize for Correspondence while at the Chicago Daily News. He also contributed many articles to magazines on world politics. In 1968, he was named Poet Laureate of New Hampshire.

His brother Edgar Ansel Mowrer also won the Pulitzer Prize for Correspondence, in 1933.

== Personal life ==
Mowrer married Winifred Adams on May 8, 1909. They divorced in April 1933.

In the spring of 1927, Mowrer met Hadley Richardson shortly after her divorce from Ernest Hemingway. On July 3, 1933, after a five-year courtship, Richardson and Mowrer married in London. Richardson was especially grateful to Mowrer for his warm relationship with Jack "Bumby" Hemingway, her son from her former marriage to Hemingway. Soon after the marriage, they moved to a suburb of Chicago, where they lived during World War II.

Mowrer died in Beaufort, South Carolina on April 4, 1971.

== Works ==
- Hours of France, poems (1918)
- Balkanized Europe: A Study in Political Analysis and Reconstruction (1921)
- House of Europe, autobiography (1945)
- On Going to Live in New Hampshire, poems (1953)

== Bibliography ==
- "Divorce Given Wife of Newspaper Man". The San Bernardino Sun. Paris (published April 23, 1933). April 22, 1933. p. 3 – via Newspapers.com.
- "Council Keeps 'Pure Lottery' Off Ballot". The Portsmouth Herald. October 1, 1968. p. 7 – via Newspapers.com.
- "Paul Scott Mowrer". The Beaufort Gazette. April 8, 1971. p. 9 – via Newspapers.com.
- Workman, Brooke (1983). "Twenty-Nine Things I Know about Bumby Hemingway". The English Journal. 72 (2): 24–26. doi:10.2307/816722. JSTOR 816722.
- Brennan, Elizabeth A.; Clarage, Elizabeth C. (1999). Who's Who of Pulitzer Prize Winners. Oryx Press. p. 70 – via Google Books.
- Kert, Bernice (1999) [1983]. The Hemingway Women. Norton. ISBN 0-393-31835-4.
