= Over the Brooklyn Bridge =

1984 film by Menahem Golan

- Theatrical release poster
- Directed by: Menahem Golan
- Written by: Arnold Somkin
- Produced by: Menahem Golan; Yoram Globus
- Starring: Elliott Gould; Margaux Hemingway; Sid Caeser; Burt Young; Shelley Winters
- Cinematography: Adam Greenberg
- Edited by: Mark Goldblatt
- Music by: Pino Donaggio
- Production company: City Films
- Distributed by: Cannon Films; MGM/UA
- Release date: March 2, 1984
- Running time: 106 minutes
- Country: United States
- Language: English
- Budget: $4 million
- Box office: $837,914

Over the Brooklyn Bridge is a 1984 American romantic comedy film directed and produced by Menahem Golan, written by Arnold Somkin, and starring Elliott Gould. It had the working title of My Darling Shiksa, referring to a Shiksa, a woman outside of the Jewish faith. The film depicts a Jewish man being forced to break up with his gentile girlfriend.

== Plot ==
Alby Sherman is a Jewish man whose father died when he was young. He and his mother run a luncheonette in Brooklyn, but Alby has negotiated the purchase of an upscale restaurant in Manhattan, a project he cannot finance on his own. He asks his wealthy Uncle Benjamin to lend him the money. His uncle imposes only one requirement: he will lend Alby the money, but only if he leaves his "shiksa" (gentile) girlfriend.

== Cast ==
- Elliott Gould as Alby Sherman
- Margaux Hemingway as Elizabeth Anderson
- Sid Caesar as Uncle Benjamin
- Burt Young as Phil
- Shelley Winters as Becky Sherman
- Carol Kane as Cheryl
- Sarah Michelle Gellar as Phil's Daughter (uncredited)
- Robert Gossett as Eddie

== Production ==
The film was budgeted at $4 million and scheduled for six weeks. Golan completed it in five weeks, $500,000 under budget.

== See also ==
- List of films featuring diabetes
