= Live Cargo =

2016 film by Logan Sandler

- Theatrical poster for film
- Directed by: Logan Sandler
- Written by: Logan Sandler; Thymaya Payne
- Produced by: Rene Bastian; Lauren Brady; Mortimer Canepa; Randolph Hearst Harris; Thymaya Payne
- Starring: Dree Hemingway; Keith Stanfield; Robert Wisdom
- Cinematography: Daniella Nowitz
- Edited by: Nick Ellsberg; Garret Price
- Music by: Brooke Blair; Will Blair
- Production company: SimonSays Entertainment
- Release date: April 16, 2016 (US)
- Running time: 88 minutes
- Country: United States
- Language: English

Live Cargo is a 2016 dramatic thriller which premiered in competition on April 15, 2016 at the Tribeca Film Festival. The film was directed by Logan Sandler, his first feature film. Live Cargo's script was co-written by Sandler and Thymaya Payne, who produced and directed the award-winning documentary Stolen Seas. The film stars Dree Hemingway, LaKeith Stanfield, and Robert Wisdom. Live Cargo was featured alongside five other films in the Champs-Élysées Film Festival's U.S. in Progress Paris section, as well as participating in IFP's 11th annual Independent Filmmaker Lab.

== Plot ==
Following a devastating loss, Nadine (Dree Hemingway) and Lewis (Keith Stanfield) retreat to a small Bahamian island where Nadine's family has kept a house for many years. As they try to heal and move forward with their relationship, the community on the island shows signs of unraveling—with the island's mayor, Roy (Robert Wisdom), squaring off against Doughboy (Leonard Earl Howze), a human trafficker who manipulates the impressionable homeless teenager Myron (Sam Dillon) into assisting with his smuggling operation.

== Cast ==
- Dree Hemingway as Nadine
- Keith Stanfield as Lewis
- Robert Wisdom as Roy
- Leonard Earl Howze as Doughboy
- Sam Dillon as Myron

== Reception ==
LA Times and IndieWire film critic Katie Walsh described the film as, "a mood piece, a tone poem of a place, a mythic tragedy driven by devastatingly human fallibilities. Anchored by a quartet of equally strong and understated performances by Hemingway, Stanfield, Wisdom, and Dillon, 'Live Cargo' proves itself to be a singularly artful film of great emotional heft." She praised the film's aesthetic, "The black-and-white cinematography references films of the 1960s like I Am Cuba, and the imagery relies on abstraction to build a moody lyrical tone. Portrait-style shots and composed moments of stillness harken toward fine-art photography, using editing as an evocative mode of storytelling — a dramatic storm is rendered in quickly edited shots of crashing waves on rocks and faces in the night."

Den of Geek’s Natalie Zutter rated the film four out of five stars, and called the black-and-white drama “arresting”. In describing the film’s atmosphere, she wrote, “The waves around the island roil ominously, reminding viewers of how deadly the water can be, especially when paired with thunderstorms from above.”

Steven Saito of The Moveable Fest wrote: “While there’s intrigue aplenty as anxieties rise higher than the tide, the assured hand of director Logan Sandler, who co-wrote the script with Thymaya Payne, guides 'Live Cargo' admirably as a thriller that may appear immediately as monochrome but shifts quickly into varying degrees of grey. Embedding Hemingway and Stanfield, two leads you already have trouble taking your eyes off of, in an environment where it truly feels like anything can happen, whether it’s an impromptu street parade of dancers and bongo drummers known as Junkanoo or the constantly shifting alliances between those residing on the island, the film proves to be intoxicating, apt to swallow you up in cinematographer Daniella Nowitz’s glorious use of the widest framing possible.”

Sam Dillon's performance as Myron was named to IndieWire's list of 11 break out actors from this year's Tribeca Film Festival, with Kate Erbland writing: "Logan Sandler's stark black and white drama features some wrenching ideas – it features Keith Stanfield and Dree Hemingway as a couple mourning the death of their child – and an impressive cast, but Dillon's turn as an obsessive homeless youth colors the entire thing in unnerving (and special) ways."

== Festivals ==
In addition to the 2016 Tribeca Film Festival, Live Cargo had its European premiere at the Warsaw International Film Festival, then went on to screen at the American Film Festival in Poland, the São Paulo International Film Festival, the Denver Film Festival, the Key West Film Festival, the Torino Film Festival, the Bahamas International Film Festival, and AFI FEST.

== Awards ==
Live Cargo was nominated for Best U.S. Narrative Feature at the 2016 Tribeca Film Festival. Live Cargo won the New Visions Award at the 2016 Bahamas International Film Festival.

== Production ==
Live Cargo was filmed on location in the Bahamas, and shot entirely in black and white.
