= Edgar Ansel Mowrer =

American journalist (1892–1977)

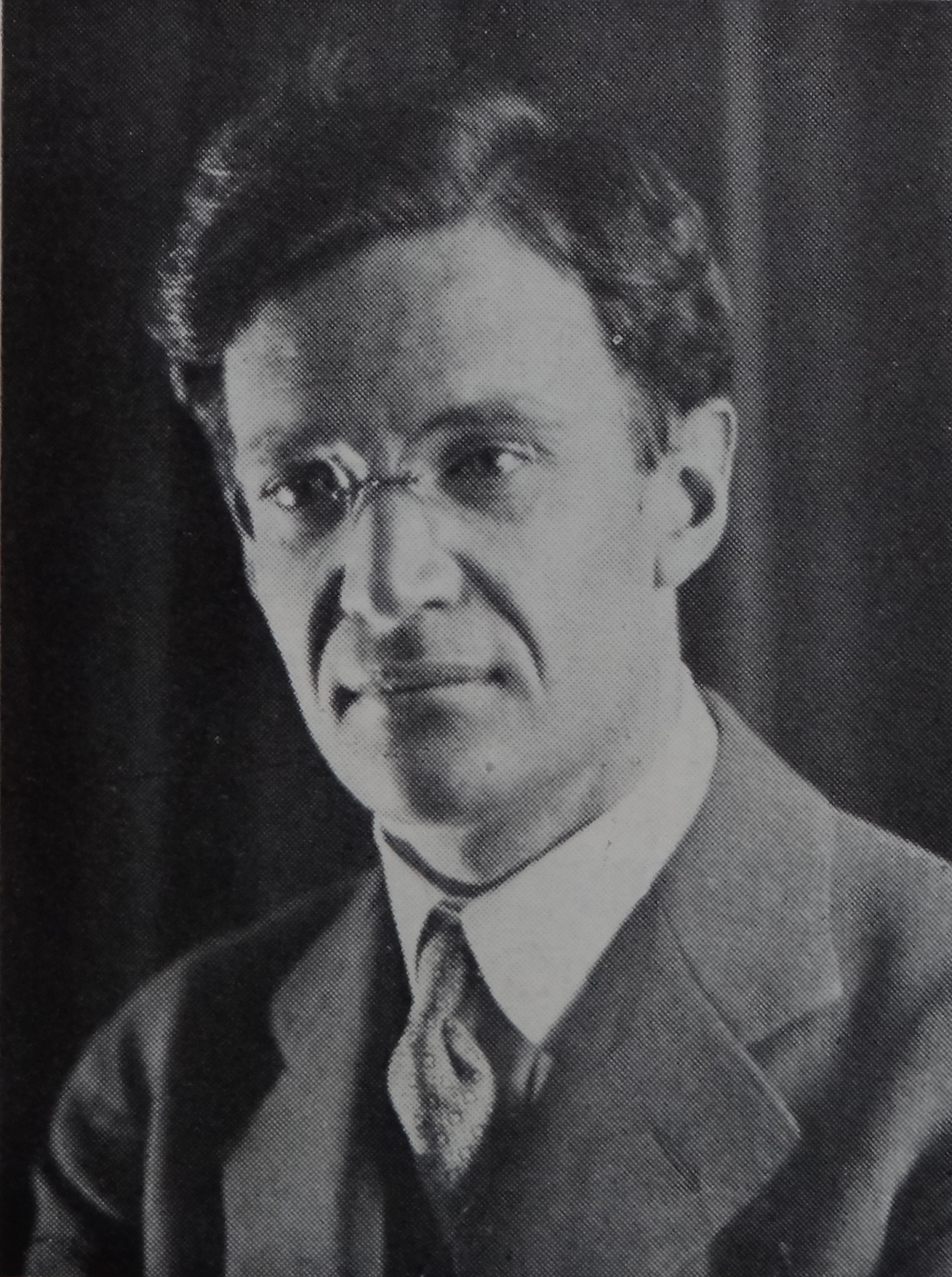
- Born: March 8, 1892; Bloomington, Illinois, U.S.
- Died: March 2, 1977 (aged 84); Madeira, Portugal
- Education: University of Chicago; University of Michigan (1913)
- Occupations: Journalist, writer
- Family: Paul Scott Mowrer (brother)
- Awards: Pulitzer Prize in Correspondence in 1933, Legion d'Honneur, France, date unknown

Edgar Ansel Mowrer (March 8, 1892 – March 2, 1977) was an American journalist and writer who won a Pulitzer Prize in 1933.

== Life and career ==
Born on March 8, 1892, in Bloomington, Illinois to Rufus and Nellie (née Scott), Mowrer graduated from the University of Michigan in 1913. From his elder brother, Paul Scott Mowrer, the editor of Chicago Daily News, Mowrer received a job and in 1914 went to France as a foreign correspondent. From there he reported on events throughout the First World War, including the Italians' defeat at the Battle of Caporetto. In 1916, he married Lilian Thomson; the two had a daughter, Diana, and would remain together until Mowrer's death 61 years later. In May 1915, he was assigned to the Rome office of the Chicago Daily News, and there he interviewed Benito Mussolini, then a Socialist, who was urging Italy to enter the war on the side of the Allies. After his marriage in London in February 1916, Mowrer returned with his wife to Italy, where he covered the battlefronts and witnessed the Italian defeat at Caporetto in 1917.

Mowrer remained a correspondent in Europe throughout the 1920s and 1930s, living in Rome for eight years until 1923, before moving to Berlin. In 1933, Mowrer won the Pulitzer Prize for Correspondence for his reporting on the rise of Adolf Hitler in Germany and was named president of the Berlin Foreign Press Association. In his dispatches from Germany, he had managed to cut below the patina of normalcy to capture events that challenged the belief that Germany's transformation was democratic and natural; he was therefore a target of Nazi ire. In addition to reporting for the Chicago Daily News, Mowrer wrote a best-selling book, Germany Puts the Clock Back, published in 1933, which had angered Nazi officials to the point where Mowrer's friends believed he faced mortal danger.

The German government openly pressured him to leave the country, with Germany's ambassador to the United States notifying the State Department that because of the "people's righteous indignation" the government could no longer hope to keep Mowrer free from harm. When the Chicago Daily News learned about the threats, Frank Knox, the owner of the newspaper, offered Mowrer a position in the paper's bureau in Tokyo. Mowrer, who did not want to leave Germany, agreed to leave before covering the annual Nazi Party spectacle in Nuremberg set to begin on 1 September 1933. After American diplomatic missions to Germany refused to guarantee his and his family's safety, and after a futile personal appeal to the newly appointed US ambassador to Germany William Dodd, Mowrer agreed to depart immediately, in return for the release of Paul Goldmann, an elderly Jewish correspondent for the Austrian newspaper Neue Freie Presse, who was being held by the Gestapo for high treason.

A Nazi official, assigned to make sure Mowrer actually left Berlin, approached him as he was boarding the train and asked when he was coming back to Germany; Mowrer answered: "Why when I can come back with about two million of my countrymen." Although he'd initially been given a post in Tokyo, upon leaving Berlin he went to Paris and took over as the Paris bureau chief for the Chicago Daily News, continuing to report on European affairs until France's defeat by German forces in 1940. Upon his return to the United States, Mowrer lectured for a time to American audiences, warning them of the burgeoning power of Fascism. Although he had expected to be sent to Tokyo, Mowrer was assigned in January 1934 to replace his brother as chief of the Paris bureau of the Chicago Daily News. From this vantage point, he covered the events that led to the outbreak of World War II, and he acquired a growing distrust of plebiscites and treaties. In 1936, he covered the beginning of the civil war in Spain and visited the Soviet Union to report on the adoption of the new Soviet constitution. Upon his return to France, he witnessed the fall of the Popular Front government headed by his friend Leon Blum. He visited China for a few months in 1938 to gather material for his book The Dragon Wakes. A Report from China (Morrow, 1939) and then returned to Paris, where he remained until the fall of France in June 1940.

Assigned in August 1940 to Washington, D.C. as a correspondent for the Chicago Daily News, Mowrer collaborated with William J. Donovan on a series of articles on fifth-column activities in Europe. Several trips to the Far East in the next two years resulted in the book Global War: An Atlas of World Strategy (McClelland, 1942), which he wrote in cooperation with Marthe Rajchman. From 1941 to 1943, he served as deputy director of the Office of Facts and Figures in the Office of War Information and broadcast news analyses from his post in Washington. In his postwar book The Nightmare of American Foreign Policy (Knopf, 1948) Mowrer criticized the foreign policy of the United States since 1918. He expressed pessimism about the American love of the status quo and warned that the United States must choose between "world leadership and rapid decline." He advocated a voluntary federation, strong enough to keep world order through the enforcement of world law. He maintained that the United Nations, which he described as "an unfinished bridge leading nowhere", was inadequate to undertake this task.

W. Fox, writing in The New York Times (October 31, 1948), called the book "incomparably the best study of American foreign policy for this period that has yet been written." Pursuing his ideas on international organization further in Challenge and Decision: A Program for the Times of Crisis Ahead (McGraw, 1950), Mowrer urged the United States to take the lead in forming a "peace coalition" and the ultimate federation of non-Communist countries, to weaken the "expansionist bloc." M. S. Watson noted in the Saturday Review of Literature (December 9, 1950) that Mowrer's program resembled that of the United World Federalists. In A Good Time to be Alive (Duell, 1959), a collection of articles he wrote for the Saturday Review, Zionist Quarterly, Western World, and the New Leader, Mowrer surveyed the impact of world affairs upon the United States. He suggested that Soviet successes were compelling Western peoples to "pull themselves together in a real effort to survive as free men", and concluded that America's pioneer spirit was "still warm beneath the ashes of self-indulgence." In An End to Make-Believe (Duell, 1961), Mowrer analyzed the history of the Cold War and its meaning to Americans. In it, he contrasted what he called the "fanatical ambition of international Communism with the unshakeable complacency of most Americans", and maintained that in "the sinister game of international poker forced on us by Moscow and Peiping" the West still "holds the aces" but needs "bolder, better players."

Returning to the United States, Mowrer served as the Deputy Director, first of the Office of Facts and Figures, then, after the OFF's consolidation, of the Office of War Information, from 1942 until 1943. Upon his departure, he started his column "Edgar Mowrer on World Affairs", which he later supplemented with a column entitled "What's Your Question on World Affairs?" After the Second World War, Mowrer wrote a number of books and helped organize the Americans for Democratic Action. In 1956, he took over as editor of Western World magazine, a position he held for four years. In 1969, he moved to Wonalancet, New Hampshire and wrote a column for The Union Leader until 1976.

Mowrer was a member of the Citizens Committee for a Free Cuba, set up in 1963.

== Works ==
- This American World. J. H. Sears & Co. 1928.
- Germany Puts The Clock Back. John Lane Company (in US William Morrow and Company). 1933.
- Mowrer in China. Penguin Books (UK). 1938.
- (with Marthe Rajchman) (1942). Global War: An Atlas of World Strategy. William Morrow and Company.
- The Nightmare of American Foreign Policy. Alfred A Knopf. 1948.
- Challenge and Decision; A program for the times of crisis ahead, for world peace under American leadership. McGraw-Hill. 1950.
- A Good Time to be Alive. Duell, Sloan & Pearce. 1959.
- Triumph and Turmoil: A Personal History of our Time. Weybright and Talley. 1968.
- Umano and the Price of Lasting Peace. Philosophical Library. 1972. ISBN 0-8022-2103-3.
