= John Heminway =

American filmmaker and author (born 1944)

- Born: John Hylan Heminway, Jr. 1944 (age 81–82); New York City, U.S.
- Citizenship: United States
- Education: Princeton University (BA)
- Occupations: Filmmaker, author
- Years active: 1968–present
- Employer(s): National Geographic, Anglia Television, PBS
- Known for: In Full Flight, exposés of the illegal ivory trade, conservation efforts

John Hylan Heminway, Jr. (born 1944) is an American filmmaker, author, and conservationist who traveled the globe for his films, photography, and novels, many of which focus on the natural world.

== Early life ==
John Heminway was born in 1944 in New York City to John Hyland Heminway, Sr. and Jane Johnson, where he attended the Buckley School until age 9. He then spent three years at le Rosey in Switzerland and returned to the United States to complete his schooling at St. Mark’s School. He shared his home with one brother, Jay. Heminway graduated from Princeton University with a Bachelor of Arts in 1966. Following his graduation, Heminway made his way to Africa, a continent he loved from his first journey on through the rest of his life. Since 1960, he has returned nearly every year to Africa. After six months in Africa, Heminway met a producer from ABC Sports who read his first book, The Imminent Rains, and invited him to work with a program for the network.

== Film ==
Heminway began his film career in 1968 writing for the ABC program The American Sportsman, a popular sports broadcast that covered “movie stars and celebrated athletes hunting and fishing around the world." During his four years with the program, Heminway learned how to direct and produce as well as write for television and film. He then spent several decades writing, directing, and producing films and television shows.

He worked with a group of wildlife filmmakers called “Survival” under the umbrella of Anglia Television. After several years, he traveled back to the United States, joining PBS to produce a series called The Brain. In 1988, he wrote and produced their sequel series The Mind. Heminway produced the PBS series Travels, where he traveled around the globe, between 1988 and 1993. He also wrote and directed PBS’s Evolution series and National Geographic’s Stress: Portrait of a Killer. He also wrote and co-produced two award-winning films for National Geographic TV, Bones of Turkana and Battle for the Elephants.

Heminway produced and aired the sequel to Battle for the Elephants, Warlord of Ivory, in 2015. Both films focused on drawing public attention to the illegal ivory trade.

== Career in writing ==
Heminway published his first book, The Imminent Rains, in 1968 at the age of 23. The novel tells the story of an overland journey from South Africa to Kenya. Many of his following publications also tell stories about Africa and traveling. Over the course of his career, Heminway published six books.

No Man's Land: A Personal Journey into Africa was published in 1983. It includes stories from Heminway's own experience in Africa. In 1990, African Journeys: A Personal Guidebook was published and reflects Heminway's research on the continent. His 2000 book Yonder documents the history of the Bar 20 ranch in Montana, which Heminway purchased in 1987. One of his more prominent books, In Full Flight, which covers the history of famed "flying doctor" Anne Spoerry and her wartime activities in Nazi Germany, was covered by CNN.

Heminway has also written for a variety of newspapers and magazines, including New York Times, Reader's Digest, Condé Nast Traveler, Travel & Leisure and National Geographic Adventure.

== Work in conservation ==
Heminway served on the boards of Trout Unlimited, White Oak Conservation Center, Tusk USA, Elephant Family USA, the American Prairie Foundation, and the African Wildlife Foundation, where he was chairman for nine years, In May 2013, he became chairman of Wildlife Direct which is devoted to “changing laws and behavior related to wildlife crime in Kenya and elsewhere in Africa.”

== Personal life ==
In 1999, John married Kathryn Wilmerding, and the two had a daughter in 2002.

== Awards and recognition ==
In 2013, Montana State University (MSU) awarded John Heminway the Blue and Gold Award, a university-based award that thanks individuals for their services to Montana and the broader community. In 2016, MSU awarded him an honorary doctorate The International Wildlife Film Festival gave him a Lifetime Achievement Award in 2015 for “his contributions to wildlife filmmaking.

Hemingway earned “two Emmys, [two of] the George F. Peabody Award and Alfred I. DuPont-Columbia University Award for Broadcast Journalism, as well as a Telly, a Ciné Golden Eagle, [and] a Christopher” as well as several awards at the International Wildlife Film festival s. “Battle for the Elephants” won Best Conservation Film at the Jackson Hole Wildlife Film Festival, and “Warlords of Ivory” was honored in a special ceremony at the United Nations.

In 2020, Archives and Special Collections at Montana State University Library received Heminway’s papers.

== Later years ==
Heminway and his family moved to Bozeman, Montana in 2005, where they currently live. He serves as an adjunct lecturer with Montana State University’s School of Film and Photography and supports MSU’s chapter of Engineers Without Borders. He is also a member of the Directors Guild of America, the Writers Guild of America, the Explorers’ Club and the Royal Geographical Society.

== Publications ==
- Heminway, John Hylan. The Imminent Rains; a Visit among the Last Pioneers of Africa. 1st Ed.]. ed. Boston: Little, Brown, 1968.
- Heminway, John Hylan. 1984. No man's land: the last of white Africa. San Diego: Harcourt Brace Jovanovich.
- Heminway, John Hylan. Winold Reiss. S.l.]: Smithsonian Magazine, 1989.
- Heminway, John Hylan. 1990. African journeys: a personal guidebook. New York, NY: Warner Books.
- Heminway, John Hylan. Yonder : A Place in Montana. Washington, D.C.: Adventure Press/National Geographic, 2000.
- Heminway, John Hylan. 2006. Disney magic: the launching of a dream. New York: Disney Editions.
- Heminway, John Hylan. In Full Flight : A Story of Africa and Atonement, 2018.
