= Lorian Hemingway =

American novelist

- Born: Lorian Hemingway; December 15, 1951 (age 74); Jackson, Mississippi
- Citizenship: United States
- Occupations: Author; essayist; journalist
- Parent(s): Gloria Hemingway; Shirley Jane Rhodes
- Relatives: Ernest Hemingway (paternal grandfather); Pauline Pfeiffer (paternal grandmother)
- Writing career
- Genres: Fiction and non-fiction
- Notable works: Walking into the River (1992) Walk on Water, A World Turned Over
- Notable awards: Conch Republic Prize for Literature
- Website: www.shortstorycompetition.com

Lorian Hemingway (born December 15, 1951) is an American author and freelance journalist. Her books include the memoir Walk on Water, the novel Walking Into the River, and the non-fiction book A World Turned Over, about the devastation of South Jackson in her hometown of Jackson, Mississippi, by the Candlestick Park Tornado in 1966. Her articles have appeared in GQ, The New York Times Magazine, Esquire, The Seattle Times, Seattle Post-Intelligencer, and Rolling Stone.

== Career ==
In 1992, Hemingway was nominated for The Mississippi Arts and Letters Award for Fiction for her debut novel Walking Into the River. In 1999 she received The Conch Republic Prize for Literature for her body of work and her dedication to encouraging the talent of new writers.

Her work has been positively reviewed by The New York Times Book Review, The Boston Globe, the San Francisco Chronicle, the Chicago Tribune, The Washington Post and Time, among others. Her numerous nature essays have appeared in several anthologies, including "Uncommon Waters", "The Gift of Trout", "Headwaters", "A Different Angle", "Randy Wayne White's Ultimate Tarpon Guide", and "Growing Up in Mississippi", to quote a few. She is former editor-at-large of Flyfishing & Tying Journal.

In 1981, Hemingway founded the Lorian Hemingway Short Story Competition which is "dedicated to recognizing the voices of writers who have yet to be heard". The competition, which is open to U.S. and international citizens, draws between 800 and 1,200 submissions annually from the United States and around the world.

== Personal life ==
Lorian Hemingway is from Mississippi, the daughter of Gloria Hemingway and Shirley Jane Rhodes, a former Powers model. She grew up in numerous places throughout the South, including Mississippi, Arkansas, and Louisiana. Hemingway is one of 12 grandchildren of American novelist and Nobel Prize-laureate Ernest Hemingway. She claims to be the great-granddaughter of a Cherokee chief on her mother's side. Her maternal grandfather, Henry L. Rhodes, was a farmer in Golddust, Tennessee, and an accomplished guitarist. During the Great Mississippi Flood of 1927, Rhodes played his guitar to his children as the floodwaters rose and eventually engulfed their farmhouse. The family was forced to flee in a rowboat. Hemingway's maternal aunt, Freda Lassiter, an accomplished artist, would later paint scenes of the farmhouse and the flood, a theme that would run through her work throughout her life. Lassiter was a great influence on young Lorian, teaching her that the choices she made in life were hers alone. Lassiter also instilled in Hemingway, by example, a great love of nature and of all animals. Because of this early imprint Hemingway became an advocate of the Feral Cat Project, and actively rescues feral cats.

== Writings ==
=== Books ===
- Hemingway, Lorian (1992). Walking into the River. New York: Simon & Schuster. ISBN 0-671-74642-1
- Hemingway, Lorian (1998). Walk on Water: A Memoir. New York: Simon & Schuster. 250 pp.
- Hemingway, Lorian (2002). A World Turned Over; A Killer Tornado and the Lives It Changed Forever. New York: Simon & Schuster. 244 pp.
