= Gloria Hemingway =

American physician (1931–2001)

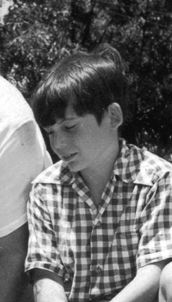
- Hemingway in 1942
- Born: Gregory Hancock Hemingway; November 12, 1931; Kansas City, Missouri, U.S.
- Died: October 1, 2001 (aged 69); Key Biscayne, Florida, U.S.
- Burial place: Ketchum Cemetery; Ketchum, Idaho, U.S.
- Education: University of Miami Medical School (MD)
- Occupations: Physician, writer
- Spouses: Shirley Jane Rhodes (m. 1951; div. 1956) Alice Thomas (m. 1959; div. 1967) Valerie Danby-Smith (m. 1967; div. 1989) Ida Mae Galliher (m. 1992; div. 1995) (m. 1997)
- Children: 8, including Lorian Hemingway and John Hemingway
- Parent(s): Ernest Hemingway; Pauline Pfeiffer
- Relatives: Patrick Hemingway (brother); Jack Hemingway (half-brother)
- Military career
- Allegiance: United States
- Branch: United States Army
- Service years: 1956
- Rank: Private

Gloria Hemingway (born Gregory Hancock Hemingway, November 12, 1931 – October 1, 2001) was an American physician and writer who was the third and youngest child of author Ernest Hemingway. Although she was assigned male at birth and lived most of her life publicly as a man, she struggled with her gender identity from a young age. In her 60s, she underwent gender transition surgery, and preferred the name Gloria.

A good athlete and a crack shot, she trained as a professional hunter in Africa, but her alcoholism prevented her from gaining a license, and later led to the loss of her medical license in the United States. Hemingway maintained a long-running feud with her father, stemming from a 1951 incident when she was arrested for entering a women's bathroom in a Los Angeles movie theater dressed in women's clothing which caused an argument between Ernest and Pauline Pfeiffer, Gloria's mother. Pfeiffer died from a stress-related condition the following day, which Ernest blamed on Gloria.

In 1976, she authored a bestselling memoir of her father, Papa: A Personal Memoir, which was seen by some to reflect troubles of her own. These included wearing women's clothes, which she ascribed to gender dysphoria.

== Early life and education ==
Born in Kansas City, Missouri, to novelist Ernest Hemingway and his second wife Pauline Pfeiffer, she was called 'Gigi' or 'Gig' in childhood and was, according to a close observer, "a tremendous athlete" and a "crack shot". As an adult, she preferred the name 'Greg'. At the age of 12, she was wearing her stepmother Martha Gellhorn's stockings almost daily. Ernest caught her wearing them, and had an outburst of anger that left an impression on her for decades. However, a few days later he said to her, "Gigi, we come from a strange tribe, you and I." Hemingway attended the Canterbury School, a Catholic prep school in Connecticut, graduating in 1949. She dropped out of St. John's College, Annapolis, after one year and worked for a time as an aircraft mechanic before moving to California in 1951.

In April 1951, Hemingway married Jane Rhodes. The two had not known each other long, and Rhodes was pregnant. Ernest objected to 19-year-old Hemingway marrying, because of her financial and mental instability. The same year, Hemingway met with L. Ron Hubbard and was quite taken by Scientology.

In September 1951, Hemingway was arrested for entering a women's bathroom in a Los Angeles movie theater dressed in women's clothing. Her mother, Pauline Pfeiffer, immediately flew out to see her, and took efforts to prevent media picking up the story. Pfeiffer called Ernest in Havana, and the two parents argued, with Hemingway recounting later that Ernest blamed Pauline for Hemingway's nature. According to Hemingway biographer Michael Reynolds the "conversation degenerated into accusations, blame-laying, vituperation, and general misunderstanding." Pfeiffer died of hypertension around 4am the following morning, and both Hemingways would blame the other for her death. During the autopsy it was discovered she suffered from a rare tumor that "secretes abnormal amounts of adrenaline causing extremely high blood pressure." Ernest blamed Hemingway for Pauline's death, and she was deeply disturbed by the accusation. It would be years before she and Ernest spoke to each other again, and their relationship would be tense for the rest of Ernest's life.

Another result was that Hemingway inherited a significant amount of money, which she used in part to retreat to Africa, where she drank alcohol and shot elephants. She spent the next three years in Africa as an apprentice professional hunter but failed to obtain a license because of her drinking. She joined the United States Army as a private in October 1956 and served briefly. She was stationed at Fort Bragg, North Carolina. She was soon institutionalized for bipolar disorder, and received several dozen treatments with electroconvulsive therapy. Of another period shooting elephants she wrote: "I went back to Africa to do more killing. Somehow it was therapeutic." Not until nearly a decade later, in 1960, did she feel strong enough to resume her medical studies and respond to her father's charges. She wrote her father a bitter letter, detailing the medical facts of her mother's death and blaming Ernest for the tragedy. The next year, Ernest killed himself, and again Hemingway wrestled with guilt over the death of a parent.

She obtained a medical degree from the University of Miami Medical School in 1964.

== Career ==
Hemingway practiced medicine in the 1970s and 1980s, first in New York and then as a rural family doctor in Montana, first in Fort Benton and later as the medical officer for Garfield County, based in Jordan, Montana. Much of her medical practice involved health exams for insurance companies. Interviewed there, she said: "When I smell the sagebrush or see the mountains, or a vast clean stream, I love those things. Some of my happiest memories of childhood were associated with the West." In 1988, authorities in Montana declined to renew Hemingway's medical license because of her alcoholism. Hemingway dealt with bipolar disorder, alcoholism, and drug abuse for many years.

Hemingway and her brothers tried to protect their father's name and their inheritance by taking legal action to stop the popular local celebrations called "Hemingway Days" in Key West, Florida. In 1999, they collaborated in creating a business venture, Hemingway Ltd., to market the family name as "an up-scale lifestyle accessory brand". Their first venture created controversy by putting the Hemingway name on a line of shotguns.

== Personal life ==
=== Gender identity ===
Throughout her life, Hemingway experienced gender dysphoria and wore women's clothes often, mostly privately and occasionally going out. When Hemingway was 12 years old, Ernest walked in on her dressed in her stepmother Martha Gellhorn's stockings, a near-daily activity at the time, and went berserk. A biographer of Hemingway's, Donald Junkins, stated that when Hemingway was 60 years old, she told him that "[she] never got over it: the raging wrath of [her] father". However, a few days after the childhood encounter Ernest counseled "Gigi, we come from a strange tribe, you and I." In 1946 Ernest's wife Mary accused the maid of stealing her lingerie, but later discovered the items under 14-year-old Hemingway's mattress. When Ernest rebuked her for stealing from Mary years later, Hemingway responded, "The clothes business is something that I have never been able to control, understand basically very little, and I am terribly ashamed of. I have lied about it before, mainly to people I am fond of, because I was afraid they would not like me as much if they had found out."

Hemingway's wife, Valerie, wrote that Hemingway "fought a losing battle against this crippling illness", faulting Hemingway's parents as "unable or unwilling to accept" what Hemingway herself could not "come to terms with it ... for a long time, taking up the study of medicine in the hope that [she] would find a cure, or at least a solace." Valerie described "an alternate persona, a character into which [Hemingway] could retreat from the unbearable responsibilities of being, among other things, his father's son [sic], and of never ever measuring up to" others' expectations and Hemingway's own.

Hemingway considered gender-affirming surgery as early as 1973. She tried conversion therapy to no avail. In a 1986 interview with The Washington Post, Hemingway stated "I've spent hundreds of thousands of dollars trying not to be a transvestite." Meyer's 2020 biography noted that "despite psychiatric help and shock treatments...[Hemingway]...remained an obsessive transvestite." She had bottom surgery in 1994 and began using the name Gloria, or sometimes Vanessa, her daughter's name. Hemingway remarried, to Ida Mae Galliher, in 1997 in Washington state, presenting as male since same-sex marriage in Washington was illegal at the time.

While she was sometimes open with the media about her struggles with gender dysphoria and had been seen in women's clothing numerous times, Hemingway's public persona generally remained male, as she never gained the acceptance of her family or society, and repeatedly attempted conversion therapy. Using the name Gregory, she gave interviews about her father as late as 1999. In July of that year she attended events marking the centenary of Ernest Hemingway's birth in Oak Park, Illinois. She also spoke at the dedication of the Hemingway-Pfeiffer Museum in her mother's family home in Piggott, Arkansas, when it opened on July 4, 1999.

In addition to bottom surgery, Hemingway had breast implant surgery on one breast and then had it reversed; the autopsy and police report both noted the presence of breasts. She was increasingly seen in women's attire in public; yet, she also frequented a local tavern dressed as a man, presented as what a patron called "just one of the guys", though they knew about her feminine identity and persona and were not bothered.

On September 24, 2001, Hemingway wore a black cocktail dress to a party and used the name Vanessa; she did not become drunk and was regarded as noticeably happy by friends, many who had never been introduced to her as a woman before. Hemingway also stated that her gender-affirming surgery was the best thing she had ever done. The next day, Hemingway was arrested for indecent exposure and resisting arrest after walking nude in Key Biscayne. She first gave the police the name Greg Hemingway, then changed it to Gloria and was detained in the Miami-Dade Women's Detention Center, where she died five days later.

== Relationship with Ernest Hemingway ==
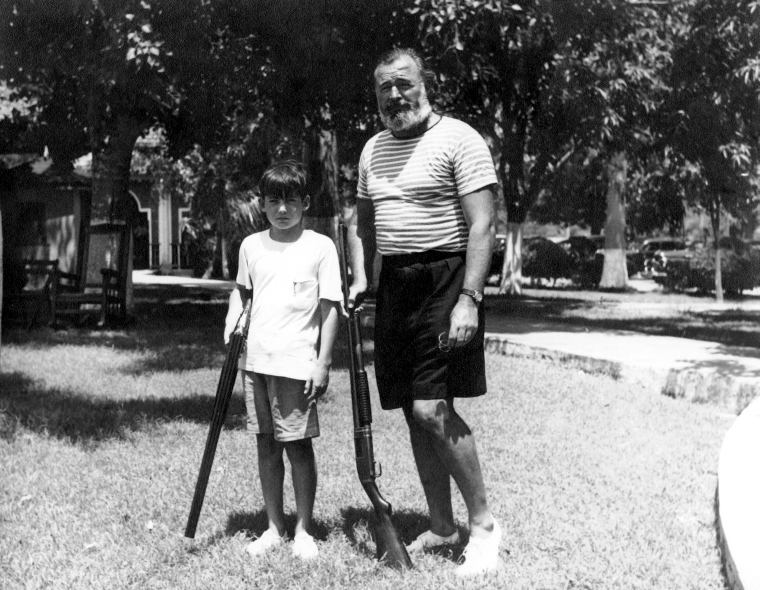
Gloria Hemingway and her father, Ernest Hemingway, shooting live pigeons at the Club de Cazadores in Cuba about 1943

In addition to the conflict over him finding her in Martha Gellhorn's clothing, Ernest and his child were estranged for many years, beginning when she was 19 and arrested for entering a women's bathroom in women's clothes. Ernest blamed Pauline, and the enormous stress triggered an underlying condition and caused her death, which he then blamed on his daughter. Ernest also said Gloria had "the biggest dark side in the family except me". As an attempt at reconciliation, Hemingway sent her father a telegram in October 1954 to congratulate him on being awarded the Nobel Prize and received $5,000 in return. They had intermittent contact thereafter.

One such example was a letter from Hemingway to Ernest in reply to one which referenced her gender exploration stating "The clothes business is something that I have never been able to control, understand basically very little, and I am terribly ashamed of. I have lied about it before, mainly to people I am fond of, because I was afraid they would not like me as much if they had found out."

Hemingway wrote a short account of her father's life and their strained relationship, Papa: A Personal Memoir, that became a bestseller. When it appeared in 1976, Norman Mailer wrote in the preface, "There is nothing slavish here....For once, you can read a book about [Ernest] Hemingway and not have to decide whether you like him or not." The New York Times called it "a small miracle" and "artfully elliptical" in presenting "gloriously romantic adventures" with "a thin cutting edge of malice". Hemingway wrote of her own ambitions in the shadow of her father's fame: "What I really wanted to be was a Hemingway hero." Of her father she wrote: "The man I remembered was kind, gentle, elemental in his vastness, tormented beyond endurance, and although we always called him papa, it was out of love, not fear." She quoted her father as telling her: "You make your own luck, Gig" and "You know what makes a good loser? Practice." Time magazine criticized the author's "churlishness" and called her work "a bitter jumble of unsorted resentments and anguished love." Her daughter Lorian responded to Papa with a letter to Time that said, "I would also like to know what type of person the author is ... I haven't seen [her] for eight years ... I think it sad that I learn more about [her] by reading articles and gossip columns than from my own communication".

According to her wife Valerie, Hemingway enjoyed her father's portrayal of her as Andrew in Islands in the Stream (1970) and later used the text as the epigraph to her memoir of her father. Valerie included this text as the epigraph to her own tribute to Hemingway written two years after her death:

The smallest boy was fair and was built like a pocket battle-ship. He was a Copy of Thomas Hudson, physically, reduced in scale and widened and shortened. His skin freckled when it tanned and he had a humorous face and was born being very old. He was a devil too, and deviled both his older brothers, and he had a dark side to him that nobody except Thomas Hudson could ever understand. Neither of them thought about this except that they recognized it in each other and knew it was bad and the man respected it and understood the boy's having it. They were very close to each other although Thomas Hudson had never been as much with this boy as with the others. This youngest boy, Andrew, was a precocious excellent athlete and he had been marvelous with horses since he had first ridden. The other boys were very proud of him but they did not want any nonsense from him, either. He was a little unbelievable and anyone could well have doubted his feats except that many people had seen him ride and watched him jump and seen his cold, professional modesty. He was a boy born to be quite wicked who was being very good and he carried his wickedness around with him transmuted into a sort of teasing gaiety. But he was a bad boy and the others knew it and he knew it. He was just being good while his badness grew inside him.

In the course of her first three marriages, Hemingway had eight children including Vanessa, John, and Lorian. One of her marriages, to Valerie Danby-Smith, Ernest's secretary, lasted almost 20 years. Hemingway's fourth marriage, to Ida Mae Galliher, ended in divorce in 1995 after three years, though they continued to live together and remarried in 1997.

== Death ==
Hemingway died on October 1, 2001, of hypertension and cardiovascular disease in Miami-Dade Women's Detention Center. That day, Hemingway was due in court to answer charges of indecent exposure and resisting arrest without violence. Hemingway had been living in Florida for more than ten years. She is interred next to her father and her half-brother Jack in the cemetery in Ketchum, Idaho.

== Public reactions to death ==
In most obituaries, she was called "Gregory", but Time magazine published a brief notice of the death of "Gloria Hemingway, 69, transsexual youngest son turned daughter of novelist Ernest Hemingway" and noted the novelist once said Hemingway had "the biggest dark side in the family except me". The gravestone reads: "Dr. Gregory Hancock Hemingway 1931–2001".

Activists responded to media coverage of Hemingway's death as transphobic. Shortly after Hemingway died, the LGBT magazine The Advocate published an article discussing the coverage of her death. In it, Vanessa Edwards Foster, spokeswoman for the National Transgender Advocacy Coalition, discussed how family rejection contributes to depression, how Hemingway had to fight for years to be recognized, especially growing up as Ernest's son, and how transgender people felt the coverage was lurid, degrading, and dehumanizing. Hemingway's daughter Lorian sympathized, and stated "I am proud of [her] for going through with it" and that she hoped it brought Hemingway "some peace in the years [she] had left". She said that it was good that Hemingway's life ended "in the women's cell, where [she] would have chosen to be."

She left two wills. One will left most of the $7 million estate to Galliher. The other left most of it to Hemingway's children. The children challenged the will that named Galliher as heir, claiming that Galliher was not legally Hemingway's widow given that Hemingway's home state of Florida did not recognize same-sex marriages. The parties eventually reached an undisclosed settlement.

In 1972, Maia Rodman, Hemingway's childhood tennis coach and a family friend who had fallen in love with her, dedicated her book The Life and Death of a Brave Bull to Hemingway.

Hemingway's daughter Lorian Hemingway wrote about Hemingway in the 1999 book Walk on Water: A Memoir. Hemingway's son Edward, an author and artist, has written or illustrated 11 books, including the children's books Bad Apple, Tough Cookie, and Pigeon and Cat. Her son John wrote the memoir Strange Tribe: A Family Memoir.
