= Margaux Hemingway =

American fashion model and actress (1954–1996)

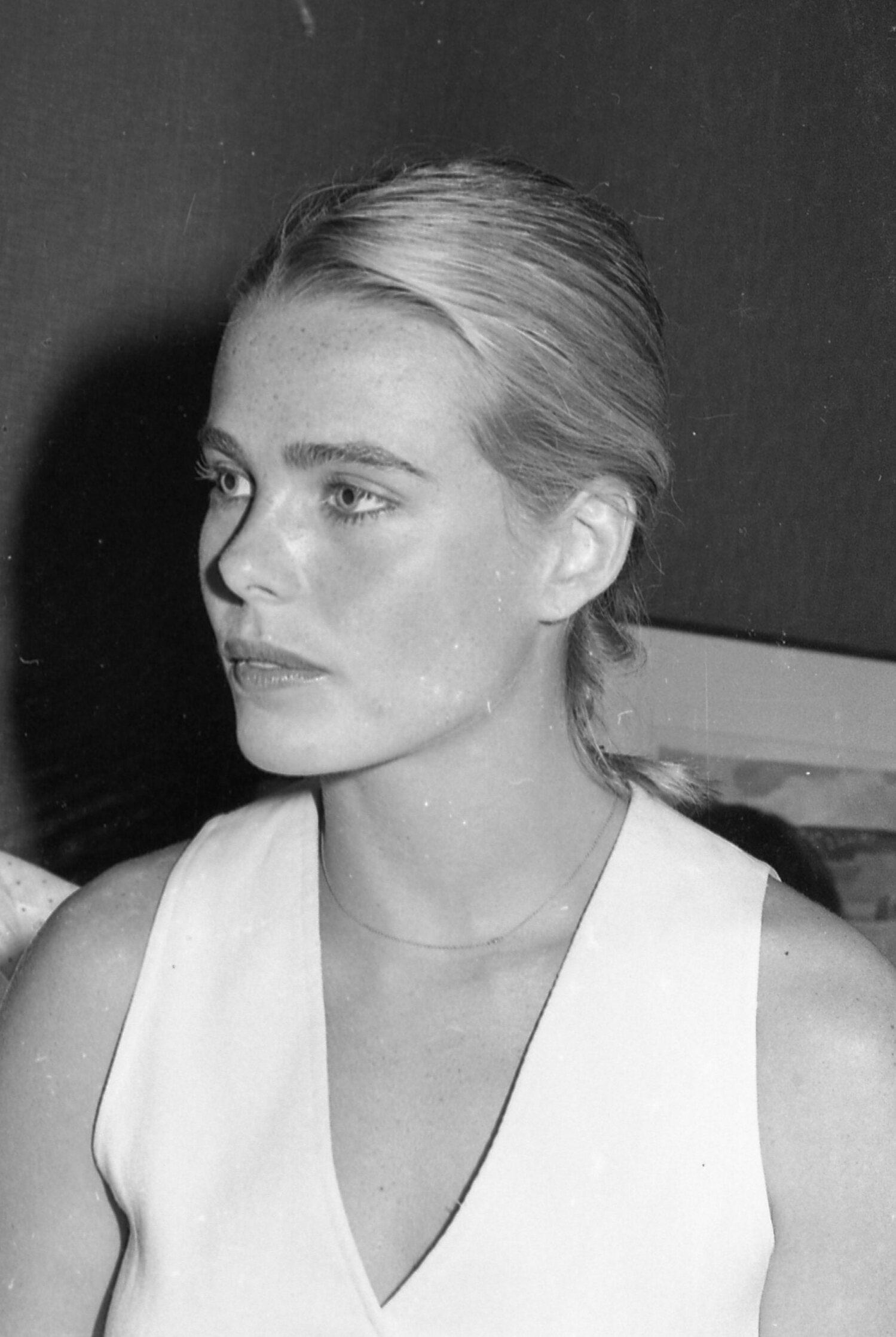
- Hemingway in 1976
- Born: Margot Louise Hemingway; February 16, 1954; Portland, Oregon, U.S.
- Died: July 1, 1996 (aged 42); Santa Monica, California, U.S.
- Resting place: Ketchum Cemetery, Ketchum, Idaho, U.S. 43.686806°N 114.366668°W
- Occupations: Model; actress
- Years active: 1972–1996
- Height: 6 ft 0 in (1.83 m)
- Spouses: Erroll Wetanson (m. 1975; div. 1978) Bernard Faucher (m. 1979; div. 1985)
- Father: Jack Hemingway
- Relatives: Mariel Hemingway (sister); Ernest Hemingway (paternal grandfather); Hadley Richardson (paternal grandmother)

Margaux Louise Hemingway (born Margot Louise Hemingway; February 16, 1954 – July 1, 1996) (Note: Hemingway's date of birth appears in her California death record, where she is named as Margot Louise Hemingway, born in the state of Oregon. The birthdate given by The New York Times—February 19, 1955—is incorrect. Hemingway's body was badly decomposed and her precise date of death is not known. Some sources suggest June 28 or June 29, 1996. For official purposes, however, California records her date of death as July 1, 1996, the date on which her body was discovered.) was an American fashion model and actress. The granddaughter of writer Ernest Hemingway, she gained independent fame as a supermodel in the 1970s, appearing on the covers of magazines including Cosmopolitan, Elle, Harper's Bazaar, Vogue, and Time.

She signed a million-dollar contract with Fabergé Inc. as the spokesmodel for Babe perfume. In addition to her modeling career, Hemingway occasionally worked as an actress, making her feature film debut in the rape and revenge thriller Lipstick (1976). Other film roles include the comedies They Call Me Bruce? (1982) and Over the Brooklyn Bridge (1984).

Her later years were marred by highly publicized episodes of addiction and depression, before her suicide from a drug overdose around July 1, 1996, at the age of 42.

== Early life ==
Margot Louise Hemingway was born February 16, 1954, in Portland, Oregon, the second of three daughters born to Byra Louise "Puck" (née Whittlesey) and Jack Hemingway (eldest child of writer Ernest Hemingway). When she learned that she was named after the wine Château Margaux, which her parents drank on the night she was conceived, she changed the spelling from "Margot" to "Margaux" to match. She had two sisters, actress Mariel Hemingway and Joan (nicknamed Muffet).

During her childhood, the family moved from Oregon to Cuba, where her grandfather had lived, then to San Francisco, and later to Idaho, where they lived on her grandfather's farm in Ketchum, adjacent to Sun Valley. The family took trips each summer back to Oregon with the daughters' godmother, who owned a farm in Salem. She attended the Catlin Gabel School in Portland for her junior year.

Margaux struggled with several disorders beginning in her teenage years, including alcoholism, depression, bulimia, and epilepsy. She experienced her first epileptic seizure at eight years old. With her permission, a video recording was made of her therapy session related to her bulimia, and it was broadcast on television. She also had dyslexia. In the 1990s, Margaux reported that she had been sexually abused by her father as a child. In 2013, her younger sister Mariel said in the documentary Running from Crazy that both Margaux and their older sister Muffet had been sexually abused by their father.

== Career ==
=== 1972–1975: Modeling ===
Hemingway was 6 feet (1.8 m) tall and had success as a model, including her million-dollar contract with Fabergé as the spokesmodel for Babe perfume in the 1970s. This was the first million-dollar contract ever awarded to a fashion model. She also appeared on the covers of Cosmopolitan, Elle, Harper's Bazaar, and Vogue, as well as on the June 16, 1975, cover of TIME, which dubbed her one of the "new beauties". The September 1, 1975, cover issue of Vogue called Hemingway "New York's New Supermodel".

Hemingway's quick rise in the modeling industry, coupled with the public's curiosity with her Hemingway family connection, garnered her the "it girl" label amongst the press and in social circles.

During the height of her modeling career in the mid- to late 1970s, Hemingway was a regular attendee of New York City's exclusive discothèque Studio 54, often in the company of such celebrities as Halston, Bianca Jagger, Liza Minnelli, Grace Jones, and Andy Warhol. At such social mixers, she began to use alcohol and drugs.

=== 1976–1998: Film & TV career ===
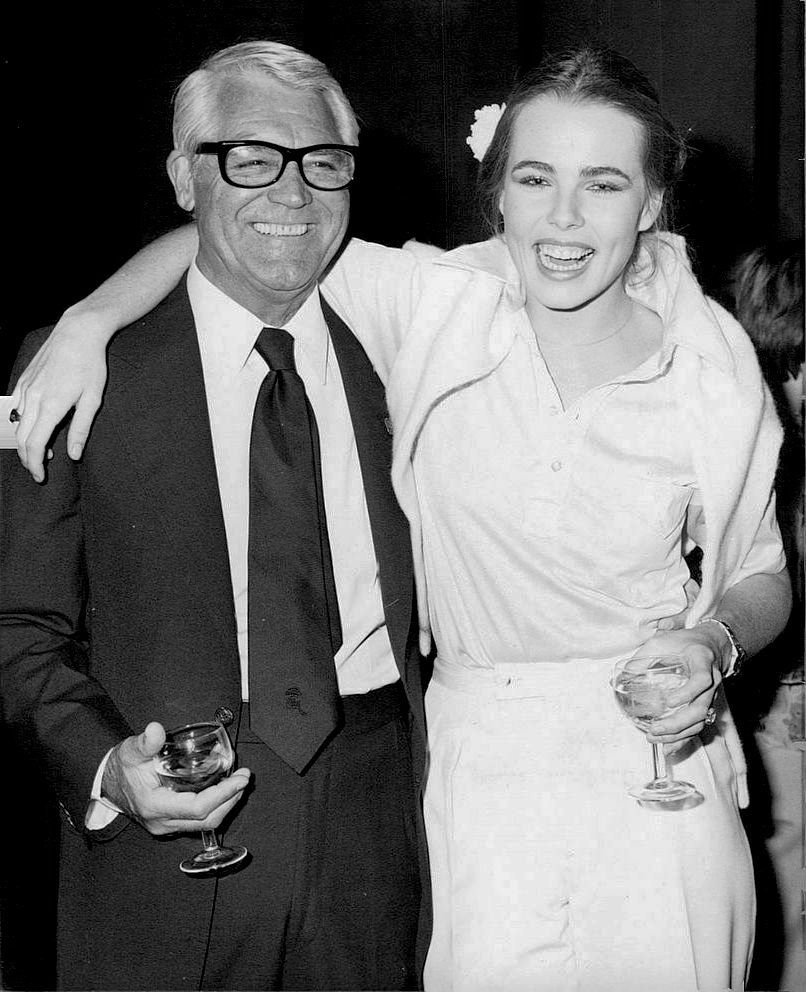
Cary Grant and Margaux Hemingway, 1976

Over the course of her career, Hemingway appeared on dozens of talk and game shows and, in 1976, was a presenter at the 48th Academy Awards. With her father, she also starred in two fishing episodes (1979 and 1981) of The American Sportsman.

She made her film debut in the Lamont Johnson-directed rape and revenge film Lipstick (1976), alongside her 14-year-old sister Mariel, and Anne Bancroft. In it, she plays a fashion model who is terrorized by a rapist. The film's violent depiction of rape led it to be labeled an exploitation film, though in later years it had success as a cult film.

She followed this with a supporting role in the Italian horror film Killer Fish (1979), opposite Lee Majors and Karen Black. Her following project was the comedy They Call Me Bruce? in 1982. In 1984, Hemingway had a supporting part in Over the Brooklyn Bridge, opposite Elliott Gould and Shelley Winters. After a skiing accident in 1984, Hemingway gained 75 pounds (34 kg), ending up at nearly 200 lb (91 kg), and became increasingly depressed. In 1987, she checked into the Betty Ford Center.

Attempting to make a comeback, she appeared on the cover of Playboy in May 1990, asking the magazine to hire spiritist Zachary Selig as the creative director for her story. It was shot in Belize, by photographer Arny Freytag. That was followed by several B-movies, including Killing Machine (1984) and Inner Sanctum (1991).

Hemingway continued to act in a string of direct-to-video films and, in 1998, was the subject of the documentary Hemingway: Winner Take Nothing, in which she explored the life of her grandfather to identify parallels between his self-destructive tendencies and her own struggles. Shortly before her death, she was set to host the outdoor adventure series Wild Guide on the Discovery Channel.

== Personal life ==
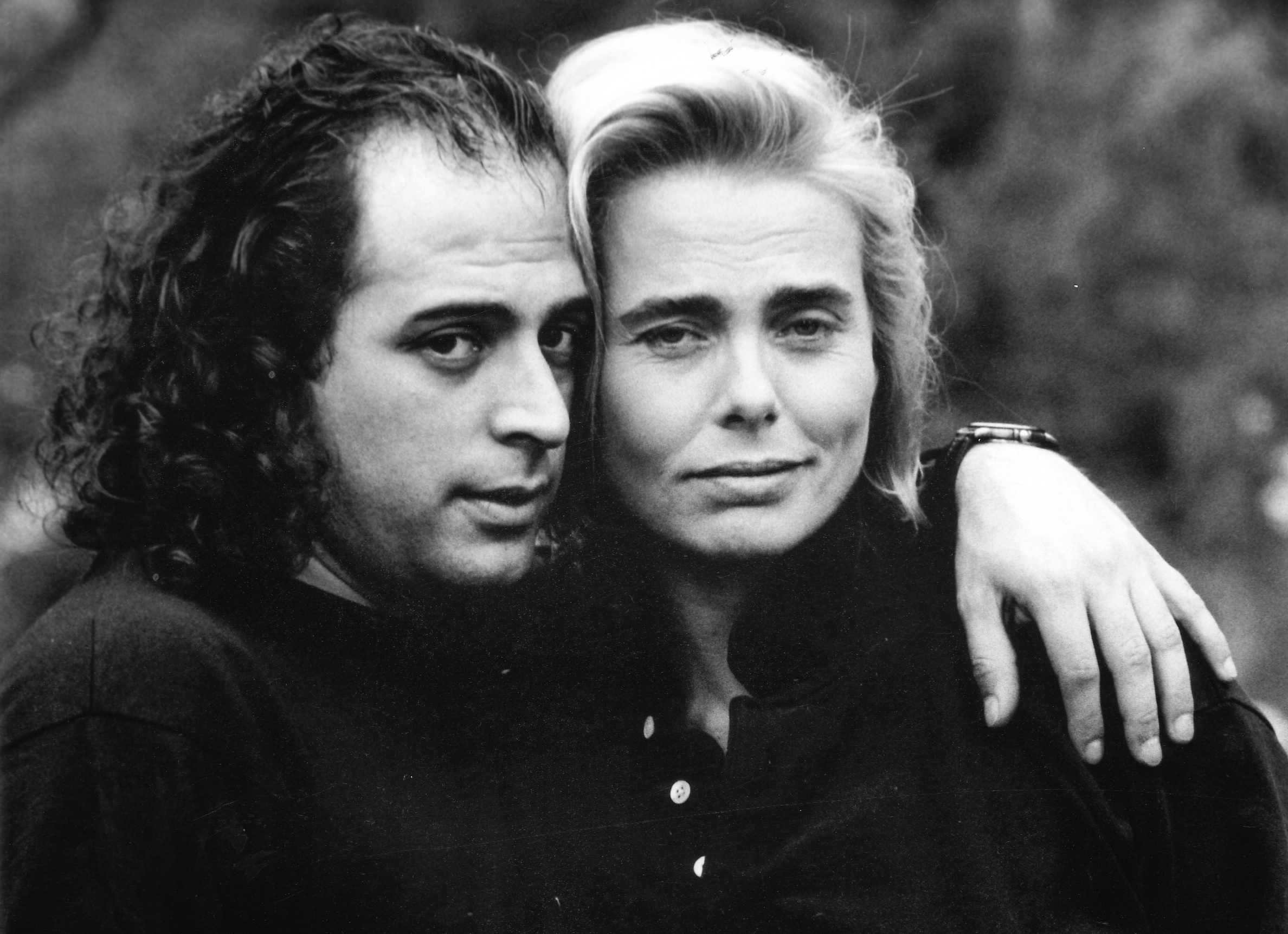
Hemingway with Eduardo Montes-Bradley in 1991

In June 1975, Hemingway married entrepreneur Errol Wetson (Wetanson). They divorced in 1978.

On New Year's Eve 1979, Hemingway married French filmmaker Bernard Faucher. They divorced in 1985.

Hemingway had strained relationships with members of her family. She had a tense relationship with her mother, though they reconciled prior to Byra's death from cancer in 1988. She also competed with her younger sister Mariel, who received greater accolades for her acting. In the 1990s, Hemingway alleged that her father, Jack, had molested her as a child. Her father and stepmother, Angela, resented the allegations and stopped speaking to her. Angela told People magazine, "Jack and I did not talk to her for two years. She constantly lies. The whole family won't have anything to do with her. She's nothing but an angry woman."

A 2013 television documentary film Running from Crazy, in which Margaux's sister Mariel speaks of the Hemingway family history of alcoholism, drug addiction, molestation and suicide, contains clips filmed by Margaux.

== Death ==
On July 1, 1996, Hemingway was found dead in her studio apartment in Santa Monica by her friend, Judy Stabile. Stabile and several friends of Hemingway had grown concerned after she failed to answer phone calls during the weekend. Her body was badly decomposed, and the precise date of death could not be determined. The autopsy report and California death records therefore list July 1 as her date of death. According to the Los Angeles County coroner's toxicology report, she had taken an overdose of phenobarbital.

Hemingway was interred at the Hemingway family plot at Ketchum Cemetery in Ketchum, Idaho.

Mariel Hemingway's husband told People in 1996 that, "This [year] was the best I'd seen [Margaux] in years. She had gotten herself back together", Her family had difficulty accepting the fact of her suicide, but on a December 2005 episode of Larry King Live, Mariel said she accepted it.

== Filmography ==
Year	Title	Role	Notes	Ref.
1976	Lipstick	Chris McCormick		
1979	Killer Fish	Gabrielle	Alternative title: Naked Sun	
1982	They Call Me Bruce?	Karmen		
1984	Over the Brooklyn Bridge	Elizabeth		
1984	Killing Machine	Jacqueline	Alternative title: Goma-2	
1987	Gila and Rik	Caterina	Television film	
1987	Portami la luna	Lynn	Television film	
1990	La messe en si mineur	Sophie		
1991	Inner Sanctum	Anna Rawlins		
1992	La donna di una sera	Ellen Foster	US title: A Woman's Secret	
1992	Bad Love	Jackie		
1992	Double Obsession	Heather Dwyer		
1993	Deadly Rivals	Agent Linda Howerton	Credited as Margot Hemingway	
1994	Inner Sanctum II	Anna Rawlins		
1994	Frame-Up II: The Cover-Up		Alternative title: Deadly Conspiracy	
1995	Vicious Kiss	Lisa		
1995	A comme acteur		Short film	
1996	Dangerous Cargo	Julie		
1996	Backroads to Vegas	Katherine	Television film	
1998	Hemingway: Winner Take Nothing	Herself	Documentary; posthumously released	

== Sources ==
- Scavullo, Francesco (1997). Scavullo: Photographs, 50 Years. New York City, New York: Abrams. ISBN 978-0-810-94180-9.
