= Dree Hemingway =

American model and actress

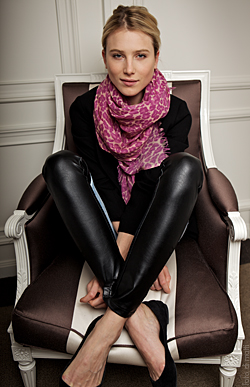
- Hemingway in 2009
- Born: Dree Louise Crisman Hemingway; December 4, 1987 (age 38); Sun Valley, Idaho, U.S.
- Education: Oaks Christian High School
- Occupations: Model; actress
- Years active: 2009–present
- Known for: Starlet; While We're Young; Live Cargo
- Parent(s): Stephen Crisman and Mariel Hemingway
- Relatives: Langley Fox (sister); Ernest Hemingway (great-grandfather); Hadley Richardson (great-grandmother); Grace Hall Hemingway (maternal great-great grandmother)
- Modelling information
- Height: 5 ft 9 in (1.75 m)
- Hair colour: Blonde
- Eye colour: Blue
- Agency: DNA Model Management (New York); VIVA Model Management (Paris, London, Barcelona); Core Artist Management (Hamburg); Priscilla's Model Management (Sydney)

Dree Louise Crisman Hemingway (born December 4, 1987) is an American fashion model and actress. She gained attention playing the lead in American director Sean Baker's feature Starlet (2012). She has since become known for her high-profile fashion campaigns and her work in independent film.

== Early life and education ==
Dree Louise Crisman Hemingway was born in Sun Valley, Idaho. She is the daughter of actress Mariel Hemingway and Stephen Crisman as well as the niece of the late model and actress Margaux Hemingway, who died by suicide when Dree was 8 years old. Author Ernest Hemingway is her great-grandfather on her mother's side. She has a younger sister named Langley Fox.

She grew up in Ketchum, Idaho and attended Ernest Hemingway Elementary School. She later moved to California and lived in Westlake Village. She attended Oaks Christian High School for two and a half years and then dropped out to pursue her modelling career. She was presented as a debutante at the Bal des débutantes in Paris, France in 2003.

== Modeling career ==
In March 2009, Hemingway debuted at the fall/winter 09–10 catwalk show for Givenchy in Paris. In June 2009, she walked in the Calvin Klein resort show in New York. In September 2009, she opened the Topshop spring/summer 2010 show in London.

In January 2010, she became the new face of the Gianfranco Ferré advertising campaign. Later that year, she fronted a new advertising campaign for the Salvatore Ferragamo perfume Attimo. She was photographed by Bryan Adams for the spring 2011 issue of Zoo Magazine.

Hemingway has also walked for Shiatzy Chen, House of Holland, Karl Lagerfeld, Giles, Chanel, and Rue du Mail shows. She has also done campaigns for Gucci, Jean Paul Gaultier, Valentino, H&M, Chanel, Paco Rabanne, and A.Y. Not Dead. She has also done covers and editorials for Harper's Bazaar, i-D, V, W, Numéro, and multiple national editions of Vogue.

In January 2014, Hemingway was the first significant Instagram plug for a crochet bikini created in Brazil but claimed by a Turkish entrepreneur and branded as a "kiini".

Hemingway appeared as the Playboy Playmate in the March 2016 issue of Playboy, which was the first issue to not feature nudity, making her a second-generation Playboy model.

== Acting career ==
Hemingway followed in her mother and aunt's footsteps by launching her acting career. She has appeared predominantly in independent films. Her first lead role was in the independent film Starlet (2012), directed by Sean Baker. She, along with the rest of the ensemble cast, was awarded the Robert Altman Award for the film at the 2012 Independent Spirit Awards. She has had supporting roles in films such as Listen Up Philip (2014) and While We're Young (2014) and leading roles in The People Garden and Live Cargo, the latter of which premiered at the 2016 Tribeca Film Festival.

In 2017, Hemingway appeared in Michelle Morgan's It Happened in L.A., which premiered at the 2017 Sundance Film Festival, as well as Russell Harbaugh's Love After Love, which premiered at the 2017 Tribeca Film Festival.

| Amberleigh West | Kristy Garett | Dree Hemingway | Camille Rowe | Brook Power | Josie Canseco |
| Ali Michael | Valerie van der Graaf | Kelly Gale | Allie Silva | Ashley Smith | Enikő Mihalik |
