= Ralph Hemingway =

English cricketer

Ralph Eustace Hemingway (15 December 1877 – 15 October 1915) was an English first-class cricketer active 1903–14 who played for Nottinghamshire. He was born in Macclesfield and was killed in France on active service during World War I.
