= John Hemingway =

Canadian-American author (born 1960)

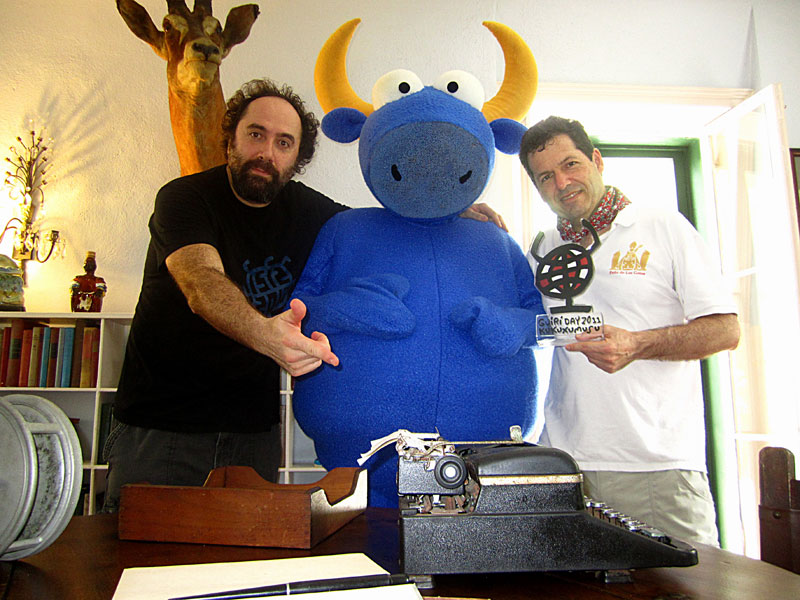
- Hemingway (right) in 2011
- Born: John Patrick Hemingway; August 19, 1960 (age 66)
- Occupation: Author
- Parent(s): Gloria Hemingway; Alice Thomas
- Relatives: Ernest Hemingway (paternal grandfather); Pauline Pfeiffer (paternal grandmother)

John Patrick Hemingway (born August 19, 1960) is a Canadian-American author, whose memoir Strange Tribe: A Family Memoir examines the similarities and the complex relationship between his parent Gloria Hemingway and his grandfather, Ernest Hemingway; in particular it addresses the issue of the gender identity of Gloria, who was a trans woman.

Hemingway moved to Milan, Italy in 1983, where he pursued a writing and translating career. His articles have appeared in several Italian newspapers such as l'Unità and Libero, and in American magazines and literary journals.

He has published the novel Bacchanalia: A Pamplona Story, inspired by his visits to the San Fermín festival, and has also prefaced the book Hemingway in Pamplona, by Miguel Izu.

== Personal life ==
As revealed in his memoir, Strange Tribe, Hemingway had a difficult childhood. His parents suffered from mental illness, Gloria with bipolar disorder and his mother, Alice Thomas, with schizophrenia. Hemingway spent his early years being shuffled from one home to another and dealing with his dysfunctional family. He eventually went to study history and Italian at U.C.L.A. and after graduating moved to Italy, as a way of distancing himself from his troubled family background. One of the unresolved questions for him was how Gloria, a trans woman, could fit with the image that the public has of his grandfather as an icon of male masculinity.

After leaving Italy and spending a year in Spain and three months in the Medoc in France, Hemingway live with his wife, Kristina, and daughter in Montreal, Quebec, Canada, and in Florida. He and Kristina divorced in 2025.
