= Jack Hemingway =

American writer, son of Ernest Hemingway

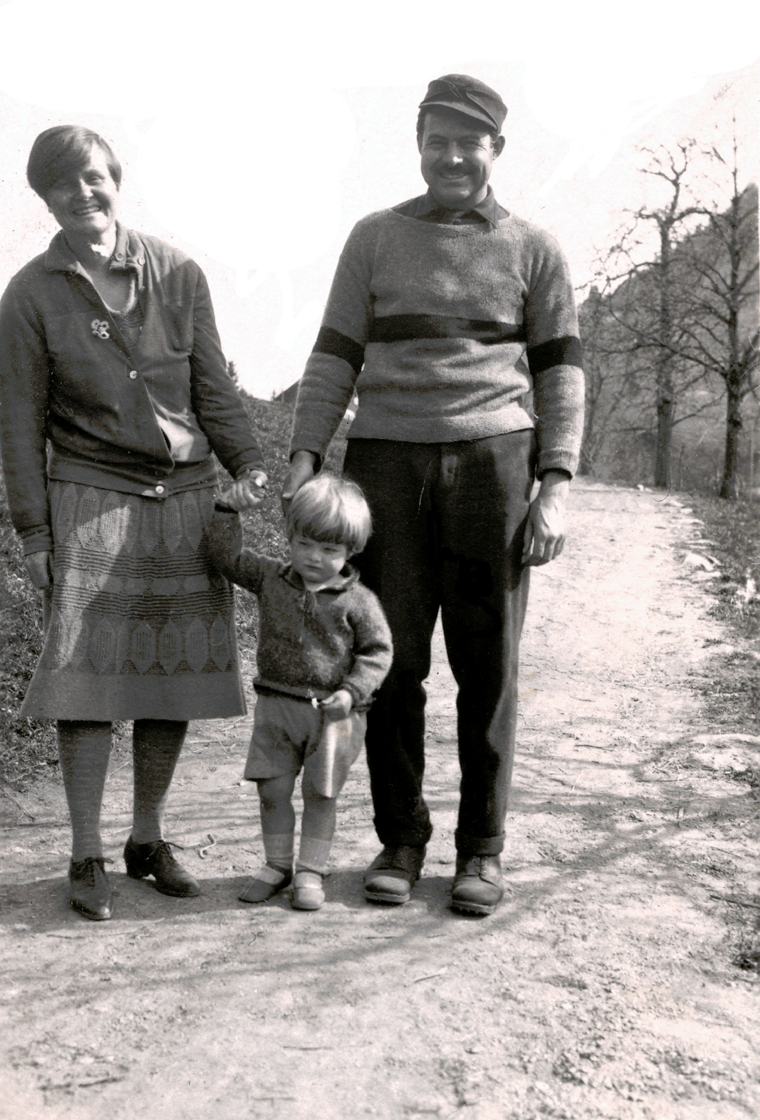
- Hemingway with his parents in 1926
- Born: John Hadley Nicanor Hemingway; October 10, 1923; Toronto, Ontario, Canada
- Died: December 1, 2000 (aged 77); New York City, U.S.
- Resting place: Ketchum Cemetery; Ketchum, Idaho, U.S.
- Citizenship: United States
- Education: University of Montana Dartmouth College
- Occupations: Angler, conservationist, writer
- Known for: Oldest son of Ernest Hemingway
- Spouses: Byra Louise Whittlesey (m. 1949; died 1988) Angela Holvey (m. 1989)
- Children: 3, including Margaux and Mariel Hemingway
- Parent(s): Ernest Hemingway; Hadley Richardson Hemingway
- Relatives: Patrick Hemingway (paternal half-brother); Gloria Hemingway (paternal half-sister)
- Military career
- Allegiance: United States
- Branch: U.S. Army
- Service years: 1941–1945
- Rank: Lieutenant
- Units: Military police, OSS
- Conflicts: World War II; North Africa, occupied France; prisoner of war

John Hadley Nicanor Hemingway (October 10, 1923 – December 1, 2000) was the Canadian-American son of American novelist Ernest Hemingway. He was a conservationist and wrote two books on fly fishing.

== Early life ==
Jack Hemingway was born in Toronto, Ontario, Canada, the only child of American writer Ernest Hemingway and his first wife Hadley Richardson. He had two half-siblings, Patrick and Gloria Hemingway, from Hemingway's marriage to Pauline Pfeiffer.

Throughout his life, Jack was considered by many to bear a strong physical resemblance to his father, but was more like his mother in temperament: "good-natured and even-tempered, and not particularly driven". He was named for his mother, and for the Spanish matador Nicanor Villalta y Serrés, whom his father admired. Gertrude Stein and Alice B. Toklas were his godparents. Nicknamed Bumby as a toddler by his mother "because of his plump teddy-bear qualities", he spent his early years in Paris and the Austrian Alps, and spoke French throughout his life.

== College, military service, early postwar career ==
Hemingway attended the University of Montana and Dartmouth College, but never graduated, instead enlisting in the U.S. Army after the attack on Pearl Harbor in 1941. Known for his sense of humor, in late 1943 at Camp Shanks near Orangeburg, New York, he overheard two older men (one of whom he recognized) in a bar arguing over who was the better writer, Ernest Hemingway or William Faulkner. Jack interrupted, and said in his opinion, there was "a writer that was a better storyteller than either Hemingway or Faulkner – Maurice Walsh." One of the men said, "I am Maurice Walsh," to which Hemingway responded, "I'm Jack Hemingway ... pleased to meet you."

Assigned overseas to France in 1944, he started as a military police officer commanding a special unit of black soldiers, and later obtained a transfer into the Office of Strategic Services (OSS), the newly formed U.S. wartime intelligence agency that evolved into the CIA after the war. As a French-speaking First Lieutenant with the OSS, he worked with the French Resistance. Characteristic of his sense of daring, he parachuted into occupied France with his fly rod, reel and flies, and was almost captured by a German patrol while fishing after his first mission. While on a leave in Algiers, he met with his father's third wife, Martha Gellhorn, whom Jack called his "favorite other mother", who was on her way to Italy to work as a war correspondent with the French Forces.

In France in late October 1944, Hemingway was wounded and captured by the Germans behind enemy lines in the Vosges, and was held as a POW at Moosburg Prison Camp until April 1945. While a POW, he lost 70 lb (32 kg), dropping from 210 to 140 lb (95 to 64 kg). Upon his release, he was flown to Paris in time to join the crowds celebrating VE-Day on May 8, 1945, in the Champs Elysees so beloved by his parents, and he was awarded the Croix de Guerre by the government of France for his wartime service.

After the war, he was stationed briefly in West Berlin and Freiburg im Breisgau in Germany, and at Fort Bragg, North Carolina, before leaving the army. After his discharge, and back in civilian life, he worked as a stockbroker, and then as a fishing supplies salesman. In 1967, he retired and returned to live in Ketchum, Idaho, his father's last home and burial place. There he taught languages, pursued his passion for fly fishing, and wrote two autobiographical books.

== Marriage and family ==
Hemingway married Byra Louise "Puck" Whittlesey on June 25, 1949, in Paris. Their wedding was attended by Julia Child and Alice B. Toklas. The couple had three daughters: Joan Whittlesey "Muffet" Hemingway (Note: Joan Hemingway, born in Paris in 1950 (as Joan Whittlesey Hemingway) was educated at the Sorbonne, and is an actress and writer, known for her novel Rosebud (1974) co-written with Paul Bonnecarrère, which was also adapted into a film by the same name, Rosebud (1975).) (born 1950), Margot Louise Hemingway later known as Margaux Hemingway (1954–1996), and Mariel Hadley Hemingway (born 1961).

Puck died of cancer in 1988. In 1989, Hemingway married Angela Holvey; they remained married until his death in 2000.

=== Sexual abuse allegations ===
In the 1990s, Margaux accused her father of molesting her as a child, an allegation he denied. She later died of a barbiturate overdose in 1996 at age 42. In a 2013 television documentary film Running from Crazy, Mariel backed up her sister's allegation of being molested by Jack, stating that he sexually abused both of her two older sisters in childhood, and that she had been forced to watch him sexually abuse Margaux. (Note: She states in the documentary: "When I was really small, and I shared a room with Margaux, and my dad came in the room, you know... I don't wanna call it what it was, but it wasn't right, you know... um, it's hard to have a visual of that, you don't wanna see your dad doing those things, but I know it, I know it happened. I think that my dad abused the girls [Margaux and Joan], sexually abused the girls, um, when they were young. My dad, if you met him, was not, you don't think 'oh, pedophile', or this or that, you just didn't, that's not what came to your mind at all, at all, he was a beautiful man and in many ways, but I think it happened in drunk, you know, behavior, you know 'my wife doesn't love me', I don't know what the reasons were. You know 'I'm obsessed with my daughters', I don't know why a person can even go there.... I know people would say, 'there's no way in hell your father did that'. And yet, Margaux was obsessed with him, Muffet was obsessed with him, and my mother allowed me to sleep with her my whole childhood practically. I slept with my mom from age seven to age sixteen. But I witnessed it as a kid, so... that's why I thought it never happened to me, because... I don't know why it didn't, but I just assumed it happened to them and it didn't happen to me.")

== Angler and conservationist ==
Throughout his life, Jack Hemingway was an avid fly fisherman. He fished "most of North America's great trout streams", and several of the world's best salmon rivers, such as the Lærdalselvi River in Norway.

A long-time resident of Idaho, Hemingway lived in Ketchum, Idaho. From 1971 to 1977, he was a commissioner on the Idaho Fish and Game Commission. Idaho's trout stocks increased as a result of Hemingway's success in getting the state to adopt a catch and release fishing law. His work with The Nature Conservancy was instrumental in preserving Silver Creek near Sun Valley, Idaho as one of Idaho's premier trout streams.

== Writer ==
Jack Hemingway assisted his father's fourth wife and widow, Mary Welsh Hemingway, with final editing before publication of A Moveable Feast (1964), his father's memoir of life in 1920s Paris, which was published three years after Ernest Hemingway's death.

Jack Hemingway also published an autobiography, Misadventures of a Fly Fisherman: My Life With and Without Papa, in 1986. A second autobiographical work, A Life Worth Living: The Adventures of a Passionate Sportsman, was released posthumously in 2002.

== Death and honors ==
Jack Hemingway died on December 1, 2000, at age 77 from complications following heart surgery in New York City. He had previously suffered a heart attack at around age 44. In 2001, the state of Idaho designated an annual "Jack Hemingway Conservation Day" in his honor. He is buried in Idaho at the Ketchum Cemetery, next to his wife Puck, daughter Margaux, father Ernest, step-mother Mary and half-sister Gloria.

== Writings ==
- Hemingway, Jack (1986). Misadventures of a Fly Fisherman: My Life With and Without Papa. Dallas: Taylor Pub. Co. ISBN 0-8783-3379-7
- Hemingway, Jack (2002). A Life Worth Living: The Adventures of a Passionate Sportsman. Guilford, Conn.: Lyons Press. ISBN 1-58574-325-9

== Sources ==
- Oliver, Charles M. (1999). Ernest Hemingway A to Z: The Essential Reference to the Life and Work. New York: Checkmark Publishing. ISBN 0-8160-3467-2
- Workman, Brooke (1983). "Twenty-Nine Things I Know about Bumby Hemingway". The English Journal. 72 (2): 24–26. doi:10.2307/816722. JSTOR 816722.
