= Hadley Richardson =

First wife of Ernest Hemingway

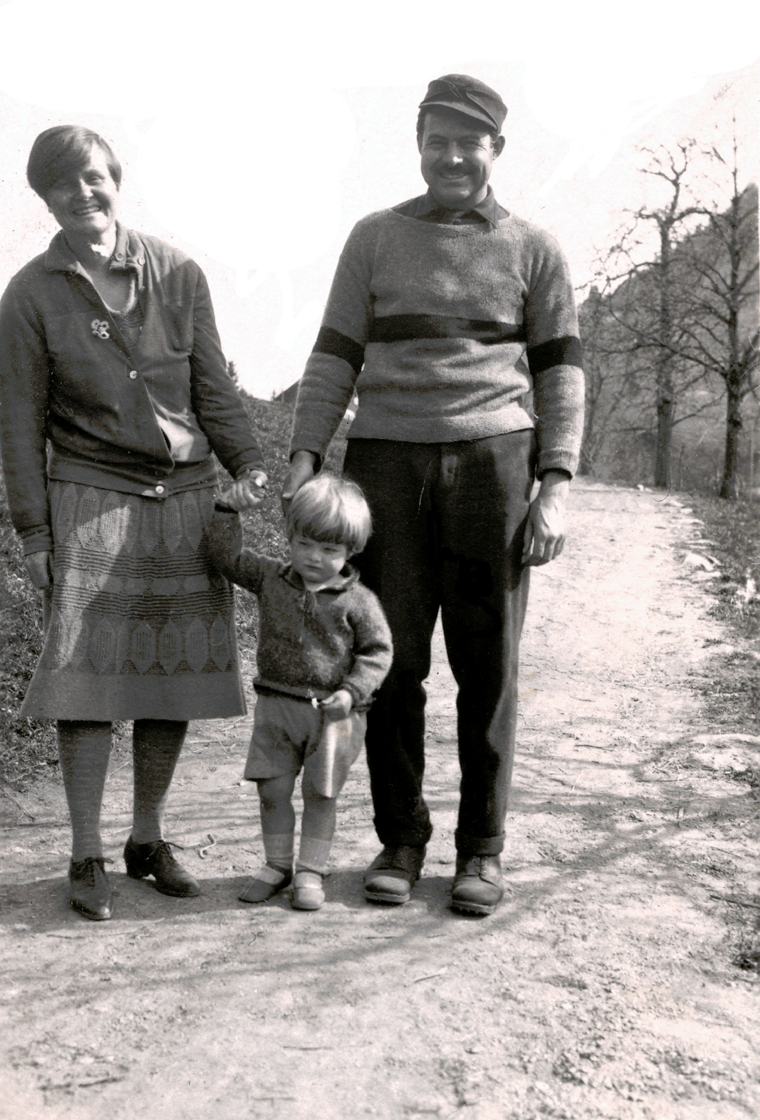
- Richardson with husband Ernest Hemingway and their son Jack in Schruns, Austria, in 1926
- Born: Elizabeth Hadley Richardson; November 9, 1891; St. Louis, Missouri, U.S.
- Died: January 22, 1979 (aged 87); Lakeland, Florida, U.S.
- Resting place: Chocorua Cemetery, Tamworth, New Hampshire
- Education: Bryn Mawr
- Occupation: Pianist
- Spouses: Ernest Hemingway (m. 1921; div. 1927) Paul Mowrer (m. 1933; died 1971)
- Children: Jack Hemingway

Elizabeth Hadley Richardson (November 9, 1891 – January 22, 1979) was the first wife of American author Ernest Hemingway. The two married in 1921 after a courtship of less than a year, and moved to Paris within months of being married. In Paris, Hemingway pursued a writing career, and through him Richardson met other expatriate American and British writers.

In 1926, Richardson learned of Hemingway's affair with Pauline Pfeiffer. Pfeiffer had been Richardson's best friend and had lived and traveled with the Hemingways. Richardson divorced Hemingway in 1927. In 1933, Richardson married a second time, to journalist Paul Mowrer, whom she met in Paris.

== Early life ==
Elizabeth Hadley Richardson was born on November 9, 1891, in St. Louis, Missouri, the youngest of five children. Richardson's mother, Florence Wyman Richardson (née Hadley), was an accomplished musician and singer, and her father, James Richardson Jr., worked for a family-owned pharmaceutical company. As a child, Richardson fell out of a second-story window and consequently was bed-ridden for a year. After the accident, her mother became overly protective, not allowing Richardson to learn how to swim or engage in other physical activities. Richardson's father was less protective, but in 1903 he died by suicide in response to financial difficulties.

As a teenager, Richardson became painfully shy and reclusive. She attended Mary Institute in St. Louis, and then attended college at Bryn Mawr. However, when her mother decided Richardson was "too delicate, both physically and emotionally," she left college. The death of her sister Dorothea in an apartment fire earlier that year may have contributed to Richardson's decision to leave college. Hemingway scholar Jamie Barlowe believes that (from Hemingway's point of view) Richardson represented a "True Woman" as opposed to a "New Woman" of the early 20th century. The "True Woman" was "emotional, dependent, gentle—a true follower."

After her return from college, Richardson lived a restricted life—her sister and her mother continued to worry about her health—with little opportunity for physical activity or much of a social life. Her mother did allow Richardson to visit her former Bryn Mawr roommate Edna Rapallo in Vermont one summer. While visiting her friend, she enjoyed playing tennis, and she met Maxfield Parrish, but when her mother became worried over her well-being, she was forced to return home. While her mother became reclusive and immersed herself in spiritualism, Richardson spent some years attempting to attain a career as a pianist, until she abandoned music, believing she lacked talent. She later did perform weekly in a church. When her mother developed Bright's Disease, Richardson nursed her until her death.

== Ernest Hemingway ==
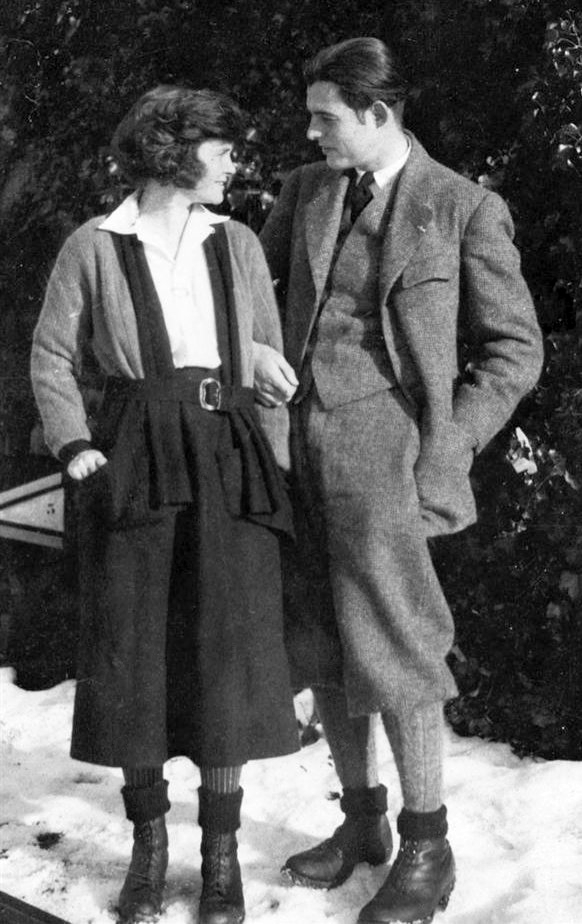
Richardson and Ernest Hemingway in Switzerland, 1922

Shortly after her mother's death, in December 1920, Richardson visited her old roommate Kate Smith (who later married John Dos Passos) in Chicago, and through her met Hemingway, who was living with Smith's brother and was employed as an associate editor of the monthly journal Cooperative Commonwealth. When Richardson returned to St. Louis, Hemingway, who became infatuated with her, wrote "I knew she was the girl I was going to marry." Richardson, eight years older than Hemingway, was red-haired, with a "nurturing instinct". Bernice Kert, author of The Hemingway Women, claims Richardson was "evocative" of the woman whom Hemingway met and fell in love with during his recuperation from injuries during World War I, Agnes von Kurowsky, but in Richardson, Hemingway saw a childishness Agnes lacked.

During the winter of 1921, Richardson took up music again and indulged in outdoor activities. She and Hemingway corresponded during the winter. When she expressed misgivings about their age difference, he "protested that it made no difference at all". Hemingway visited her in St. Louis in March 1921, and two weeks later she visited him in Chicago. Then they did not see each other for two months until he returned to St. Louis in May. In their correspondence, she promised to buy him a Corona typewriter for his birthday. In June, she announced her engagement despite objections to the marriage from his friends and her sister. Richardson believed she knew what she was doing, and more importantly, she had an inheritance with which to support herself and a husband. She believed in Hemingway's talent and believed she was "right for him".

They were married on September 3, 1921, in Bay Township, Michigan, and spent their honeymoon at the Hemingway family summer cottage on Walloon Lake. The weather was miserable, and both Richardson and Hemingway came down with fever, sore throat, and cough. The couple returned to Chicago after their honeymoon, where they lived in a small apartment on North Dearborn Street.

The death of a hated uncle gave Richardson another inheritance and additional financial independence for the couple. Initially, they intended to visit Rome, but Sherwood Anderson convinced them to visit Paris instead. Anderson's advice to live in Paris interested her, and when two months later Hemingway was hired as foreign correspondent for the Toronto Star, the couple left for Paris. Of Hemingway's marriage to Richardson, Hemingway biographer Jeffrey Meyers claims: "With Richardson, Hemingway achieved everything he had hoped for with Agnes: the love of a beautiful woman, a comfortable income, a life in Europe."

=== Paris ===
In Paris, Richardson and Hemingway lived in a small apartment at 74, rue du Cardinal Lemoine in the Latin Quarter. In the winter of 1921, he discovered the Shakespeare and Company bookshop, which also functioned as a lending library and was run by American expatriate Sylvia Beach. Richardson went there to buy James Joyce's works, which she liked, because Beach had published Joyce's Ulysses. The Hemingways first met Joyce at the book shop in March 1922.

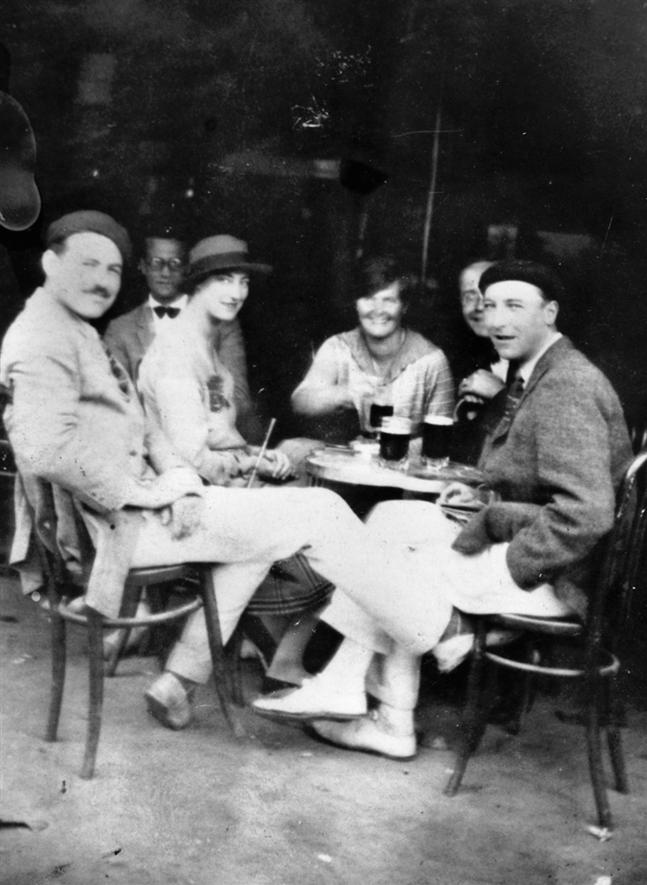
Ernest Hemingway (left), with Harold Loeb, Lady Duff Twysden (in hat), Hadley Richardson Hemingway, Donald Ogden Stewart (obscured), and Pat Guthrie (far right) in Pamplona, Spain, July 1925.

Through Anderson's letters of introduction, Hemingway met Ezra Pound, who invited the couple for tea, and they were invited to Gertrude Stein's salon. Stein in turn visited the young couple in their apartment. Hemingway's and Stein's relationship turned hostile after Hemingway gained fame (see Hemingway's Boat, Paul Hendrickson, 2011, and Hemingway, Kenneth Lynn, 1987). That spring, Richardson and Hemingway traveled to Italy and, in the summer, to Germany. Richardson went alone to Geneva in December 1922 to meet Hemingway who was covering a peace conference. It was during this trip, while waiting for a train at the Gare de Lyon, that Richardson misplaced and lost a suitcase filled with Hemingway's manuscripts. Devastated and angry at the loss of his work, he blamed her.

A few months later, when they learned Richardson was pregnant, the couple decided to move to Toronto for the child's birth. Before they left, the couple went for the first time to watch the bullfighting and the running of the bulls at the Festival of San Fermín in Pamplona. Their son John Hadley Nicanor Hemingway was born on October 10, 1923, in Toronto. He was named for his mother Hadley and for the young Spanish matador Nicanor Villalta, who had impressed Hemingway the previous summer. The baby was healthy, and the birth quick; Hemingway missed it, as he had been sent to New York on assignment, and was returning on a train when his wife went into labor. Richardson nicknamed the infant Bumby.

In Toronto, the family lived in a small apartment on Bathurst Street that had "wall space enough to hang their collection of paintings". Richardson called the assignments given to her husband at the Toronto Star "absurd". Hemingway considered Toronto boring and wanted to return to Paris to the life of a writer rather than live the life of a Toronto journalist. When Bumby was only a few months old, they returned to Paris, and in January 1924 moved into a new apartment on rue Notre Dame des Champs. Richardson hired a woman to help with housework and with Bumby, and borrowed a pram to take the baby on walks in the Luxembourg Gardens. Bumby's christening was held at St. Luke's Episcopal Church in March with "Chink" Dorman-Smith and Gertrude Stein as godparents. A few months later, mismanagement of her funds left Richardson with a financial loss, and at the same time, Hemingway started work as an editor for Ezra Pound and Ford Madox Ford's small modernist magazine the Transatlantic Review. In June, Richardson and Hemingway went again to Pamplona, leaving Bumby in Paris, and that winter, they went for the first time to Austria to vacation in Schruns.

Sometime after their return to Paris from Canada, Hemingway met the Pfeiffer sisters. When in June 1925 Hemingway and Richardson left Paris for their annual visit to Pamplona—the third year they had done so—they were accompanied by a group of American and British expatriates, including Pauline Pfeiffer. The trip inspired Hemingway's first novel The Sun Also Rises, which he began to write immediately after the fiesta, finishing it in September. In November, as a birthday present for Richardson, Hemingway bought Joan Miró's painting The Farm.

=== Divorce ===
Their marriage disintegrated as Hemingway was writing and revising The Sun Also Rises, but he still dedicated the novel to "Hadley and ...John Hadley Nicanor". For a second time they went to Schruns for Christmas, this time joined by Pauline Pfeiffer. After Christmas Hemingway returned to Paris with Pfeiffer, leaving Richardson with Bumby in Austria. While Richardson was in Austria, Hemingway sailed to New York then returned to Paris in March, at which time his affair with Pauline may have begun. In the spring of 1926, Richardson became aware of the affair, but she endured Pauline's presence in Pamplona that July. On their return to Paris, Richardson and Hemingway decided to separate, and Richardson formally requested a divorce in the fall. By November they had split their possessions, and Richardson accepted Hemingway's offer of the royalties from The Sun Also Rises. The couple divorced in January 1927, and Hemingway married Pauline Pfeiffer in May the same year.

== Paul Mowrer ==
Richardson stayed in France until 1934. Among her many friends in Paris was Paul Mowrer, foreign correspondent for the Chicago Daily News, whom she had met in the spring of 1927, not long after her divorce was finalized. A journalist and political writer, in 1929 Mowrer won the Pulitzer Prize. On July 3, 1933, after a five-year courtship, Richardson and Paul Mowrer were married in London. Richardson was especially grateful for Mowrer's warm relationship with Bumby. Not long after the two married, they moved back to the U.S. to Lake Bluff, Illinois, a suburb of Chicago, where they lived during World War II. She continued to receive royalties from The Sun Also Rises, which included the royalties for the 1957 film.

== A Moveable Feast ==
Hemingway's memoir A Moveable Feast, not published until 1964, three years after Hemingway's death, captures Hemingway's marriage to Richardson and their life together in Paris during the early to mid-1920s.

== Later years and death ==
When Richardson left her marriage to Hemingway, she left the limelight. She reportedly saw Hemingway only twice after their divorce. In July 1939, she and Mowrer ran into him while vacationing in Wyoming, and, according to A. E. Hotchner, the last time Hemingway reported seeing Richardson was after a brief and spontaneous meeting in Paris.

Richardson died on January 22, 1979, in Lakeland, Florida, at the age of 87. She is buried in New Hampshire at Chocorua Cemetery in Tamworth.

In 1992, Gioia Diliberto published a biography called Hadley, reissued in 2011 as Paris Without End: The True Story of Hemingway's First Wife. It is based on extensive research including the author's exclusive access to a series of taped conversations with Richardson.

In 2011, Paula McLain published The Paris Wife: A Novel, telling the story of Richardson's relationship with Hemingway in "her voice". Although a work of fiction, its narrative is faithful to the known facts.
