= Anne McLean =

Canadian translator

Anne McLean (1962, Toronto, Ontario) is a Canadian translator of Spanish literature. She began to learn Spanish in her late twenties and developed her language skills while living in Central America. Some years later in England, she took a master's degree in literary translation at Middlesex University. McLean has translated a number of Spanish and Latin American authors, including Gabriel García Márquez, Javier Cercas, Evelio Rosero, Juan Gabriel Vásquez, and Carmen Martín Gaite.

Jointly with the authors, she has won the Independent Foreign Fiction Prize twice: in 2004 for her translation of Soldiers of Salamis by Javier Cercas and again in 2009 for The Armies by Evelio Rosero. In 2014, her translation of Juan Gabriel Vásquez's The Sound of Things Falling was awarded the International Dublin Literary Award. She lives in Canada.

== Awards and nominations ==
- 2004 Independent Foreign Fiction Prize for Soldiers of Salamis by Javier Cercas
- 2009 Independent Foreign Fiction Prize for The Armies by Evelio Rosero
- 2009 shortlisted for the Independent Foreign Fiction Prize for The Informers by Juan Gabriel Vasquez
- 2013 shortlisted for the Independent Foreign Fiction Prize for Dublinesque by Enrique Vila-Matas (jointly translated with Rosalind Harvey).
- 2014 International Dublin Literary Award for The Sound of Things Falling by Juan Gabriel Vásquez

== Selected translations ==
- Carmen Martín Gaite – Living's the Strange Thing
- Eduardo Halfon – The Polish Boxer
- Daisy Rubiera Castillo – Reyita: The Life of a Black Cuban Woman in the Twentieth Century
- Enrique Vila-Matas – Dublinesque
- Enrique Vila-Matas – Never Any End to Paris
- Evelio Rosero – Good Offices
- Evelio Rosero – The Armies
- Héctor Abad – Recipes for Sad Women
- Hector Abad – Oblivion: a Memoir
- Ignacio Martínez de Pisón – To Bury the Dead
- Ignacio Padilla – Shadow Without a Name
- Isabel Allende – Maya's Notebook
- Javier Cercas – Soldiers of Salamis
- Javier Cercas – The Anatomy of a Moment
- Javier Cercas – The Speed of Light
- Javier Cercas – The Tenant and The Motive
- Javier Cercas – Outlaws
- Javier Cercas – Even the Darkest Night
- Juan Gabriel Vásquez – The Sound of Things Falling
- Juan Gabriel Vásquez – The Informers
- Juan Gabriel Vásquez – The Secret History of Costaguana
- Juan Gabriel Vásquez – The Shape of the Ruins
- Juan Gabriel Vásquez "Until August"
- Julio Cortázar – Autonauts of the Cosmoroute
- Julio Cortázar – Diary of Andrés Fava
- Paula Varsavsky – No One Said a Word
- Tomas Eloy Martínez – The Tango Singer
