= Premio Gregor von Rezzori =

The Premio Gregor von Rezzori (English: Gregor von Rezzori Award), also known as the Premio Gregor von Rezzori-Città di Firenze, is a literary prize awarded at the annual Festival degli Scrittori ("Writers' festival") in Florence, Italy.

== History ==
The Festival degli Scrittori and the Premio Gregor von Rezzori-Città di Firenze were established by the Santa Maddalena Foundation in 2007 in honor of Gregor von Rezzori, a Mitteleuropean writer, author of novels and memoirs. It was originally held at the Vallombrosa Abbey, southeast of Florence.

In 2010, it moved to the city of Florence, becoming the fulcrum of the writers' festival.

== The award ==
The award is assigned by an international jury to the best work of foreign fiction translated in Italy and published in the year preceding the awarding of the prize.

== Award winners ==
Past award winners include:

- 2025 - Ferdia Lennon (Ireland) - Glorious Exploits (2024)
- 2024 - Michael Cunningham (USA) - Day (2023)
- 2023 - Colm Tóibín (Ireland) - The Magician (2021)
- 2022 - Javier Marías (Spain) - Tomás Nevinson (2021)
- 2021 - Maaza Mengiste (USA/Ethiopia) - Il Re Ombra (2021)
- 2020 - Richard Powers (USA) - The Overstory (2018)
- 2019 - Annie Ernaux (France) - A Woman's Story (1989)
- 2018 - George Saunders (USA) - Lincoln in the Bardo (2017)
- 2017 - Mathias Enard (France) - Compass (2015)
- 2016 - Mircea Cărtărescu (Romania) - Orbitor (Blinding), vol. 2, Corpul ("The Body") (2002)
- 2015 - Vladimir Sorokin (Russia)- Day of the Oprichnik (2006)
- 2014 - Maylis de Kerangal (France) - Birth of a Bridge (2010)
- 2013 - Juan Gabriel Vasquez (Colombia) - The Sound of Things Falling (2011)
- 2012 - Enrique Vila-Matas (Spain) - Exploradores del abismo (2007)
- 2011 - Aleksandar Hemon (Bosnia and Herzegovina/USA) - The Lazarus Project (2008)
- 2010 - Percival Everett (USA) - Wounded (2005)
- 2009 - Jhumpa Lahiri (India/USA)- Unaccustomed Earth (2008)
- 2008 - Arturo Pérez-Reverte (Spain) - The Painter of Battles (2006)
- 2007 - Hisham Matar (Libya/USA) - In the Country of Men (2006)
