= Bartleby (disambiguation) =

Bartleby is the title character in Herman Melville's short story "Bartleby, the Scrivener".

Bartleby may also refer to:

- Bartleby (1970 film), a British film starring Thorley Walters
- Bartleby (1976 film), a French production
- Bartleby (2001 film), an American film starring Crispin Glover and David Paymer
- Bartleby, the protagonist of the movie Accepted (film)
- Bartleby, a character in the Jeff Smith comic Bone
- Bartleby, a character in the Kevin Smith movie Dogma
- Bartleby, a character in the animated series True and the Rainbow Kingdom
- Bartleby.com, an e-text archive

== See also ==
- Bartleby & Co., a 2000 novel by Enrique Vila-Matas
