= Gascar =

Gascar is a French surname. Notable people with the surname include:

- Henri Gascar (1635–1701), French painter
- Pierre Gascar (1916–1997), French author
