= A Moveable Feast =

1964 memoir by Ernest Hemingway

- First American edition
- Author: Ernest Hemingway
- Language: English
- Genre: Memoir/Autobiography
- Publisher: Scribner's (USA); Jonathan Cape (UK)
- Publication date: May 5, 1964
- Publication place: United States
- Text: A Moveable Feast online

A Moveable Feast is a memoir by Ernest Hemingway about his years as a struggling expatriate journalist and writer in Paris during the 1920s. It was published posthumously on May 5, 1964. The book chronicles Hemingway's first marriage to Hadley Richardson and his relationships with other cultural figures of the Lost Generation in interwar France.

Hemingway's memoir references many notable figures of the time including Sylvia Beach, Hilaire Belloc, Bror von Blixen-Finecke, Aleister Crowley, John Dos Passos, F. Scott and Zelda Fitzgerald, Ford Madox Ford, James Joyce, Wyndham Lewis, Pascin, Ezra Pound, Evan Shipman, Gertrude Stein, Alice B. Toklas, and Hermann von Wedderkop. The work mentions many bars, cafes, and hotels that still exist in Paris today.

Ernest Hemingway's suicide in July 1961 delayed the publication of the book, but it was published posthumously in 1964 by his fourth wife and widow, Mary Hemingway, from the original manuscripts and notes. Another edition, with revisions by his grandson Seán Hemingway, was published in 2009.

== Background ==
In November 1956, Hemingway recovered two small steamer trunks containing his notebooks from the 1920s that he had stored in the basement of the Hôtel Ritz Paris in March 1928. Hemingway's friend and biographer A. E. Hotchner, who was with him in Paris in 1956, recalled the event:

In 1956, Ernest and I were having lunch at the Hôtel Ritz Paris with Charles Ritz, the hotel's chairman, when Charley asked if Ernest was aware that a trunk of his was in the basement storage room, left there in 1930. Ernest did not remember storing the trunk but he did recall that in the 1920s Louis Vuitton had made a special trunk for him. Ernest had wondered what had become of it. Charley had the trunk brought up to his office, and after lunch Ernest opened it. It was filled with a ragtag collection of clothes, menus, receipts, memos, hunting and fishing paraphernalia, skiing equipment, racing forms, correspondence and, on the bottom, something that elicited a joyful reaction from Ernest: 'The notebooks! So that's where they were! Enfin!' There were two stacks of lined notebooks like the ones used by schoolchildren in Paris when he lived there in the '20s. Ernest had filled them with his careful handwriting while sitting in his favorite café, nursing a café crème. The notebooks described the places, the people, the events of his penurious life.Hotchner, A. E. (2009-07-19). "Don't Touch 'A Moveable Feast'". The New York Times.

Hemingway had the notebooks transcribed and began to turn them into the memoir that would eventually become A Moveable Feast. After Hemingway's death in 1961, his widow Mary Hemingway made final copy-edits to the manuscript before its publication in 1964. In a "note" in the 1964 edition of the work, she wrote:

Ernest started writing this book in Cuba in the autumn of 1957, worked on it in Ketchum, Idaho, in the winter of 1958-59, took it with him to Spain ... in April, 1959, and brought it back with him to Cuba and then to Ketchum late that fall. He finished the book in the spring of 1960 in Cuba.... He made some revisions ... in the fall of 1960 in Ketchum. It concerns the years 1921 to 1926 in Paris. - M.H.

Researchers, including literary scholar Gerry Brenner from the University of Montana, examined Hemingway's notes and initial drafts of A Moveable Feast in the collection the John F. Kennedy Library in Boston, Massachusetts. In a 1982 paper titled "Are We Going to Hemingway's Feast?", Brenner documented Mary Hemingway's editing process and questioned its validity. He concluded that some of her changes were misguided and that others had questionable motives. Brenner suggested that the changes contradicted Mary's "hands off" policy as executor. Brenner stated that Mary had changed the order of the chapters in Hemingway's final draft to "preserve chronology" and disrupted the juxtaposition of character sketches of individuals like Sylvia Beach, owner of the bookstore Shakespeare and Company, and Gertrude Stein. Mary reinserted a chapter titled "Birth of a New School", which Hemingway had dropped from his draft. Brenner's most serious charge was that the 1964 book deleted Hemingway's lengthy apology to Hadley, his first wife, which had appeared in various forms in every draft of the book. Brenner suggested that Mary deleted it because it impugned her role as wife.

Biographer Hotchner said that he had received a near final draft of A Moveable Feast in 1959, and that the version Mary Hemingway published was essentially the draft he had read then. In Hotchner's view, the original 1964 publication was the version that Hemingway intended and Mary Hemingway carried out Ernest's intentions. Hotchner described Hemingway's memoir as "a serious work", which Hemingway "certainly intended it for publication", and contended: "Because Mary was busy with matters relating to Ernest's estate, she had little involvement with the book.... What I read on the plane coming back from Cuba [in 1959] was essentially what was published. There was no extra chapter created by Mary.

== Title ==
If you are lucky enough to have lived in Paris as a young man, then wherever you go for the rest of your life, it stays with you, for Paris is a movable feast. - Ernest Hemingway, to a friend, 1950

— epigraph on title page of A Moveable Feast, Charles Scribner's Sons, New York, 1964, p. v.

The title, A Moveable Feast (a play on words for the term used for a holy day for which the date is not fixed), was suggested by Hemingway's friend and biographer A. E. Hotchner, who remembered Hemingway using the term in 1950. Hotchner's recollection of Hemingway's words became the source of the epigraph on the title page for the 1964 edition.

== Chapters ==
The 1964 edition of Hemingway's memoir consists of a preface by Hemingway (pg. ix), a "note" by his widow (pg. xi), and 20 independent chapters or sections. Each one can be read as a stand-alone piece or entity, not dependent upon the context of the whole work, nor necessarily arranged in any chronological order:

- "A Good Café on the Place St.-Michel"
- "Miss Stein Instructs"
- "Une Génération Perdue"
- "Shakespeare and Company"
- "People of the Seine"
- "A False Spring"
- "The End of an Avocation"
- "Hunger Was Good Discipline"
- "Ford Madox Ford and the Devil's Disciple"
- "Birth of a New School"
- "With Pascin at the Dôme"
- "Ezra Pound and His Bel Esprit"
- "A Strange Enough Ending"
- "The Man Who Was Marked for Death"
- "Evan Shipman at the Lilas"
- "An Agent of Evil"
- "Scott Fitzgerald"
- "Hawks Do Not Share"
- "A Matter of Measurements"
- "There Is Never Any End to Paris"

== Publishing history ==
The first edition was edited from Hemingway's manuscripts and notes by Mary Hemingway, his fourth wife and widow, and published posthumously in 1964, three years after Hemingway's death.

In 2009, another edition, titled the "Restored Edition", was published by Hemingway's grandson Seán Hemingway, curator at the Metropolitan Museum of Art. The 2009 edition made numerous changes:

- The introductory letter by Hemingway, pieced together from various fragments by Mary Hemingway, was removed.
- The chapter called "Birth of a New School" and sections of "Ezra Pound and the Measuring Worm" and "There Is Never Any End to Paris" (which has been renamed as "Winter in Schruns" and moved to chapter 16) included earlier omissions. The unpublished "The Pilot Fish and the Rich" was added.
- Chapter 7 ("Shakespeare and Company") became chapter 3; chapter 16 ("Nada y Pues Nada") moved to the end of the book as an "Additional Paris Sketch".
- Hemingway's use of the second person was restored in many places, a change that Seán said "brings the reader into the story".

From the new foreword by Patrick Hemingway:

"[H]ere is the last bit of professional writing by my father, the true foreword to A Moveable Feast: 'This book contains material from the remises of my memory and of my heart. Even if the one has been tampered with and the other does not exist'."

== Reception ==
=== Bennett Cerf ===
In 1964, Sheilah Graham appeared as a contestant on the CBS Television series What's My Line?, 23 years after the death of her boyfriend F. Scott Fitzgerald. This was telecast live on June 7, 1964, when A Moveable Feast was on bestseller lists. Bennett Cerf, the head of Random House who had known Sylvia Beach personally, and who was a regular panelist on the network television series, initiated the topic of Hemingway's new bestselling book.

Cerf: Miss Graham, after, after this new Hemingway book, I hope you're going to answer some of the remarks that were made in that book about Scott Fitzgerald.

Graham: Well, I would like to. I'm not sure I'm the right person, although I am the right person... Cerf: Ah, you certainly are the right person. Graham: ... to answer that. I thought it was rather dreadfully cruel to Scott Fitzgerald and, untrue in, uh, in certain areas, shall we say. Cerf: Well, I hope you'll straighten the record.

Graham: [unintelligible] ... try

=== Reactions to the 2009 edition ===
A.E. Hotchner alleged, among his other criticisms of the 2009 edition, that Seán Hemingway had edited it, in part, to exclude references to his grandmother (Hemingway's second wife Pauline Pfeiffer) that he found less than flattering. On the 2009 edition, Hotchner said:

"Ernest was very protective of the words he wrote, words that gave the literary world a new style of writing. Surely he has the right to have these words protected against frivolous incursion, like this reworked volume that should be called "A Moveable Book".

Other critics have found fault with some of Seán Hemingway's editorial changes. Irene Gammel wrote about the new edition: "Ethically and pragmatically, restoring an author's original intent is a slippery slope when the published text has stood the test of time and when edits have been approved by authors or their legal representatives." Pointing to the complexity of authorship, she concluded that "Mary's version should be considered the definitive one, while the 'restored' version provides access to important unpublished contextual sources that illuminate the evolution of the 1964 edition."

== Legacy ==
=== Adaptations ===
On September 15, 2009, Variety reported that Mariel Hemingway, a granddaughter of Ernest Hemingway and his first wife, had acquired the film and television rights to the memoir with American film producer John Goldstone. The Hollywood Reporter wrote in March 2011 that Jeff Baena was writing a film adaptation for an indie production. In 2019, it was reported that a television series was being developed through Village Roadshow Entertainment Group, but there was no planned release date.

=== Cultural references ===
==== In films ====
- The comedy film The Moderns (1988) brings the characters of A Moveable Feast to life while spoofing the pretense of the Lost Generation.
- The book is featured in the movie City of Angels (1998) during an exchange between Nicolas Cage and Meg Ryan.
- Woody Allen's 2011 film Midnight in Paris is set in the Paris of the 1920s as portrayed in Hemingway's book, and the movie features the Owen Wilson character interacting with Hemingway, Gertrude Stein, and F. Scott and Zelda Fitzgerald, and uses the phrase "a moveable feast" in two instances.
- The Words (2012) uses an excerpt from A Moveable Feast to represent a book manuscript found in an old messenger bag.
- In the American movie Captain America: The Winter Soldier (2014), one of the books on the shelf in the character Steve Rogers' apartment is Hemingway's A Moveable Feast.
- In the American film French Postcards (1979), a character quotes the epigraph from the book in order to convince a fellow American student who is studying in France with him to not only study, but enjoy life in Paris.
- In the American comedy film Harold & Kumar Escape from Guantanamo Bay (2008), a stripper named Tits Hemingway says she got the latter part of her name because her favorite novel is A Moveable Feast.

==== In literature ====
- The writer Enrique Vila-Matas named his book Never Any End to Paris (2003) after the final chapter of Hemingway's work.

==== In stage performances ====
- In his stand-up performances in the late 1960s, Woody Allen performed a routine that referenced the recently published book and described imaginary times spent with Hemingway, the Fitzgeralds, and Gertrude Stein with the recurring punch line: "And Hemingway punched me in the mouth."

=== Revival in France ===
A Moveable Feast became a bestseller in France following the November 13, 2015 terrorist attacks in Paris. In the context of the attacks, the book's French-language title, Paris est une fête, was seen as a symbol of defiance and celebration. Bookstore sales of the volume surged and copies of the book appeared in makeshift memorials across the city in honor of victims of the attacks.

=== Hemingway's wine ===
In A Moveable Feast, Hemingway described what life was like for aspiring writers in 1920s Paris. In addition to writing about his friendships, marriage, and writing routine in Parisian cafes, Hemingway also discussed his love of good wine, noting the different wines he and his friends enjoyed with their meals.

- Sancerre: A False Spring, "Another day later that year when we had come back from one of our voyages and had good luck at some track again we stopped at Prunier's on the way home, going in to sit at the bar after looking at the clearly priced wonders in the window. We had oysters and crab mexicane with glasses of Sancerre."
- Mâcon: Scott Fitzgerald, "We had a marvellous lunch from the hotel at Lyon, an excellent truffled roast chicken, delicious bread and white Mâcon wine and Scott was very happy when we drank the white Maconnais at each of our stops. At Mâcon I had bought four more bottles of excellent wine which I uncorked as we needed them."
- Corsican: With Pascin at the Dôme, "At home, over the sawmill, we had a Corsican wine that had a great authority and a low price. It was a very Corsican wine and you could dilute it by half with water and still receive its message."
- Cahors: With Pascin at the Dôme, "At the Negre de Toulouse we drank the good Cahors wine from the quarter, the half or the full carafe, usually diluting it about one-third with water...In Paris, then, you could live very well on almost nothing and by skipping meals occasionally and never buying any new clothes, you could save and have luxuries."

In September 2020, Chiswick Book Festival featured a wine and literature event celebrating Hemingway's wine in A Moveable Feast presented by Victoria Daskal.

== Bibliography ==
- Baker, Carlos (1972) [1st ed. 1952]. Hemingway: The Writer as Artist (4th ed.). Princeton University Press. ISBN 0-691-01305-5. "isbn:0691013055."
- Mellow, James R. (1992). Hemingway: A Life Without Consequences. New York: Houghton Mifflin. ISBN 0-395-37777-3.
- Meyers, Jeffrey (1985). Hemingway: A Biography. London: Macmillan. ISBN 0-333-42126-4.
- Oliver, Charles M. (1999). Ernest Hemingway A to Z: The Essential Reference to the Life and Work. New York: Checkmark. ISBN 0-8160-3467-2.
- Stoneback, H. R. (2010). Hemingway's Paris: Our Paris?. Wickford, RI: New Street Communications, LLC. ISBN 978-1-4538-7776-0. Archived from the original on 2010-10-22.
