= The Anatomy of a Moment (TV series) =

Spanish television series

- Promotional release poster
- Spanish: Anatomía de un instante
- Based on: The Anatomy of a Moment by Javier Cercas
- Teleplay by: Rafael Cobos; Fran Araújo; Alberto Rodríguez
- Directed by: Alberto Rodríguez; Paco R. Baños
- Starring: Álvaro Morte; Eduard Fernández; Manolo Solo
- Music by: Julio de la Rosa
- Country of origin: Spain
- Original language: Spanish
- No. of seasons: 1
- No. of episodes: 4

Production
- Executive producers: José Manuel Lorenzo; Domingo Corral; Manuela Ocón Aburto; Fran Araújo
- Cinematography: Álex Catalán
- Production companies: Movistar Plus+; DLO Producciones

Original release
- Network: Movistar Plus+
- Release: 20 November 2025

The Anatomy of a Moment (Spanish: Anatomía de un instante) is a 2025 historical drama limited television series directed by Alberto Rodríguez based on the book The Anatomy of a Moment by Javier Cercas set against the backdrop of the 23 February 1981 coup d'état attempt in Spain. The cast is led by Álvaro Morte, Eduard Fernández, and Manolo Solo, respectively portraying Adolfo Suárez, Santiago Carrillo, and Manuel Gutiérrez Mellado.

== Plot ==
The plot explores the circumstances of the characters of Adolfo Suárez, Santiago Carrillo, and Manuel Gutiérrez Mellado leading up to the 1981 Spanish coup attempt.

== Cast ==
- Eduard Fernández as Santiago Carrillo
- Álvaro Morte as Adolfo Suárez
- Miki Esparbé as Juan Carlos I
- Manolo Solo as Manuel Gutiérrez Mellado
- Samuel López as Alfonso Guerra
- Ignacio Castillo as Landelino Lavilla
- Juanma Navas as Alfonso Armada
- David Lorente as Antonio Tejero
- Óscar de la Fuente as Milans del Bosch
- Alejandra Onieva as Carmen Díez de Rivera
- Pedro Casablanc as Teodulfo Lagunero
- Sebastián Haro as Torcuato Fernández Miranda

== Production ==
The series is a Movistar Plus+ and DLO Producciones production, with the association of ARTE France. Based on the book The Anatomy of a Moment by Javier Cercas, the series was written by Rafael Cobos and Fran Araújo. Shooting locations included the Palacio de las Cortes.

== Release ==
Movistar Plus+ released the series on 20 November 2025. At the 2025 Series Mania, an agreement between Movistar Plus+ and ARTE France was announced concerning distribution in the territories operated by the latter network.

The series made it to the official selection of the 73rd San Sebastián International Film Festival for a non-competitive pre-screening in September 2025. 4 episodes of the series will also be screened in non-competitive 'Freestyle: Series' section of the 20th Rome Film Festival in October 2025.

== Accolades ==
Year	Award	Category	Nominee(s)	Result	Ref.
2025	31st Forqué Awards	Best Series		Won	
2025	31st Forqué Awards	Best Actor in a Series	Álvaro Morte	Nominated	
2026	13th Feroz Awards	Best Drama Series		Nominated	
2026	13th Feroz Awards	Best Main Actor in a Series	Álvaro Morte	Nominated	
2026	13th Feroz Awards	Best Supporting Actor in a Series	Eduard Fernández	Nominated	
2026	13th Feroz Awards	Best Supporting Actor in a Series	Manolo Solo	Nominated	
2026	13th Feroz Awards	Best Screenplay in a Series	Rafael Cobos, Fran Araújo, Alberto Rodríguez	Nominated	
2026	81st CEC Medals	Best Series		Won	
2026	81st CEC Medals	Best Ensemble Cast in a Series		Won	
2026	34th Actors and Actresses Union Awards	Best Television Actor in a Leading Role	Álvaro Morte	Won	
2026	34th Actors and Actresses Union Awards	Best Television Actor in a Secondary Role	David Lorente	Won	
2026	34th Actors and Actresses Union Awards	Best Television Actor in a Minor Role	Miki Esparbé	Nominated	
2026	34th Actors and Actresses Union Awards	Best Television Actress in a Minor Role	Alejandra Onieva	Nominated	
2026	9th ALMA Awards	Best Screenplay in a Drama Series	Fran Araújo, Rafael Cobos, Alberto Rodríguez	Won	
2026	13th Platino Awards	Best Miniseries or TV Series		Pending	
2026	13th Platino Awards	Best Series Creator	Rafael Cobos, José Manuel Lorenzo, Fran Araújo y Alberto Rodríguez	Pending	
2026	13th Platino Awards	Best Actor in a Miniseries or TV Series	Álvaro Morte	Pending	
2026	13th Platino Awards	Best Supporting Actor in a Miniseries or TV Series	David Lorente	Pending	
2026	13th Platino Awards	Best Supporting Actor in a Miniseries or TV Series	Eduard Fernández	Pending	
2026	13th Platino Awards	Best Original Score in a Miniseries or TV Series	Julio de la Rosa	Pending	
2026	13th Platino Awards	Best Cinematography in a Miniseries or TV Series	Alejandro Catalán	Pending	
2026	13th Platino Awards	Best Editing in a Miniseries or TV Series	José M.G. Moyano	Pending	
2026	13th Platino Awards	Best Art Direction in a Miniseries or TV Series	Pepe Domínguez del Olmo	Pending	
2026	13th Platino Awards	Best Sound in a Miniseries or TV Series	Daniel de Zayas	Pending	
2026	13th Platino Awards	Best Costume Design in a Miniseries or TV Series	Fernando García	Pending	
2026	13th Platino Awards	Best Makeup and Hairstyles in a Miniseries or TV Series	Yolanda Piña, Nacho Díaz	Pending	
2026	54th International Emmy Awards	Best TV Movie or Miniseries		Pending	

== See also ==
- 2025 in Spanish television
