= Javier Cercas =

Spanish writer, journalist and professor (born 1962)

The Most Excellent Javier Cercas
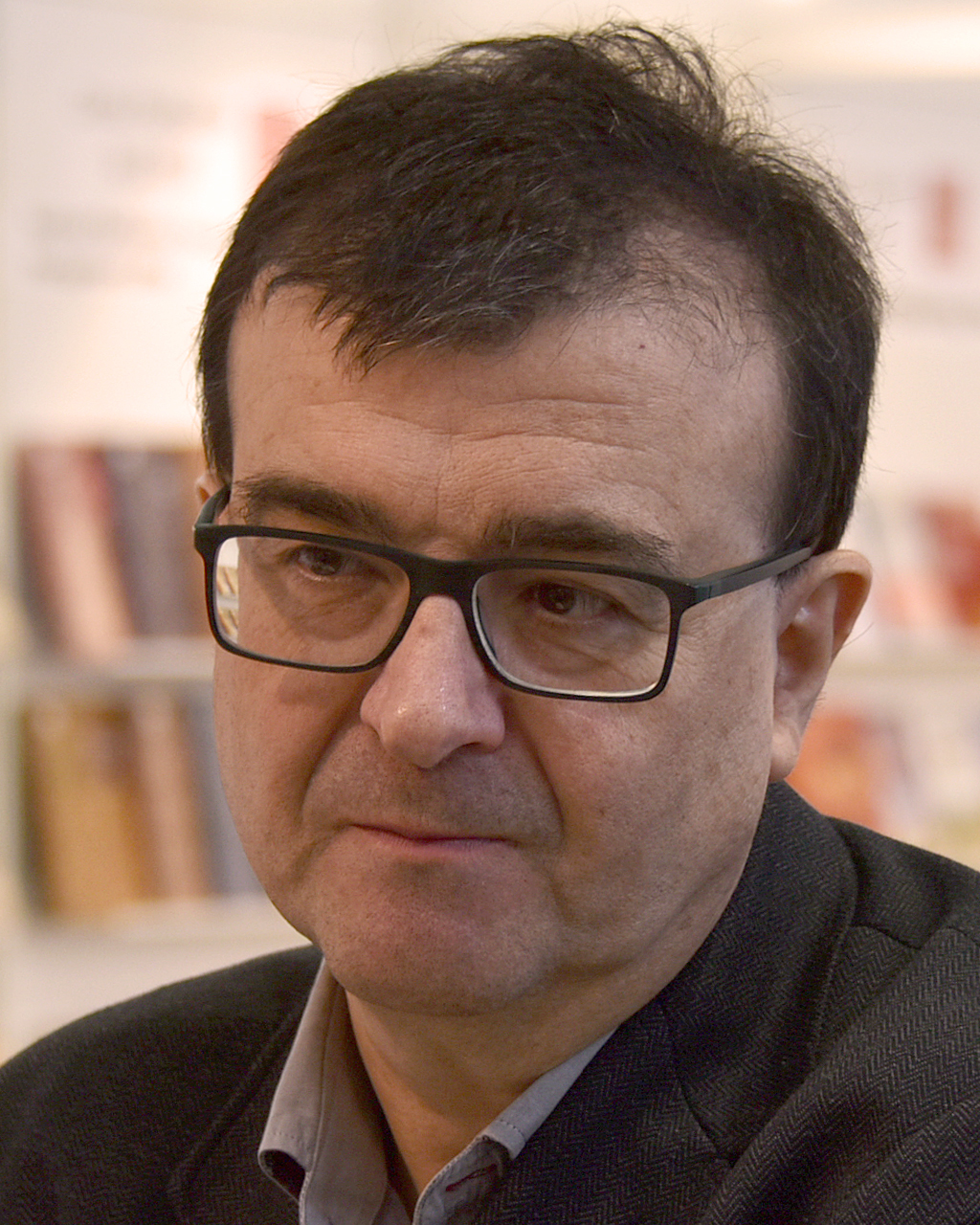
- Cercas in 2019
- Born: Javier Cercas Mena; 6 April 1962 (age 64); Ibahernando, Spain
- Education: University of Girona
- Occupations: Professor, writer
- Notable work: Soldiers of Salamis; The Speed of Light; The Impostor
- Awards: Independent Foreign Fiction Prize; European Book Prize

Seat R of the Real Academia Española
- Incumbent
- Assumed office 24 November 2024 (Note: Elected on 13 June 2024)
- Preceded by: Javier Marías

Javier Cercas Mena (born 1962) is a Spanish writer and professor of Spanish literature at the University of Girona, Spain. Awards he has won for his novels include the Independent Foreign Fiction Prize for Soldiers of Salamis (translated by Anne McLean), and the European Book Prize for The Impostor (translated by Frank Wynne).

== Biography ==
Javier Cercas was born in Ibahernando, Cáceres, Spain. He is a frequent contributor to the Catalan edition of El País and the Sunday supplement. He worked for two years at the University of Illinois Urbana-Champaign in Illinois, United States.

He is part of a group of well-known Spanish novelists who have published "historical memory" fiction, focusing on the Spanish Civil War and Francoist state, including Julio Llamazares, Andrés Trapiello, and Jesús Ferrero.

Soldiers of Salamis (translated by Anne McLean) won the Independent Foreign Fiction Prize in 2004. McLean's translations of his novels The Speed of Light and Outlaws were also shortlisted for the International Dublin Literary Award, in 2008 and 2016 respectively.

During the 2014–15 academic year, he was the Weidenfeld Visiting Professor of European Comparative Literature at St Anne's College at Oxford, England. He was awarded the 2016 European Book Prize for The Impostor.

In 2025 he released God's Fool, which he described as a "non-fiction novel", being a mixture of chronicle, autobiography and biography, about his travel to Mongolia with Pope Francis and talks of religion, Christianity in particular, while himself being atheist and anti-clerical.

== Bibliography ==
- 1987, El móvil
- 1989, El inquilino (The Tenant and the Motive) (English translation, 2005)
- 1994, La obra literaria de Gonzalo Suárez
- 1997, El vientre de la ballena
- 1998, Una buena temporada
- 2000, Relatos reales
- 2001, Soldados de Salamina (Soldiers of Salamis) (English translation by Anne McLean, 2004)
- 2005, La velocidad de la luz (The Speed of Light) (English translation by Anne McLean, 2006)
- 2009, Anatomía de un instante (The Anatomy of a Moment) (English translation by Anne McLean, 2011)
- 2012, Las leyes de la frontera (published as Outlaws) (English translation by Anne McLean, 2014)
- 2014, El Impostor (The Impostor) (English translation by Frank Wynne, 2017)
- 2017, El monarca de las sombras (Lord of All the Dead) (English translation by Anne McLean, 2020)
- 2018, The Blind Spot (MacLehose Press) (English translation by Anne McLean, 2018)
- 2019, Even the Darkest Night (Terra Alta I) (English translation by Anne McLean, 2022)
- 2021, Independencia (Terra Alta II)
- 2022, El castillo de Barbazul (Terra Alta III)
- 2025, El loco de Dios en el fin del mundo (English translation forthcoming by Anne McLean, 2028)

== Adaptations ==
Cercas's 2009 The Anatomy of a Moment was adapted into a TV miniseries in 2025.

== Honorary doctorat degree ==
Toulouse Capitole University, December 8 2025.
