= The Speed of Light =

2005 novel by Javier Cercas

La velocidad de la luz
- First edition
- Author: Javier Cercas
- Original title: La velocidad de la luz
- Translator: Anne McLean
- Language: Spanish
- Series: Javier Cercas
- Publisher: Tusquets Editores
- Publication date: 2005
- Publication place: Spain
- Pages: 312
- ISBN: 978-84-8310-298-5

The Speed of Light (Spanish: La velocidad de la luz) is the fifth book of narrative Spanish writer Javier Cercas. The novel was first published in March 2005 by Tusquets Editores. The book was translated into English by Anne McLean, then published by Bloomsbury in 2006. In 2008, it was shortlisted for the International Dublin Literary Award. The book discusses a friendship with a Vietnam War veteran.
