= Maurice Olender =

French historian and academic (1946–2022)

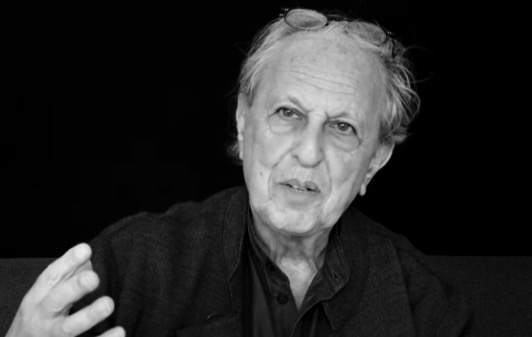

Maurice Olender (21 April 1946 – 27 October 2022) was a Belgian-French historian, professor at the École des hautes études en sciences sociales (EHESS) in Paris. His teaching focused in particular on the genesis of the idea of race in the nineteenth century. He also published widely on the intellectual history of the concepts of Indo-European languages and Proto-language, most importantly in his monograph Les langues du Paradis. As editor, he headed the journal Le Genre humain and La librairie du XXIe siècle at Éditions du Seuil.

Olender died in Brussels on 27 October 2022, at the age of 76.

== Scientific responsibilities ==
- Cofounder of the Scuola internazionale di alti studi scienze della cultura of Modena (Italy) in 1995. Founding member of its Scientific Advisory Board (1995–2009)
- Associate professor and member of the board of the Martin Buber Institute of the Free University of Brussels.
- Member of the Steering Committee des Mishkenot Encounters for Religion and Culture, in Jerusalem.
- Member of the first editorial board, created in 1988, of the Revue de l'histoire des religions founded in 1880.
- Directed the interdisciplinary journal Le genre humain, since its creation in 1981

== Selected publications ==
- 1978: (dir.) with J. Sojcher, Le récit et sa représentation, Colloque de Saint-Hubert, Éditions Payot.
- 1979: (dir.) with J. Sojcher, La séduction, Colloque de Bruxelles n°1), Paris, Aubier, coll. "Les Colloques de Bruxelles", 1980 (ISBN 2-7007-0178-X).
- 1981: (dir.), Le racisme : mythes et sciences : pour Léon Poliakov, texts by Pierre Birnbaum, Michel de Certeau, Michèle Duchet, Maurice de Gandillac et al., Brussels, Éditions Complexe et Paris, PUF, ISBN 2-87027-059-3.
- 1989: Les langues du Paradis : Aryens et Sémites, un couple providentiel, preface by Jean-Pierre Vernant, Paris, Gallimard et Éditions du Seuil, coll. « Hautes études », ISBN 2-02-010883-6 ; rééd. Paris, Éditions du Seuil, "Points", 1994 ISBN 2-02-021148-3 ; reworked and expanded edition, 2002 ISBN 2-02-021148-3. This works has been translated into 12 languages.
- 2005: La chasse aux évidences : sur quelques formes de racisme entre mythe et histoire (1978–2005). Paris: Galaade. ISBN 2-35176-008-5.
  - English translation: Race and Erudition. Trans. by Marie Jane Todd. Cambridge, Mass.–London: Harvard University Press, 2009.
- 2009: Race sans histoire, Points Seuil n°620 ISBN 978-2-7578-0685-2 (see Le Monde 17–18 May 2009) (in English: Race and Erudition: by Maurice Olender, published by Harvard University Press
- 2010: Matériau du rêve, éd. IMEC, coll. "Le Lieu de l’archive", Condé-sur-Noireau.
- 2011: Réponse du muet au parlant : En retour à Jean-Luc Godard, Seuil, with Alain Fleischer.
- 2013: Le genre humain, N° 53 : Jean-Pierre Vernant, dedans dehors, Seuil, with François Vitrani.

== Learned societies and prizes ==
- Member of the Société de linguistique de Paris
- Member of the Société asiatique
- Crowned by the Académie française in 1990 for Les langues du Paradis, Hautes études, Gallimard/Seuil, 1989
- Prix Roger Caillois for essays in 2007 for La chasse aux évidences : sur quelques formes de racisme entre mythe et histoire, 1978–2005, Paris, Galaade, 2005
