= Never Any End to Paris =

Never Any End to Paris (Spanish: París no se acaba nunca) is a book by Enrique Vila-Matas first published in Spanish in 2003 and first published in English by New Directions Publishing (translated by Anne McLean) in 2011. The title is taken from the final chapter of A Moveable Feast by Ernest Hemingway (a work that Vila-Matas read at the age of fifteen which inspired him to eventually move to Paris to become a writer).

== Content ==
The book is a fictionalised autobiographical portrait of a youthful segment of Vila-Matas's life that was spent in Paris in the 1970s (during which he lived in a room that was rented from Marguerite Duras). As part of a kind of literary apprenticeship, Duras gave him a 13-point set of instructions for writing novels.

In particular, Vila-Matas explores the complexities and difficulties of living a life as an unknown writer attempting to make a name for himself in the literary world, chiefly as a result of financial and material poverty as well as the problem of attempting to gain recognition in a pre-existing literary milieu. The narrator relates a wide number of notable people and luminaries that he encountered during that period, encompassing, for instance, Sergio Pitol, Juan Marsé, Edgardo Cozarinsky, Roland Barthes, Georges Perec, Isabelle Adjani and Samuel Beckett. He also describes the challenges of living as somebody who is in effect exiled from his homeland, given his opposition to the rule of General Franco in his native Spain.

The work is constructed in the form of a lecture which spans three separate days and involves the deliberate blurring of the boundary between fiction and non-fiction as well as elements of meta-fiction. At the opening of the book, for instance, the question is posed: "Am I a lecture or a novel?", raising immediate questions over its form and how that relates to its content. In terms of the question of how far the book is autobiographical and true to life, Vila-Matas argues that truth is more important than reality, drawing a distinction between the two and suggesting that the form of writing that he used to create Never Any End to Paris is one that manifests a form of truth that is of greater validity than if he had presented a version of his story that was merely 'realistic'.

The work is evocative of the literary style and preoccupations of other writers such as Roberto Bolaño, who Vila-Matas met and befriended in 1996.

Despite his pronouncements that he was poor and unhappy in Paris (in contrast to a poor and happy Hemingway), Vila-Matas's book is also driven by a general love of Paris as a city in itself.
