= Tomás Eloy Martínez =

Argentine journalist and writer (1934 – 2010)

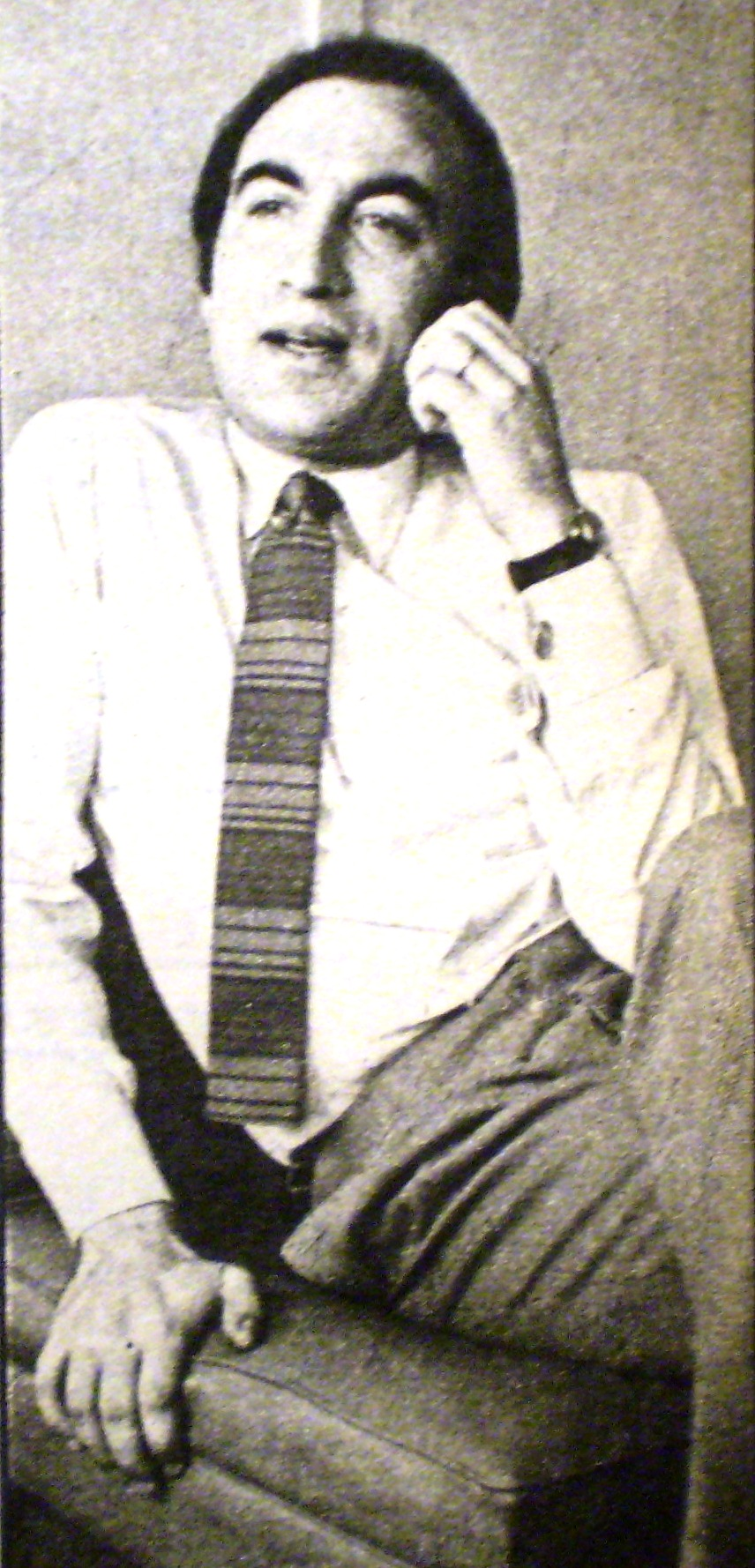
Tomás Eloy Martínez

Tomás Eloy Martínez (July 16, 1934 – January 31, 2010) was an Argentine journalist and writer.

== Life and work ==
He was born on July 16, 1934 in San Miguel de Tucumán and is generally considered an influential and innovative figure in Latin America both as a journalist and a novelist. Eloy Martínez obtained a degree in Spanish and Latin American literature from the University of Tucumán, and a Masters of Art at the University of Paris.

From 1957 to 1961 he was a film critic in Buenos Aires for the La Nación newspaper, and he then was editor in chief of the magazine Primera Plana between 1962 and 1969.

From 1969 to 1970 he worked as a reporter in Paris. In 1969 Eloy Martínez interviewed former Argentine President Juan Domingo Perón, who was exiled in Madrid. These interviews were the basis for two of his more celebrated novels: La Novela de Perón (1985) and Santa Evita (1995). In these as in many of his books he combined historical true facts with fictional content in a way unparalleled by any other Latin American writer.

In 1970 he and many former writers of Primera Plana worked at the magazine Panorama, where Eloy Martínez was the director. He also collaborated in the newspaper La Opinion, founded by Jacobo Timmerman. He is credited as helping Latin American writings be know around the world, including the Gabriel García Márquez staple novel One Hundred Years of Solitude.

On August 15, 1972 he learned of the uprising of political prisoners in the jail at Rawson, Chubut Province. Panorama was the only publication in Buenos Aires that reported the correct story of the affair in Rawson, which differed significantly from the official version of the de facto Argentine government. On 22 August he was fired at the behest of the government, whereupon he went to Rawson and the neighboring city of Trelew and from there he reported the Massacre of Trelew in his book The Passion According to Trelew. The book was banned by the Argentine dictatorship.

For three years (1972–1975) Eloy Martínez was in charge of the cultural supplement of La Nación. La Opinión was shut down by the military authorities who seized power in 1976. After this, he was forced to live in exile (1975–1983) and moved to Caracas, Venezuela, where he remained active as a journalist, co-founding the newspaper El Diario de Caracas. In his book The Memoirs of the General he recounts that he was threatened by the "Triple A", the Alianza Anticomunista Argentina, and on one occasion, gunmen held a pistol to the head of his three-year-old son because they were witnesses to a crime Eloy Martínez believed to be an operation led by the far-right paramilitary group. Around 1979, he met the intellectual Susana Rotker, with whom he had a daughter Sol Ana in 1986.

During the year 1984 he moved to the United States to the Washington, D.C., area and was a professor at the University of Maryland.

In 1991, he participated in the creation and launch of the daily newspaper Siglo 21 (November 8, 1991), owned by businessman Alfonso Dau and published by Jorge Zepeda Patterson in Guadalajara, Mexico, which ran for seven years, until December 1998. Also, he created the literary supplement Primer Plano for the newspaper Página/12 in Buenos Aires.

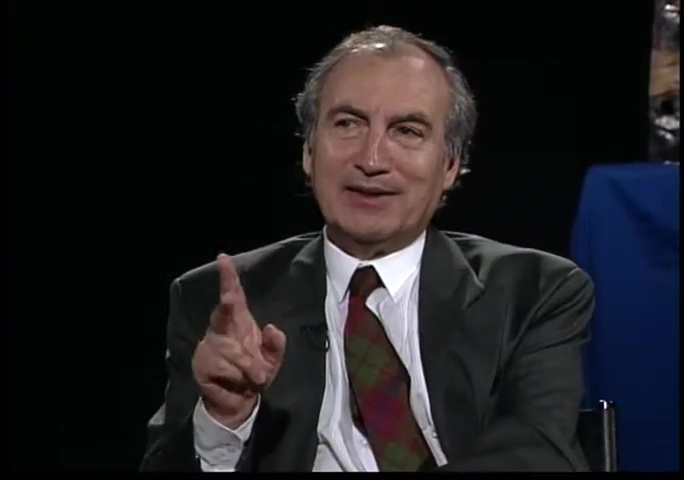
Martínez on CUNY TV's Charlando con Cervantes, 1996

The end of the 1990s saw him back in the United States, being entrusted as professor and director of the Latin American studies program at Rutgers University in New Jersey, although he maintained his collaboration with Latin American newspapers throughout this period, which was the inspiration as well for his last book Purgatory where he dealt with the sadness and melancholy of exile and the dire impact on the lives of the families of the "desaparecidos" (people that were kidnapped and presumed dead by the dictatorship known as "El Proceso").

Eloy Martínez was also a teacher and lecturer. He wrote columns for La Nación and the New York Times syndicate, and his articles have appeared in many newspapers and journals in Latin America. He was awarded the Guggenheim and Woodrow Wilson fellowships, and won the 2002 Premio Alfaguara de Novela for the novel Flight of the Queen. His works deal primarily (but not exclusively) with Argentina during and after the rule of Juan Domingo Perón and his wife, Eva Duarte de Perón (Evita).

Tomás Eloy Martínez died in Buenos Aires on January 31, 2010, from cancer.

An exhaustive list of his works may be found in The Other Reality—Anthology with a prologue by Cristine Mattos, Buenos Aires, Fondo de Cultura Económica de Argentina, S.A., 2006.

== Main publications ==
- Sacred (1969)
- The Passion According to Trelew (1973, reissued in 1997)
- The Perón Novel (1985)
- La Mano del Amo (1991)
- Santa Evita (1995)
- The Memoirs of the General (1996)
- Common Place - Death (1998)
- The Argentine Dream (1999)
- True Fictions (2000)
- The Flight of the Queen (2002)
- Requiem for a Lost Country (2003)
- The Lives of the General (2004)
- The Tango Singer translated by Anne McLean (2004)
- Purgatory translated by Frank Wynne (2008)
