= Rodrigo Fresán =

Argentinian writer and journalist

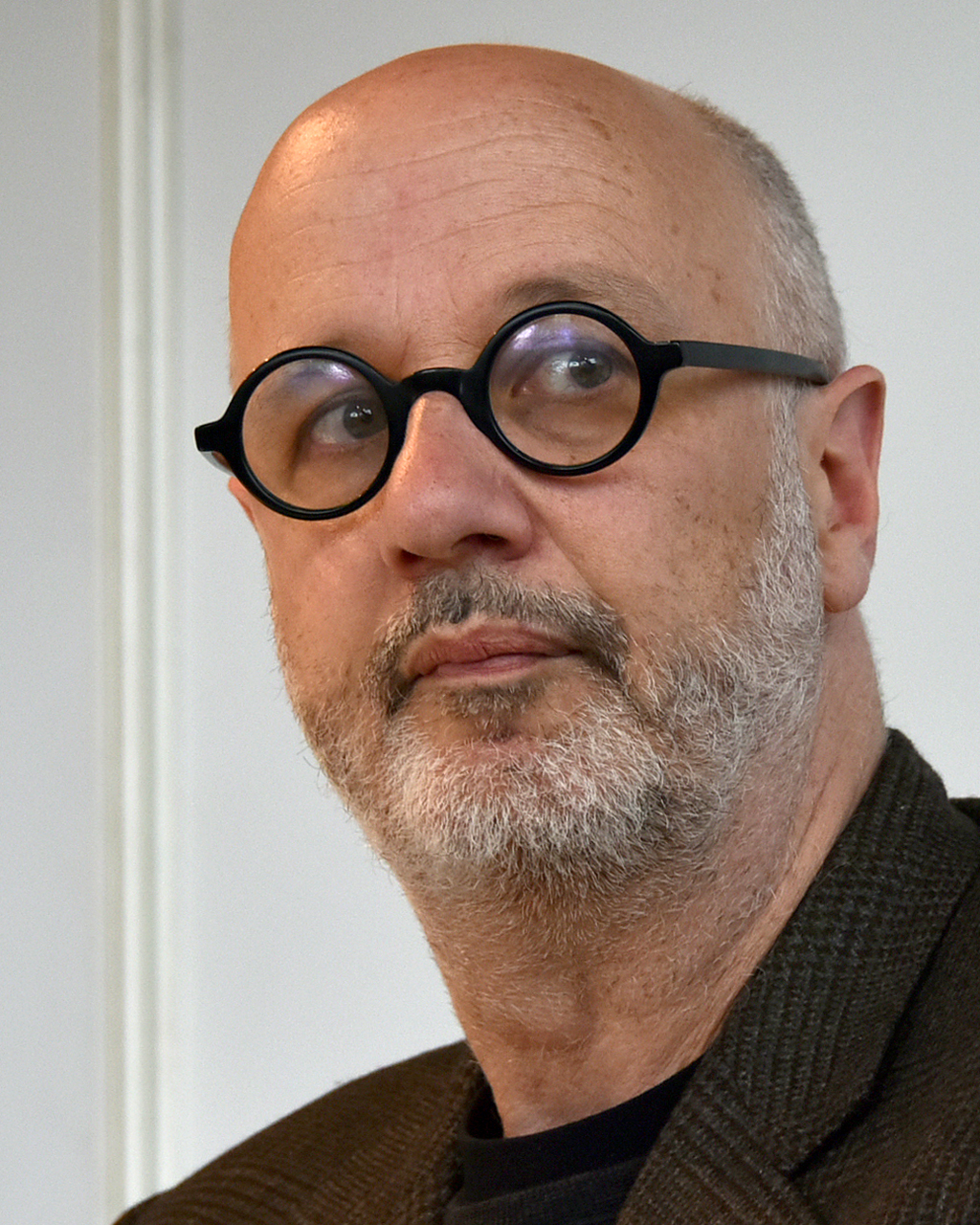
- Rodrigo Fresán (2019)
- Born: 1963 (age 62–63); Buenos Aires, Argentina
- Occupation: Writer
- Writing career
- Notable awards: Prix Roger Caillois, Best Translated Book Award

Rodrigo Fresán (born 1963 in Buenos Aires, Argentina) is an Argentinian fiction writer and journalist. Since 1999, Fresán has lived and worked in Barcelona, Spain. His books have been translated into many languages.

Mantra, a portrait of Mexico City ca. 2000, reveals the deep influence of science fiction novels (Philip K. Dick in particular), movies (Stanley Kubrick) and TV shows (The Twilight Zone). According to Jonathan Lethem, "he's a kaleidoscopic, open-hearted, shamelessly polymathic storyteller, the kind who brings a blast of oxygen into the room."

He was a close friend of the late Chilean writer Roberto Bolaño.

== Works ==
- Historia Argentina (1991)
- Vidas de santos (1993)
- Trabajos Manuales (1994)
- Esperanto (1995)
- La velocidad de las cosas (1998)
- Mantra (2001)
- Jardines de Kensington (2003). Kensington Gardens, trans. Natasha Wimmer (Farrar Straus Giroux, 2006)
- El fondo del cielo (2009). The Bottom of the Sky, trans. Will Vanderhyden (Open Letter, 2018).
- La parte inventada (2014). The Invented Part, trans. Will Vanderhyden (Open Letter, 2017).
- La parte soñada (2017). The Dreamed Part, trans. Will Vanderhyden (Open Letter, 2019).
- La parte recordada (2019). The Remembered Part, trans. Will Vanderhyden (Open Letter, 2022).
- Melvill (2022). Melvill, trans. Will Vanderhyden (Open Letter, 2024).
- El estilo de los elementos (2024)
- El Pequeño Gatsby: Apuntes para la teoría de una gran novela (2025)

== Awards and honors ==
In 2017, Rodrigo Fresán received the prestigious Prix Roger Caillois.

In 2018, The Invented Part won the Best Translated Book Award.

In 2025, Melvill won the 2024 Big Other Book Award for Translation.

In 2025, Melvill won the Republic of Consciousness Prize US and Canada 2024.
