= The Tango Singer =

2004 novel by Tomás Eloy Martínez

- Author: Tomás Eloy Martínez
- Original title: El cantor de tango
- Translator: Anne McLean
- Language: Spanish
- Published: 2004 (Planeta) (Spanish); 2004 (Bloomsbury USA)
- Publication place: Argentina
- Pages: 246
- ISBN: 9504911986

The Tango Singer is a novel by Tomás Eloy Martínez, which was translated to English by Anne McLean. The plot about a New York student that travels to Buenos Aires in 2001, amid the riots of the time, and searches for a tango singer.
