= Memoirs of an Anti-Semite =

Novel by Gregor von Rezzori

- First edition (German)
- Author: Gregor von Rezzori
- Original title: Erinnerungen eines Antisemiten
- Translator: Joachim Neugroschel
- Language: German
- Genre: Novel
- Publisher: New York Review Books
- Publication date: 1979 in Germany; 1981 in United States
- Publication place: Germany
- English publication date: 1981 (Viking); 2007 (NYRB)
- Media type: Print
- Pages: 320
- ISBN: 9781590172469

Memoirs of an Anti-Semite (German: Erinnerungen eines Antisemiten) is a novel by Gregor von Rezzori. Originally published in Germany in 1979, and translated into English by Joachim Neugroschel in 1981.

A section of the novel was published in a 1969 issue of The New Yorker. It was reissued by New York Review Books in 2007.

== Plot ==
The novel's protagonist is known only as Gregor and shares other similarities to Rezzori, most notably being the son of an Austro-Hungarian aristocratic family in decline. The plot is arranged into five sections, and follows Gregor as he revisits his past from his childhood to middle-age. As Germany succumbs to Nazism, Gregor finds his complicated feelings for the Jewish friends and lovers are in conflict with the hatred his country directs at them. His passive, apolitical nature ultimately is at tragic odds with the horrors happening around him.

== Literary significance and reception ==
Reviewing the English translation in 1981, Christopher Lehmann-Haupt wrote, "Yet it is not alone for the vividness of its settings and characters that we attend to 'Memoirs of an Anti-Semite.' We also savor the sound of the author's voice, an extraordinary blend of bitter self-denigration and sweet recollection."

Stanley Kauffmann, also reviewing the book in 1981 for The New York Times, went further with his praise: "It is as irrelevant to argue with Mr. von Rezzori's values as with Ferdinand Celine's or Knut Hamsun's. He is not of their stature, but he is an artist, devilishly honest, stubborn, the creator and the created of an art work about a survivor. It is through Mr. von Rezzori's art, rather than through any vanity or apology of Gregor's, that we are enlightened. Most of the millions who share Mr. von Rezzori's views don't have even the ability to face them as he does, let alone the gifts to reveal them with such disturbing, defiant clarity."

In a retrospective review of the 2007 reissued edition, Christopher Hitchens said: "Writing as he did from the wreckage of postwar Europe, Gregor von Rezzori could claim the peculiar distinction of being one of the few survivors to treat this ultimate catastrophe in the mild language of understatement. This is what still gives his novel the power to shock."

Greg Jackson, author of Prodigals, wrote of the book: "Unsparing in its presentation of the convenient attitudes that sanction the vilest regimes, Memoirs turns self-implication into a subtle and ferocious ethic and teaches that none of us is free from casual, dangerous moral lapses."
