= Montano's Malady =

2002 novel by Enrique Vila-Matas

- Author: Enrique Vila-Matas
- Original title: El mal de Montano
- Translator: Jonathan Dunne
- Language: Spanish
- Publisher: Editorial Anagrama
- Publication date: 2002
- Publication place: Spain
- English publication date: 1 May 2007

Montano's Malady (Spanish: El mal de Montano) is a 2002 novel by the Spanish writer Enrique Vila-Matas. It has also been published in English as Montano.

== Plot ==
The writer Jose Cardoso Pires is obsessed with literature. As he travels around Europe and suffers from writer's block, reality and fiction merge in his mind. The book consists of several distinct parts: a short story by the main character, the story of the short story's creation, a biographical dictionary of literary influences, and an angry account of how the narrator was betrayed by his wife and by a friend.

== Reception ==
Publishers Weekly called the book an "inventive novel" clearly influenced by Jorge Luis Borges. The critic wrote that exhaustion caused by the literary form is a deliberate theme, but that this "doesn't save the book from its own devices".

The book received the Premio Herralde.
