= Susana Rotker =

- Born: 3 July 1954; Caracas, Venezuela
- Died: 27 November 2000 (aged 46); Piscataway, New Jersey, United States
- Education: University of Maryland
- Occupations: Journalist, writer
- Spouse: Tomás Eloy Martínez
- Awards: Casa de las Américas Prize (1991)

Susana Rotker (3 July 1954 – 27 November 2000) was a Venezuelan journalist, columnist, essayist, and writer.

== Biography ==
The daughter of Jewish immigrants, Susana Rotker graduated from Andrés Bello Catholic University in Caracas in 1975, was an assistant professor at the University of Buenos Aires, and received a doctorate in Hispanic literature from the University of Maryland in 1989. She was a professor of Latin American literature and director of the Rutgers Center for Hemispheric Studies in New Jersey.

She was a noted film critic in her column "La gran ilusión" in the Caracas newspaper El Nacional.

Around 1979, she met the Argentine intellectual Tomás Eloy Martínez exiled in Venezuela, with whom she had a daughter Sol Ana in 1986, and with whom she lived until the traffic accident that cost Rotker her life in 2000. She resided in Highland Park, New Jersey.

== Books ==
- Isaac Chocron y Elisa Lerner: Los Transgresores De La Literatura Venezolana Reflexiones Sobre La Identidad Judía, 1991, ISBN 9802530778
- Bravo Pueblo: Poder, Utopia Y Violencia, Fondo Editorial Nave Va., ISBN 9806481135
- Ensayistas De Nuestra América, Editorial Losada, ISBN 9500304880, 9789500304887
- Ciudadanías del miedo, Nueva Sociedad, Caracas, 2000, 249 pp., ISBN 980-317-175-5
- The Memoirs of Fray Servando Teresa de Mier, Oxford University Press
- The American Chronicles of Jose Marti: Journalism and Modernity in Spanish America, ISBN 0874519020
- La invención de la crónica, Fondo de cultura económica, ISBN 9789681678296, 968167829X
- Citizens of Fear: Urban Violence in Latin America, Rutgers University Press, ISBN 9780813530352
- Captive Women: Oblivion and Memory in Argentina, Minneapolis: University of Minnesota Press, 2002, 236 pp., ISBN 0-8166-4030-0

== Awards ==
In 1991 she received the Casa de las Américas Prize for her work La invención de la crónica about José Martí.

She was a Guest Scholar at the Woodrow Wilson International Center in 1997.
