= Prix Roger Caillois =

- Description: Annual literary prize awarded to a Latin American author, a French author, and for an essay
- Country: France
- Presented by: PEN Club (France), Maison de l'Amérique latine, and the Society of readers and friends of Roger Caillois

The prix Roger Caillois is an annual literary prize established in 1991 in partnership with the PEN Club in France and the Maison de l'Amérique latine as well as the Society of readers and friends of Roger Caillois, awarded to both a Latin American and a French author. Since 2007, the prix Roger Caillois for essay comes in addition to these two prizes.

The prize is awarded in December.

== Laureates ==
Year	Category	Winner
2025	Latin American authors	Eduardo Berti
2025	French-speaking authors	Béatrice Bonhomme
2025	Essays	Lakis Proguidis
2024	Latin American authors	Samanta Schweblin
2024	French-speaking authors	René Depestre
2024	Essays	Martin Rueff
2023	Latin American authors	Martín Caparrós
2023	French-speaking authors	Laura Alcoba
2023	Essays	Guillaume Métayer
2022	Latin American authors	Not awarded
2022	French-speaking authors	Not awarded
2022	Essays	Not awarded
2021	Latin American authors	Not awarded
2021	French-speaking authors	Not awarded
2020	Latin American authors	Not awarded
2020	French-speaking authors	Not awarded
2020	Essays	Not awarded
2019	Latin American authors	Fabio Morábito
2019	French-speaking authors	Jacques Réda
2019	Essays	Not awarded
2018	Latin American authors	Milton Hatoum
2018	French-speaking authors	Philippe Lançon
2018	Essays	Jean-Christophe Bailly
2017	Latin American authors	Rodrigo Fresán
2017	French-speaking authors	Patrick Deville
2017	Essays	Jean-François Billeter
2016	Latin American authors	Chico Buarque
2016	French-speaking authors	Régis Debray
2016	Essays	Alain Corbin
2016	Translation	Jacques Ancet
2015	Latin American authors	Eduardo Halfon
2015	French-speaking authors	Jean-Paul Iommi-Amunategui
2015	Essays	Jean-Paul Demoule
2014	Latin American authors	César Aira
2014	French-speaking authors	Chantal Thomas
2014	Essays	Jean-Yves Jouannais
2013	Latin American authors	Cristina Rivera Garza
2013	French-speaking authors	Marcel Cohen
2013	Essays	Régis Boyer
2013	Special centenary prize	Silvia Baron Supervielle
2012	Latin American authors	Juan Gabriel Vásquez
2012	French-speaking authors	Christian Garcin
2012	Essays	Michel Pastoureau
2011	Latin American authors	Leonardo Padura Fuentes
2011	French-speaking authors	Pierre Pachet
2011	Essays	Jean-Pierre Dupuy
2010	Latin American authors	Elsa Cross
2010	French-speaking authors	François Maspero
2010	Essays	Jacqueline Risset
2009	Latin American authors	Roberto Bolaño
2009	French-speaking authors	Pierre Bergounioux
2009	Essays	Paul Veyne
2008	Latin American authors	Ricardo Piglia
2008	French-speaking authors	Roger Grenier
2008	Essays	Serge Gruzinski
2007	Latin American authors	Alan Pauls
2007	French-speaking authors	Éric Chevillard
2007	Essays	Maurice Olender
2006	Latin American authors	Sergio Pitol
2004	Latin American authors	Alberto Manguel
2004	French-speaking authors	Michel Braudeau
2003	Latin American authors	Carlos Fuentes
2003	French-speaking authors	Jean Bottéro
2002	Latin American authors	Mario Vargas Llosa
2002	French-speaking authors	Gérard Macé
2001	Latin American authors	Blanca Varela
2001	French-speaking authors	Michel Waldberg
2000	French-speaking authors	François Cheng
1999	Latin American authors	Haroldo de Campos
1999	French-speaking authors	Alain Jouffroy
1998	French-speaking authors	Kenneth White
1997	Latin American authors	Homero Aridjis
1996	French-speaking authors	Gilles Lapouge
1995	Latin American authors	Adolfo Bioy Casares
1994	French-speaking authors	Pierre Gascar
1993	Latin American authors	Álvaro Mutis
1992	French-speaking authors	Jean-Marie Lee Sidaner
1991	Latin American authors	José Donoso
1991	French-speaking authors	Édouard Glissant
