= The Sound of Things Falling =

2011 novel by Juan Gabriel Vásquez

- Author: Juan Gabriel Vásquez
- Original title: El ruido de las cosas al caer
- Language: Spanish
- Genre: Political Thriller, Literary Realism
- Published: September 21, 2011 Alfaguara
- Publication place: Colombia
- Media type: Print (hardback & paperback), e-book

The Sound of Things Falling (Spanish: El ruido de las cosas al caer) is the third novel of Colombian author Juan Gabriel Vásquez. Originally published in Spanish in 2011, the book explores the corrosive effects of the Colombian drug trade on private lives, civil society, and government. It won the 2011 Alfaguara Prize. An English translation by Anne McLean was released in 2013 and the novel won the 2014 International Dublin Literary Award.

== Synopsis ==
The Sound of Things Falling is the story of a law professor named Antonio Yammara, who narrates the novel. Scenes switch between the 1990s Bogotá, where everything is falling apart as the result of the drug wars, and the past where the drug trade seemed interwoven into everyone's lives.

The text begins with Yammara giving a brief description of his early life. He began his career as a professor, who met Aura in one of his classes. She exchanged sexual favors with Antonio in exchange for higher grades in his classes and fell pregnant. Antonio frequents a local pool hall, in which he meets ex-con Ricardo Laverde. They begin playing pool together, and Antonio quickly becomes interested in the man's mysterious past. Although Antonio claims that he and Ricardo are not friends, the nature of their relationship quickly becomes closer. Ricardo begins to confide in Antonio. Upon receiving a mysterious cassette, Ricardo sets out to find a cassette player.

He listens to the tape and becomes distraught. He begins walking quickly down the street, with Antonio in close pursuit. As they are drawing near the pool hall, a motorbike descends from the curb and guns them down. Ricardo is killed and Antonio badly injured. After the accident, Antonio becomes fixated upon Ricardo's life and withdraws from all other aspects of existence. His relationship with Aura deteriorates quickly, and he becomes afraid of the area close to the pool hall.

He is contacted by Ricardo's daughter Maya, who knows much of her estranged father's story. Antonio leaves home without telling Aura in an attempt to chase this lead. He learns that Ricardo was a pilot who was caught smuggling drugs into the United States and given a 19-year jail sentence. Maya's mother had returned to her native United States when Maya turned 18. She died in a plane crash when attempting to visit Maya and Ricardo after he got out of jail.

As the novel progresses, Antonio and Maya's relationship takes a sexual turn. Antonio had not told Maya about his family back in Bogota. As the text ends, Antonio returns home and finds that Aura has left him, taking their baby with her.

Vásquez wrote The Sound of Things Falling to explore how the corrosive effects of the drug trade affect those not involved in it, but who live in areas where drug cartels exercise considerable power and terrorism. He drew on his own personal experience, "remembering for the first time what it was like to grow up during the drug wars."

While writing, he realized "I was doing something which hadn't been done before. We had all grown up used to the public side of the drug wars, to the images and killings ... but there wasn't a place to go to think about the private side ... How did it change the way we behaved as fathers and sons and friends and lovers, how did it change our private behavior?"

== Publication ==
El ruido de las cosas al caer was published in Spanish in 2011. It was subsequently translated into English by Anne McLean and published by Riverhead Books in 2013.

== Reception ==
Writing for The New York Times, Edmund White called The Sound of Things Falling a "gripping novel, absorbing right to the end". He described it as a "brilliant" work featuring "the bitter poetry of Bogotá and the hushed intensity of young married love" and "well imagined, original and rounded" characters. Also writing for The New York Times, Dwight Garner remarks "Vásquez is an estimable writer. His prose ... is literate and dignified." He said that parts of the book "quickens beautifully and sweeps us aloft" but at other times it is "remote, portentous, burped shut". He blamed translation for some awkward metaphors and said Vásquez is a talented writer but "sometimes seems more interested in poetic generalities than in squirming people."

== Awards ==
El ruido de las cosas al caer won the 2011 Alfaguara Prize.

In 2014, the English translation of The Sound of Things Falling won the International Dublin Literary Award, at €100,000 one of the world's richest literary awards. It was nominated for the prize by the Biblioteca Daniel Cosío Villegas, one of 150 libraries across 38 countries that provide the annual nomination list. The judging panel called the novel a "consummate literary thriller" with "a masterly command of layered time periods, spiraling mysteries and a noir palette". Vásquez won 75% of the €100,000 prize, with the other 25% going to McLean. Vásquez said he would use the prize to keep reading and writing books.

He is the first South American to win the prize. The Sound of Things Falling is the second novel originally written in Spanish to win the prize. The first was the Spanish novel A Heart So White, by Javier Marias.
