= Eduardo Halfon =

Guatemalan writer

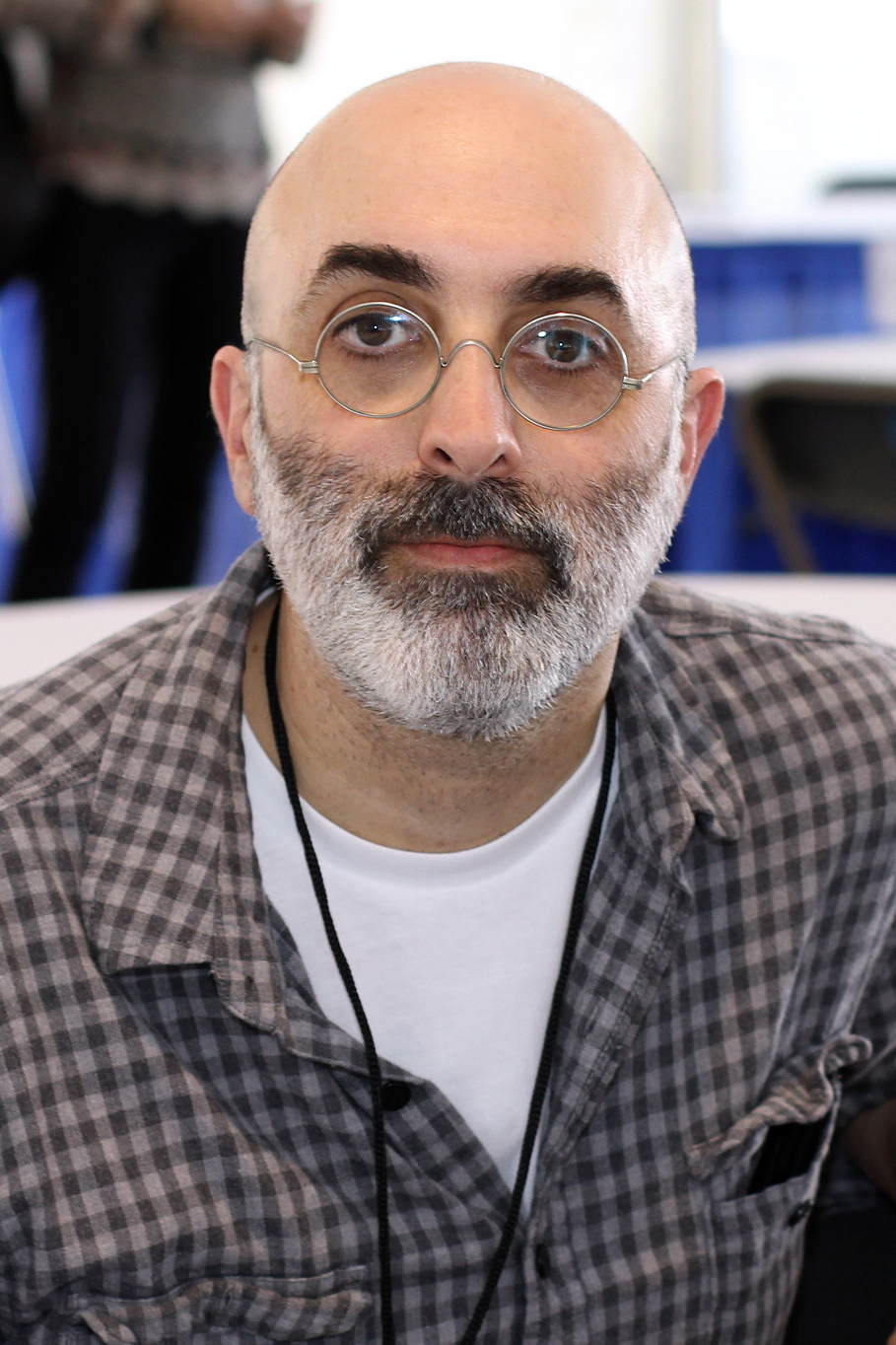
Halfon at the 2018 Texas Book Festival

Eduardo Halfon (born 1971) is a Guatemalan writer.

== Career ==
Eduardo Halfon was born in Guatemala City, moved to the United States at the age of ten, went to school in South Florida, studied industrial engineering at North Carolina State University, and then returned to Guatemala to teach literature for eight years at Universidad Francisco Marroquín. Named one of the best young Latin American writers by the Hay Festival of Bogotá, he is also the recipient of a Guggenheim Fellowship, Roger Caillois Prize, José María de Pereda Prize for the Short Novel, and Guatemalan National Prize in Literature. He is the author of fifteen books published in Spanish and four novels published in English: Mourning, winner of the Edward Lewis Wallant Award and the International Latino Book Award, finalist for the Kirkus Prize and Balcones Fiction Prize, and long listed for the PEN Translation Prize; Monastery, long-listed for the Best Translated Book Award; The Polish Boxer, a New York Times Editors’ Choice selection and finalist for the International Latino Book Award; and Canción, longlisted for the Dublin Literary Award. In 2019, Halfon lived in Paris and held a fellowship from Columbia University. He moved to Berlin in 2021, as a fellow at the Berlin Institute for Advanced Study.

== Published works ==
- Esto no es una pipa, Saturno (Alfaguara 2003, Punto de Lectura 2007)
- De cabo roto (Littera Books 2003)
- El ángel literario (Anagrama 2004, Semifinalist of the Herralde Prize for Novel)
- Siete minutos de desasosiego (Panamericana Editorial 2007)
- Clases de hebreo (AMG 2008)
- Clases de dibujo (AMG 2009, XV Café Bretón y Bodegas Olarra Literary Prize)
- El boxeador polaco (Pre-Textos 2008)
- La pirueta (Pre-Textos 2010, XIV José María de Pereda Prize for Short Novel)
- Mañana nunca lo hablamos (Pre-Textos 2011)
- Elocuencias de un tartamudo (Pre-Textos 2012)
- Monasterio (Libros del Asteroide 2012)
- Signor Hoffman (Libros del Asteroide 2015)
- Duelo (Libros del Asteroide 2017)
- Biblioteca bizarra (Jekyll & Jill 2018)
- Canción (Libros del Asteroide 2021)
- Un hijo cualquiera (Libros del Asteroide 2022)
- Tarántula (Libros del Asteroide 2024)
- La nutria verde (Tapioca Stories 2026)

== Works Translated into English ==
- The Polish Boxer (Bellevue Literary Press, Pushkin Press, 2012)
- Monastery (Bellevue Literary Press, 2014)
- Mourning (Bellevue Literary Press, 2018)
- Canción (Bellevue Literary Press, 2022)
- Tarantula (Bellevue Literary Press, Hamish Hamilton, 2026)
- The green otter (Tapioca Stories 2026)

== Awards ==
- 2007: Named one of the 39 best young Latin American writers by the Hay Festival of Bogotá
- 2010: José María de Pereda Prize for the Short Novel, for The Pirouette (Spain)
- 2011: Guggenheim Fellowship
- 2015: Prix Roger Caillois (France)
- 2018: National Prize in Literature (Guatemala)
- 2018: Prix du Meilleur Livre Étranger, for Mourning (France)
- 2018: Premio de las Librerías de Navarra, for Mourning (Spain)
- 2019: Edward Lewis Wallant Award, for Mourning (U.S.)
- 2019: International Latino Book Award, for Mourning (U.S.)
- 2021: Premio Cálamo, for Canción (Spain)
- 2024: Berman Literature Prize, for Canción (Sweden)
- 2024: Prix Médicis étranger, for Tarantula (France)
- 2025: Premio de la Crítica, for Tarantula (Spain)
