= Bartleby & Co. =

2000 novel by Enrique Vila-Matas

- Author: Enrique Vila-Matas
- Original title: Bartleby y compañía
- Translator: Jonathan Dunne
- Language: Spanish
- Publisher: Editorial Anagrama
- Publication date: 1 February 2000
- Publication place: Spain
- English publication date: 2004
- Pages: 184
- ISBN: 978-84-339-2449-0

Bartleby & Co. (Spanish: Bartleby y compañía) is a 2000 novel by the Spanish writer Enrique Vila-Matas.

== Plot ==
A Spanish office worker wants to be a writer but struggles to follow up his obscure first book. He takes a sick leave and starts to write footnotes to a non-existing text. He comments on writers whose careers stalled, such as Herman Melville, Robert Walser, Felipe Alfau and J. D. Salinger. He turns the improductive central characters from Melville's "Bartleby, the Scrivener" and Hugo von Hofmannsthal's Letter from Lord Chandos into role models. He goes through various reasons to not write.

== Reception ==
Kirkus Reviews called the book a "wry, mind-bending delight" and associated its literary mode with Jorge Luis Borges and Italo Calvino. Mark Sanderson of The Guardian called the book original and "a postmodern paradox, something out of nothing" which with its literary references will make almost anyone "feel woefully illiterate - but then that is part of the game".
