= Gregor von Rezzori =

Austrian-born author and actor

- Born: May 13, 1914; Czernowitz, Bukovina, Austria-Hungary
- Died: April 23, 1998 (aged 83); Reggello, Florence, Italy
- Occupations: Writer, actor
- Writing career
- Genres: Novels, plays, screenplays
- Notable work: Memoirs of an Anti-Semite

Signature
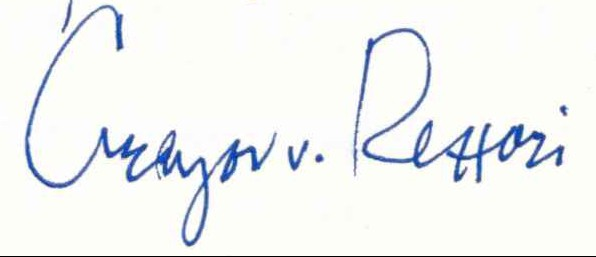

Gregor von Rezzori (German pronunciation: [ʁɛˈtsoːʁi]; 13 May 1914 – 23 April 1998), born Gregor Arnulph Herbert Hilarius von Rezzori d'Arezzo, was an Austrian-born, Romanian, Bukovina-German German-language novelist, memoirist, screenwriter, and author of radio plays, as well as an actor, journalist, visual artist, art critic, and art collector.

== Early life and education ==
Gregor von Rezzori was born 13 May 1914 in Czernowitz, capital of the Duchy of Bukovina, then part of Austria-Hungary. He originated from an Italian aristocratic family from the Province of Ragusa, who had settled in Vienna by the mid-18th century. His father was an Austrian civil servant based in Czernowitz. The family remained in the region after it became part of the Romanian Kingdom in 1919, and the young Gregor von Rezzori became a Romanian citizen.

After World War I von Rezzori studied in colleges in Braşov, Fürstenfeld, and Vienna. He began studying mining at the University of Leoben in Austria, then architecture and medicine at the University of Vienna, where he eventually graduated in arts.

== Career ==
In mid-1930 he moved to Bucharest, took up military service in the Romanian Army, and made a living as an artist. In 1938 he moved to Berlin, Germany, where he became active as a novelist, journalist, writer in radio broadcasting, and film production. Given his Romanian citizenship, von Rezzori was not drafted into the Wehrmacht during World War II.

Until the mid-1950s, he worked as a writer at the broadcasting company Nordwestdeutscher Rundfunk. He regularly published novels and stories, as well as working in film production as a screenplay author and actor (starring alongside actors such as Brigitte Bardot, Jeanne Moreau, Anna Karina, Marcello Mastroianni, and Charles Aznavour).

Beginning in the early 1960s, Rezzori lived between Rome and Paris, with sojourns in the United States, eventually settling in Tuscany after his marriage in 1967.

=== Literary works ===
Rezzori began his career as a writer of light novels, but he first encountered success in 1953 with the Maghrebinian Tales, a suite of droll stories and anecdotes from an imaginary land called "Maghrebinia", which reunited in a grotesque and parodic key traits of his multicultural Bukovinian birthplace, of extinct Austria-Hungary and of Bucharest of his youth. Over the years, Rezzori published further Maghrebinian Tales, which increased his reputation of language virtuosity and free spirit, writing with wit, insight and elegance.

Other books, such as The Death of My Brother Abel, Oedipus at Stalingrad, or The Snows of Yesteryear, recording the fading world at the time of the World Wars, have been celebrated for their powerful descriptive prose, nuance and style.

Rezzori first came to the attention of English-speaking readers with the 1969 publication of the story Memoirs of an Anti-Semite in The New Yorker. The novel-length version of Memoirs of an Anti-Semite was published in Germany in 1979, with the English translation followed in 1981. It received enthusiastic reviews from Christopher Lehmann-Haupt and Stanley Kaufmann when originally published. It was reissued by New York Review Books in 2007, and Christopher Hitchens wrote in a retrospective review, "Gregor von Rezzori could claim the peculiar distinction of being one of the few survivors to treat this ultimate catastrophe in the mild language of understatement. This is what still gives his novel the power to shock".

Reissues of The Snows of Yesteryear and An Ermine in Czernopol followed in 2008 and 2012, respectively. In 2019 NYRB published The Death of My Brother Abel and its sequel Cain as a single volume. Elie Wiesel wrote of The Death of My Brother Abel, "If a great novel can be recognized by its obsessions, its characters and, above all, its tone, then The Death of My Brother Abel is unquestionably great. Rezzori addresses the major problems of our time, and his voice echoes with the disturbing and wonderful magic of the true storyteller."

Rezzori's controversial description of Vladimir Nabokov's Lolita as "the only convincing love story of our century" appeared on the cover of the second Vintage International edition of the novel. It was attributed simply to Vanity Fair, the magazine which published Rezzori's original review of the book, and Rezzori was not often credited as the author of the quote.

In his Guide for Idiots through German Society, Von Rezzori also used his noted taste for satire. Although he was not unanimously perceived as a major author in the German-speaking area, his posthumous reception has arguably confirmed him among the most important modern German-language authors.

== Personal life ==
Von Rezzori was a polyglot, fluent in German, Romanian, Italian, Polish, Ukrainian, Yiddish, French, and English.

During his life, Von Rezzori was successively a citizen of Austria-Hungary, Romania, and the Soviet Union, before becoming a stateless person and acquiring Austrian citizenship.

He married Beatrice Monti della Corte in 1967, and the couple lived in Tuscany. Monti della Corte's father was from Lombardy, and her mother an Armenian from Constantinople. She grew up on the island of Capri where she got to know many of the writers and artists who visited or lived on the island, including Alberto Moravia, Elsa Morante, Norman Douglas, and Graham Greene. In 1955 she opened an art gallery in Milan, exhibiting contemporary American art.

Besides writing and performing, Von Rezzori and Monti della Corte were significant art collectors. The couple restored a group of buildings in Tuscany, part of Reggello's Donnini frazione, which they called Santa Maddalena. This became a meeting place for writers and artists and was known for its hospitality. Frequent visitors who liked to work there included Bruce Chatwin, Michael Ondaatje, Robert Hughes, and Bernardo Bertolucci.

Von Rezzori worked at Santa Maddalena until his death there on 23 April 1998.

== Legacy ==
In 2000, the Santa Maddalena Foundation was created as a place where established as well as emerging writers could undertake residencies in order to write.

The Premio Gregor von Rezzori (Gregor von Rezzori Award), is a literary prize awarded at the annual Festival degli Scrittori in Florence.

== Awards ==
- Theodor Fontane Prize (1959)
- Premio Scanno (1987)
- Premio Boccaccio
- Premio Lorenzo Il Magnifico

== Selected works ==
- Flamme, die sich verzehrt (Self-Extinguishing Flame, novel, 1939)
- Rombachs einsame Jahre, (Rombach's Lonely Years, novel, 1942)
- Rose Manzani (novel, 1944)
- Maghrebinische Geschichten (Tales of Maghrebinia, 1953)
- Ödipus siegt bei Stalingrad (Oedipus Prevails at Stalingrad, 1954)
- Männerfibel, (A Primer on Men, 1955)
- An Ermine in Czernopol novel ("The Hussar", 1958) (NYRB Classics) ISBN 9781590173411
- Idiotenführer durch die deutsche Gesellschaft. 1: Hochadel (An Idiot’s Guide through German Society. 1: Upper Nobility, 1962)
- Idiotenführer durch die deutsche Gesellschaft. 2: Adel (An Idiot’s Guide through German Society. 2: Nobility, 1962)
- Bogdan im Knoblauchwald. Ein maghrebinisches Märchen (Bogdan in the Garlic Forest. A Maghrebinian Tale, 1962)
- Idiotenführer durch die deutsche Gesellschaft. 3: Schickeria (An Idiot’s Guide through German Society. 3: Glitterati, 1963)
- Idiotenführer durch die deutsche Gesellschaft. 4: Prominenz (An Idiot’s Guide through German Society. 4: Notables, 1965)
- Die Toten auf ihre Plätze. Tagebuch des Films Viva Maria (The Dead on Their Places. Journal of the Movie 'Viva Maria', 1966)
- 1001 Jahr Maghrebinien. Eine Festschrift (1967)
- Der Tod meines Bruders Abel (The Death of My Brother Abel, novel, 1976 in Germany; 1985 in U.S., reissued in 2019)
- Greif zur Geige, Frau Vergangenheit (Grab the Fiddle, Ms. Yesteryear, novel, 1978)
- Denkwürdigkeiten eines Antisemiten (Memoirs of an Anti-Semite, 1979 in Germany; 1981 in U.S., reissued in 2007)
- Der arbeitslose König. Maghrebinisches Märchen (The Jobless King: A Maghrebinian Tale, 1981)
- Kurze Reise übern langen Weg. Eine Farce (Short Trip on a Long Route: A Farce, 1986)
- Blumen im Schnee – Portraitstudien zu einer Autobiographie, die ich nie schreiben werde. Auch: Versuch der Erzählweise eines gleicherweise nie geschriebenen Bildungsromans
  - The Snows Of Yesteryear, autobiographical essays (NYRB Classics, 1989) ISBN 9781590172810
- Über dem Kliff (Beyond the Cliff, stories, 1991)
- Begegnungen (Encounters, 1992)
- The Orient-Express (novel, 1992)
- Ein Fremder in Lolitaland. Ein Essay (A Stranger in Lolitaland, 1993), first published in English by Vanity Fair
- Greisengemurmel. Ein Rechenschaftsbericht (Old Men's Mutterings: A Statement of Accounts, 1994)
- Italien, Vaterland der Legenden, Mutterland der Mythen. Reisen durch die europäischen Vaterländer oder wie althergebrachte Gemeinplätze durch neue zu ersetzen sind (1996)
- Frankreich. Gottesland der Frauen und der Phrasen. Reisen durch die europäischen Vaterländer oder wie althergebrachte Gemeinplätze durch neue zu ersetzen sind (1997)
- Mir auf der Spur (On My Own Traces, 1997)
- Kain. Das letzte Manuskript (posthumous novel, 2001)
  - Abel and Cain (NYRB Classics) ISBN 9781681373256

== Filmography ==
=== Screenwriter ===
- Kopfjäger von Borneo, 1936
- Under the Stars of Capri, 1953
- Labyrinth, 1959
- Beloved Augustin, 1959
- Storm in a Water Glass (1960)
- Man nennt es Amore, 1961
- Beloved Impostor, 1961
- The Gentlemen, 1965
- A Degree of Murder, 1967

=== Actor ===
- She (1954, directed by Rolf Thiele) (with Marina Vlady, Walter Giller, Nadja Tiller) as Redakteur
- El Hakim (1957, directed by Rolf Thiele) (with O. W. Fischer, Michael Ande, Nadja Tiller) as Lord Avon
- Paprika (1959, directed by Kurt Wilhelm) (with Willy Hagara, Violetta Ferrari) as Tokasz, Ilonas Vater
- Labyrinth (1959, directed by Rolf Thiele) (with Nadja Tiller, Peter van Eyck, Amedeo Nazzari) as Schweizer Zöllner
- Adorable Arabella (1959, directed by Axel von Ambesser) (with Johanna von Koczian, Carlos Thompson, Hilde Hildebrand)
- Das Riesenrad (1961, directed by Géza von Radványi) (with Maria Schell, O. W. Fischer, Adrienne Gessner) as Graf Wallburg
- A Very Private Affair (1962, directed by Louis Malle) (with Brigitte Bardot, Marcello Mastroianni) as Gricha
- Destination Rome (1963, directed by Denys de La Patellière) (with Charles Aznavour, Arletty) as Sir Craven
- Games of Desire (1964, directed by Hans Albin and Peter Berneis) (with Ingrid Thulin, Claudine Auger, Paul Hubschmid)
- Un mari à prix fixe (1965, directed by Claude de Givray) (with Anna Karina, Roger Hanin) as Konrad Reinhoff
- Die Herren (1965, directed by Franz Seitz, Rolf Thiele, Alfred Weidenmann) as Onkel Grischa
- Viva Maria! (1965, directed by Louis Malle, and Jean-Claude Carrière) with Brigitte Bardot, Jeanne Moreau) as Diogène
- Man on Horseback (1969, directed by Volker Schlöndorff) (with David Warner, Anna Karina) as Kunz
- Ein bißchen Liebe (1974, directed by Veith von Fürstenberg) (with Brigitte Berger, Eva Maria Herzig)
- Le beau monde (1981, TV Movie, directed by Michel Polac) (with Fabrice Luchini, Judith Magre) as Eric (final film role)

== See also ==
- Premio Gregor von Rezzori
