= Pierre Gascar =

French writer and journalist

- Born: Pierre Fournier; 13 March 1916; Paris, France
- Died: 20 February 1997 (aged 80); Lons-le-Saunier, France
- Occupation: Writer
- Writing career
- Pen name: Pierre Gascar
- Language: French
- Notable work: Les Bêtes (1953)
- Notable awards: Prix Goncourt (1953)

Pierre Fournier (13 March 1916 – 20 February 1997), better known his pen name Pierre Gascar, was a French journalist, literary critic, writer, essayist and screenwriter.

== Biography ==
Born in Paris in 1916 to a working-class family, Pierre Gascar lived part of his childhood in Périgord after his mother was institutionalised. His troubled childhood would later inspire him to write La Graine and Meilleur de la Vie. Returning to Paris after completing high school, he became involved in left wing politics and began to associate with writers. His imprisonment in a German stalag during the Second World War heavily influenced his writing during that period. In Le temps des Morts, Gascar recounts his time spent working as a gravedigger at the Rava-Ruska prison camp in Ukraine, during which time he was conscripted to track down Jews hiding in the area.

Gascar became a journalist after the end of the war. In 1953, after winning the Prix Goncourt for Les Bêtes and Le temps des morts, he decided to devote himself entirely to his literary work. His writing, characterised by an exploration of the relationship between plants, animals and people, began to gain greater appreciation from the general public. He started to write biographies, focusing on personalities in which he recognised parts of himself, such as his thirst for knowledge, his independence and his feelings of restlessness. Among the figures he wrote about were Humboldt, Buffon and Bernard Palissy. Aside from his biographical work, he took to writing studies of nature, taking a poetic and philosophical approach. Major works of this kind include Le présage, Les sources and Le règne végétal.

The screenplay of Georges Franju's film Les Yeux sans visage (1960) was in large part written by Gascar. Other works include plays, notably Les pas perdus, picture books and prefaces.

After winning the Grand Prix of the Académie Française, he won the Prix Roger Caillois in 1994. Gascar shared Caillois' fascination with the natural world, while however retaining a firm focus on its relationship with human society.

He died in 1997. The majority of his works were published by Éditions Gallimard.

== Works ==
- Les Meubles, Gallimard, Paris, 1949 : 260 p. (ISBN 2-07-022671-9)
- Le visage clos, Gallimard, Paris, 1951 : 224 p. (ISBN 2-07-022672-7)
- Les Bêtes, Gallimard, Paris, Prix Goncourt en 1953, 1978 : 210 p. (ISBN 2-07-029925-2)
- Le temps des morts, Gallimard, Paris, 1953, 1998 (Le rêve russe): 176 p. (ISBN 2-07-022673-5)
- Chine Ouverte, Gallimard, Paris, 1955 : 188 p. (ISBN 2-07-022675-1)
- Les Femmes, Gallimard, Paris, 1955, 1997 : 210 p. (ISBN 2-07-022676-X)
- La graine, Gallimard, Paris, 1955 : 216 p. (ISBN 2-07-022674-3)
- L'herbe des rues, Gallimard, Paris, 1956 : 216 p. (ISBN 2-07-022677-8)
- Les pas perdus, Gallimard, Paris, 1958 : 240 p. (ISBN 2-07-022680-8)
- Voyage chez les vivants, Gallimard, Paris, 1958 : 264 p. (ISBN 2-07-022678-6)
- La barre de corail & Les aveugles de Saint-Xavier, Gallimard, Paris, 1958 : 232 p. (ISBN 2-07-022679-4)
- Soleils, Gallimard, Paris, 1960 : 160 p. (ISBN 2-07-022681-6)
- Le fugitif, Gallimard, Paris, 1961 : 320 p. (ISBN 2-07-022682-4)
- Les moutons de feu, Gallimard, Paris, 1963 : 336 p. (ISBN 2-07-022684-0)
- Le meilleur de la vie, Gallimard, Paris, 1964 : 336 p. (ISBN 2-07-022683-2)
- Les Charmes, Gallimard, Paris, 1965 : 280 p. (ISBN 2-07-022685-9)
- Histoire de la captivité des français en Allemagne (1939–1945), Gallimard, Paris, 1967: 320 p. (ISBN 2-07-022686-7)
- Auto, Gallimard, Paris, 1968 : 108 p. (ISBN 2-07-027023-8)
- Les Chimères, Gallimard, Paris, 1969 : 232 p. (ISBN 2-07-027024-6)
- L'arche, Gallimard, Paris, 1971 : 240 p. (ISBN 2-07-027769-0)
- Rimbaud et la Commune, Gallimard, Paris, 1971 : 192 p. (ISBN 2-07-035229-3)
- Le présage, Gallimard, Paris, 1972 : 192 p. (ISBN 2-07-028270-8)
- Les sources, Gallimard, Paris, 1975 : 272 p. (ISBN 2-07-029230-4)
- Charles VI, le bal des ardents, Gallimard, Paris, 1977 : 280 p. (ISBN 2-07-029751-9)
- Le boulevard du crime, Hachette/Massin, Paris, 1980 : 156 p. (ISBN 2010075129)
- L'ombre de Robespierre, Gallimard, Paris, 1980 : 336 p. (ISBN 2-07-028620-7)
- Les secrets de maître Bernard – Bernard Palissy et son temps, Gallimard, Paris, 1980 : 288 p. (ISBN 2-07-028391-7)
- Le règne végétal, Gallimard, Paris, 1981 : 180 p. (ISBN 2-07-024882-8)
- Gérard de Nerval et son temps, Gallimard, Paris, 1981 : 336 p. (ISBN 2-07-023533-5)
- Buffon, Gallimard, Paris, 1983 : 267 p. (ISBN 2-07-070007-0)
- Le fortin, Gallimard, Paris, 1983 : 176 p. (ISBN 2-07-070008-9)
- Humboldt l'explorateur, Gallimard, Paris, 1985 : 216 p. (ISBN 2-07-070570-6)
- Le diable à Paris, Gallimard, Paris, 1984 : 224 p. (ISBN 2-07-070257-X)
- Pour le dire avec des fleurs, Gallimard, Paris, 1988 168 p. (ISBN 2-07-071385-7)
- Album Les écrivains de la révolution, Gallimard, Paris, 1989 320 p. (ISBN 2-07-011160-1)
- Portraits et Souvenirs, Gallimard, Paris, 1991 : 204 p. (ISBN 2-07-072202-3)
- La friche, Gallimard, Paris, 1993 : 168 p. (ISBN 2-07-073608-3)
- Montesquieu, Flammarion, Paris, 362 p 1988 (ISBN 2-08-066178-7)
- L'homme et l'animal, Albin Michel, 2000, 1986, 1974 (ISBN 2-22-600093-3)
- Du côté de chez Monsieur Pasteur, Paris, Odile Jacob, 1986 (ISBN 978-2-02-009353-8)
- Aïssé, Paris, Actes sud, 1998, 286 p (ISBN 2-74-271858-3)
- Le transsibérien, Paris, Actes sud, 1998, 55 p (ISBN 2-74-271859-1)
- Le bestiaire d'Horvat, Paris, Actes sud, 1995, 55 p (ISBN 2-74-270373-X)
- Ce difficile accord avec le monde, vertiges du présent, Paris, Arthaud, 1962
- Normandie, Paris, Arthaud, 1962, (ISBN 2-70-030216-8)
- La France, Paris, Arthaud, (ISBN 2-70-030469-1)
- La Chine et les chinois, Paris, Arthaud, 1962
- Chambord, Delpire éditeur, 1962
- Le cheveu, ouvrage collectif, Nathan, 1998, (ISBN 978-2-09-754153-6)
- Genève, Champ Vallon, 1993 (ISBN 2-90-352835-7)
- Dans la forêt humaine, Robert laffont, 1992 (ISBN 2-22-102380-3)
- Le gros chène, Robert laffont, 1992 (ISBN 2-22-102381-1)
- Quartier Latin, la mémoire, La table ronde, 1973, (ISBN 2-70-030216-8)
- Toffoli ou la force du destin, Hachette, 1979, 123 p, (ISBN 2-01-006937-4)
- Gescogne, Renaissance du livre, 1999, 128 p (ISBN 2-80-460275-3)

== Critical Studies ==
- André Bernold, "Pierre Gascar. Le silence de la résorption", in La Nouvelle revue Française, n°539, December 1997 (reprinted in Soies brisées, Paris, Editions Hermann, 1999, pp. 123–130).
- EddY Vannerom, "De la steppe au jardin, le végétal dans l'œuvre de Pierre Gascar", in revue MaYak, n°2, Flobecq, Belgique, Autumn 2007.
