= The Anatomy of a Moment =

2009 book by Javier Cercas

- Author: Javier Cercas
- Original title: Anatomía de un instante
- Translator: Anne McLean
- Language: Spanish
- Genre: Non-fiction
- Publication date: 2009

The Anatomy of a Moment (Spanish: Anatomía de un instante) is a 2009 non-fiction book by Javier Cercas, which won the National Prize for Narrative Writing. An English translation by Anne McLean appeared in 2011, and Fitzcarraldo Editions is due to publish a new edition in 2026.

Initially, Cercas writes in the prologue, he had attempted to write a novel about the coup d'état of 23 February 1981. When this proved too awkward, he began to write a non-fiction narrative of the events - events made memorable by the "television images of the braggart moustachioed Lieutenant Colonel Tejero." It is not straight history however, Cercas "enters people's minds and speculates on their motives."

The book focuses on the experiences of Prime Minister Adolfo Suárez, Communist Party leader Santiago Carrillo, and Deputy Prime Minister General Gutiérrez Mellado. They are balanced in the narrative by three key figures involved with the coup—General Milans del Bosch, General Armada and Tejero.

The writer Michael Eaude: "Cercas hangs his enthralling story round the defiance of these three. (...) Suárez becomes the main character in Cercas's book (...) Cercas is a major novelist who has written a fascinating account of a key event in Spain's recent history."

Rubio-Pueyo argues that Anatomía de un instante may have to be considered as a textual materialisation of the so-called Cultura de la Transición ("Culture of the Transition", CT), or as a literary translation of the régimen del 78 ("Regime of '78").
