= Finnegans =

Minnesota-based brewery

- Industry: Alcoholic beverage
- Founded: 2000
- Founder: Jacquie Berglund
- Headquarters: Minneapolis, Minnesota, United States
- Products: Beer
- Website: finnegans.org

Finnegans Brew Co. is a Minnesota-based brewery founded in September 2000, known for donating 100% of its profits back to the community. Proceeds are donated to the Finnegans Community Fund, which focuses on feeding the hungry by working with local food banks and produce growers.

== Beers ==
The company's beers include:

- Finnegans Irish Ale, their flagship ale
- Cluster Truck IPA, an American IPA
- Tipped Cow Farmhouse Ale, a Belgian-inspired Saison style
- East Town Pilsner, a traditional Czech-style Pilsner
- Clocked Out, EOD Unfiltered Wheat
- Tile Factory, Mosaic India Pale Ale
- Armory Laker Blonde
- Brim Reaper, Rye India Pale Ale
- Dead Irish Poet Stout, a Cork-style Extra Stout
- Barrels of Life Series and other limited-edition brews

Finnegans distributes their brews to Minnesota, North and South Dakota, Iowa, and Wisconsin.

== History ==
In 1997, Jacquie Berglund moved to Minnesota. She was offered a job by Kieran Folliard, founder of 2 Gingers Irish Whiskey and Kieran's Irish Pub in Minneapolis, Minnesota, as the director of marketing. While working with Folliard, Berglund decided to begin brewing beer, and to use the profits for a worthy cause. Folliard sold Berglund his part of what at the time was called "Kieran's Irish Potato Ale" for $1, which would eventually become Finnegans' Irish Amber Ale.

The company ran into some problems when the IRS disagreed that a beer company could be a non-profit as their primary work involved no charity. Berglund set up Finnegans as a beer company which donated all profits to the Finnegans Community Fund. She was the only employee of Finnegans up until 2009.

In 2003, brewing moved from the James Page Brewery in Minneapolis to Summit Brewing Company in St. Paul, Minnesota.

In 2007, Finnegans reached $100,000 in donations and expanded outside of Minnesota to Wisconsin and North Dakota. Proceeds were donated to charities working to end the cycle of poverty. Finnegans partners with The Food Group, Great Plains Food Bank, Feeding South Dakota and Hunger Task Force to make an impact in Minnesota, North Dakota, South Dakota and Wisconsin along with local farms throughout the Midwest.

Finnegans celebrated its 10-year anniversary in 2010 and shifted its focus to alleviating hunger. In 2011, Finnegans raised $45,000 in donations for the funding of 6 new farm and food shelf partnerships. That year, Finnegans also fielded a team for the MS150 bicycle ride from Duluth to Minneapolis to raise money for multiple sclerosis. The Finnegans MS150 team has been part of Bike MS ever since and are among the top fundraising teams each year.

In 2013, Finnegans first released its first beer in cans, starting with Irish Amber and Blonde Ale. Since then, a variety of the Finnegan's beers are canned and distributed throughout Minnesota, North Dakota, South Dakota and Wisconsin

In October 2017, Finnegans hired their first head brewer, Ryan Mihm (formerly of New Belgium in Colorado and Allagash Brewing Company in Maine), to guide their craft brewing process.

On March 30, 2017, Finnegans staged the "Chef Food Fight", inviting five Twin Cities Chefs to go head-to-head in a live cook-off featuring Finnegans-inspired recipes. Chef Vincent Francoual of Kierans Irish Pubs was crowned the champion and all proceeds benefited Minnesota FoodShare's March campaign.

In March 2018, the company unveiled Finnegans House to the public in the Elliot Park neighborhood of east downtown Minneapolis. The 17,520 square foot facility includes a brewery, taproom, Finnovation Lab (a social business incubator and community workspace), and a members-only social club and event space called the Brewer's Den.

In October 2020, Finnegans placed in the top twenty IPAs as part of the Alpha King Challenge that were part of the Great American Beer Festival.
