= Ibahernando =

- municipality
- Flag Coat of arms

- Location in Spain.
- Coordinates: 39°19′N 5°55′W
- Country: Spain
- Autonomous community: Extremadura
- Province: Cáceres
- Comarca: Tierra de Trujillo

Government
  - Mayor: Francisco Giraldo Sánchez

Area
  - Total: 77 km^{2} (30 sq mi)
- Elevation: 540 m (1,770 ft)

Population (2025-01-01)
  - Total: 538
  - Density: 7.0/km^{2} (18/sq mi)
- Time zone: UTC+1 (CET)
  - Summer (DST): UTC+2 (CEST)
- Website: Official website

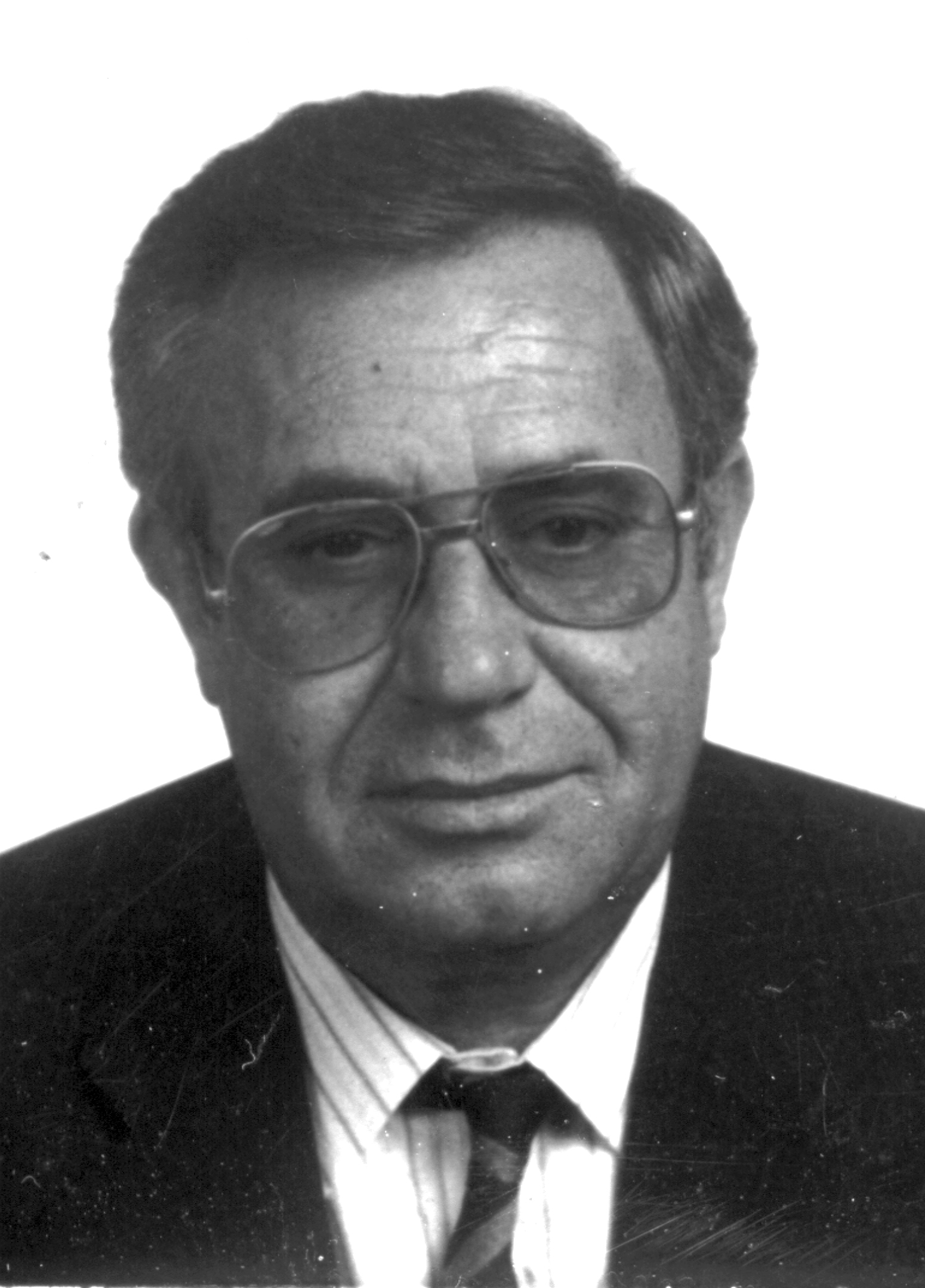
Felix Heras Ruiz, Alcalde 1979-1991

Ibahernando is a municipality located in the province of Cáceres, Extremadura, Spain.

== See also ==
- List of municipalities in Cáceres
