= Enrique Vila-Matas =

Spanish writer (born 1948)

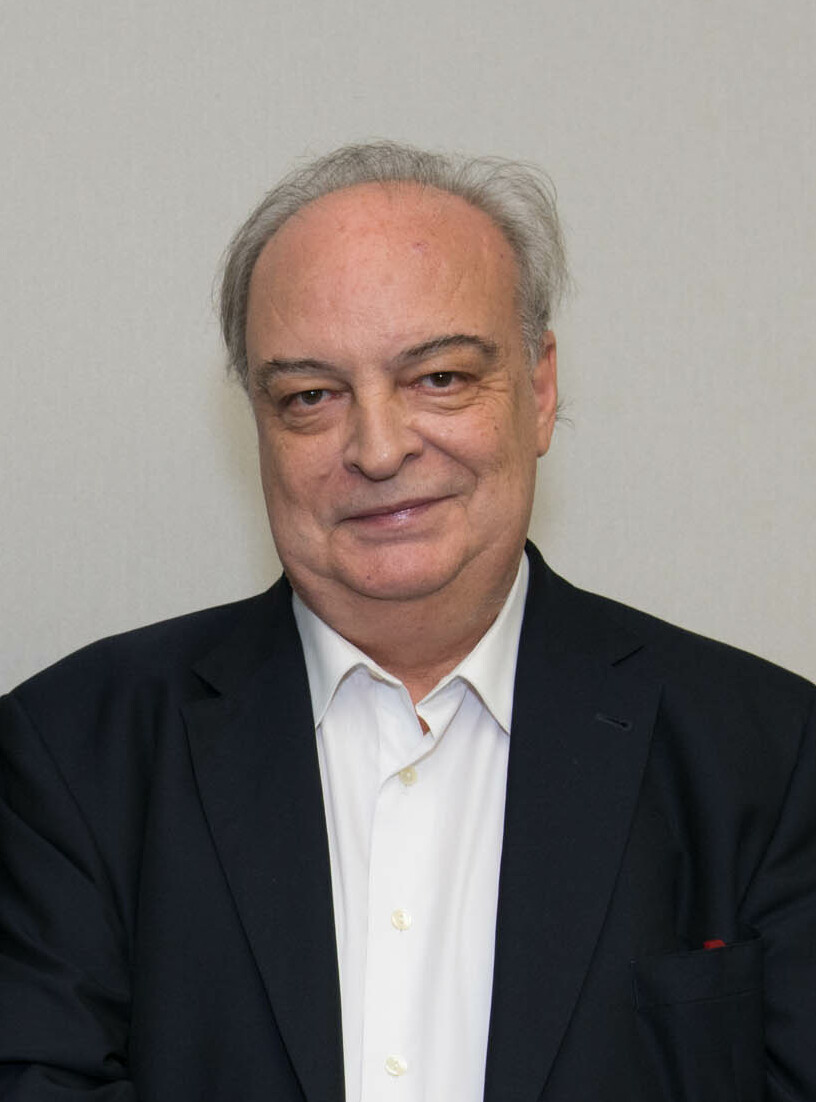
- Born: Enrique Vila-Matas; 31 March 1948 (age 78); Barcelona, Spain
- Occupation: Writer

Enrique Vila-Matas (born 31 March 1948 in Barcelona) is a Spanish writer.

Vila-Matas has written several award-winning books that mix genres and has been branded as one of the most original and prominent writers in the Spanish language. He is frequently mentioned among the favourites to win the Nobel Prize in Literature.

He is a founding Knight of the Order of Finnegans, a group which meets in Dublin every year on 16 June to honour James Joyce and his novel Ulysses.

== Biography ==
Enrique Vila-Matas was born in Barcelona in 1948 to Enrique, who worked in the real-estate business, and Tayo Vila-Mata. When he was twelve, he began writing and later studied law and journalism.

In 1968, he became editor of the film magazine Fotogramas. In 1970, he directed two short films, Todos los jóvenes tristes (All the Sad Youngsters) and Fin de verano (The End of Summer).

In 1971, he did his military service in Melilla, where in the back room of a military-supplies store, he wrote his first novel, Mujer en el espejo contemplando el paisaje. On his return to Barcelona, he worked as a film critic for the magazines Bocaccio and Destino.

Between 1974 and 1976, he lived in Paris in a garret he rented from the writer Marguerite Duras, before returning to Barcelona.

== Literary career ==
Vila-Matas published his first novel, written as a single uninterrupted sentence, in 1973. While living in Paris he wrote his second novel, La asesina ilustrada. His third and fourth books, Al sur de los párpados and Nunca voy al cine, appeared in 1980 and 1982. With the publication of his book Historia abreviada de la literatura portátil in 1985, Vila-Matas began to be recognised.

He then published the short-story collections Una casa para siempre, Suicidios ejemplares and Hijos sin hijos; Recuerdos inventados is an anthology of his best stories. His following works were novels, including Lejos de Veracruz, Extraña forma de vida, El viaje vertical, Bartleby & Co. and Montano's Malady, among others. In 1992, he published a collection of articles and literary essays under the title El viajero más lento, which he followed up in 1995 with El traje de los domingos. Other books containing literary essays include Para acabar entendamos nada (2003, Chile), El viento ligero en Parma (2004, Mexico; re-published in Spain, 2008), and And Pasavento ya no estaba (2008, Argentina). Never Any End to Paris (2003) tells of his Parisian experiences. In 2005, Doctor Pasavento came out, a book about the subject of disappearance and "the difficulty of being nobody". This book closes his meta-literary trilogy on the pathologies of writing (Bartleby, Montano and Pasavento).

In September 2007, Vila-Matas returned to the short story, publishing Exploradores del abismo with Anagrama. In 2008, came Dietario voluble, in which he opts more than ever for a formula that erases the borders between fiction, essay and biography. The book is a literary diary or a kind of guide that allows the reader to glimpse the work's internal structure and combines experiences of reading and life, personal memory, and an essayist's literary ideas. It was followed by Ella era Hemingway / No soy Auster, two short texts published by Alfabia in the Cuadernos Collection.

In 2010, he returned once more to the novel with Dublinesca, a book that deals with a publisher in crisis, and has since published several novels including Kassel no invita a la lógica (2014, The Illogic of Kassel), Marienbad electrique (2015) and Mac y su contratiempo (2017, Mac and His Problem), as well as two short-story collections. Described as "a masterpiece of metafiction", the English translation of Mac and His Problem was longlisted for the 2020 International Booker Prize.

== Literary style ==
Vila-Matas' books mix different genres and typically blur the boundaries between essay and fiction in a style that the author himself has defined as "narrated thought". Metafiction, intertextuality, humour, wit, irony and autobiographical self-reflection are integral parts of his writing that has been described as "an intense and witty textual delirium that has made him one of the most original and celebrated writers in the Spanish language."

== Distinctions and prizes ==
Vila-Matas is a knight of the French Legion of Honour, and has an honorary doctorate from the University of the Andes, Venezuela. He has won the Ciudad de Barcelona prize and the Venezuelan Rómulo Gallegos Prize (2001); the Meilleur Livre Étranger prize and the Fernando Aguirre-Libralire prize (2002); the Herralde prize, the Nacional de la Crítica prize, the Médicis-Étranger Prize, the Círculo de Críticos de Chile prize (2003), the Internazionale Ennio Flaiano prize (2006), the Fundación José Manuel Lara prize 2006, and the Real Academia Española prize 2006.

In 2007, he won the Elsa Morante literary prize in the category Scrittori del Mondo, which each year honours a great foreign writer. In 2009, he received the Internazionale Mondello prize for the novel Dottor Pasavento, translated into Italian by Feltrinelli. In 2011, he received the Bottari Lattes Grinzane Prize (Italy) the Prix Jean Carrière (France) and the Leteo Award (Spain) for Dublinesque. In 2012, he received the Argital Award Bilbao City for Air of Dylan and the Premio Gregor von Rezzori for the Italian translation of Exploradores del abismo (Esploratori dell’abisso).

In 2014, he won the Premio Formentor de las Letras. In 2015, he won the FIL Literary Award in Romance Languages valued at $150,000. In 2016, he received the National Award of Catalonia.

He is a founding member of the Order of Finnegans, which takes its name from a pub in Dalkey, Ireland, although there are those who believe it also comes from James Joyce's last novel, Finnegans Wake. The knights of the Order of Finnegans must venerate James Joyce's novel Ulysses and, if possible, attend Bloomsday, June 16, each year in Dublin on the sixteenth of June. This is a long day that culminates, at dusk, at the Martello tower in Sandycove (where the novel begins) with participants reading sections from Ulysses and then walking to Finnegan's pub in the neighbouring village of Dalkey. The other four founding members are Eduardo Lago, Jordi Soler, Antonio Soler and Malcolm Otero Barral.

His most recent novel is Montevideo, a metafiction work which reflects on writing and interconnected hotel rooms, such as one in Montevideo at Cervantes hotel that has been previously mentioned in the two short stories by Adolfo Bioy Casares and Julio Cortázar La puerta condenada.

His work has so far been translated into thirty languages, including French, English, German, Italian, Russian, Japanese, Arabic, Greek, Serbian, Swedish, Dutch, Hungarian, Hebrew, Turkish, Norwegian, Romanian, Polish, Korean, Catalan, Slovenian, Czech, Bulgarian, Finnish, Danish, Lithuanian, Slovak, Mandarin, Portuguese and Croatian.

Of his novel Dublinesque, Jacqueline McCarrick of The Times Literary Supplement wrote "...Vila-Matas has created a masterpiece".

== Bibliography ==
=== Novels ===
- Mujer en el espejo contemplando el paisaje (Tusquets, 1973).
- La asesina ilustrada (Tusquets, 1977. Lumen, 2005).
- Al sur de los párpados (Fundamentos, 1980).
- Impostura (Anagrama, 1984).
- Historia abreviada de la literatura portátil (Anagrama, 1985).
- Recuerdos inventados. Primera antología personal (Anagrama, 1994).
- Lejos de Veracruz (Anagrama, 1995).
- Extraña forma de vida (Anagrama, 1997).
- El viaje vertical (Anagrama, 1999).
- Bartleby y compañía (Anagrama, 2000).
- El mal de Montano (Anagrama, 2002).
- París no se acaba nunca (Anagrama, 2003).
- Doctor Pasavento (Anagrama, 2005).
- Exploradores del abismo (Anagrama, 2007).
- Dietario voluble (Anagrama, 2008).
- Dublinesca (Seix Barral, 2010).
- Perder teorías (Seix Barral, 2010).
- En un lugar solitario. Narrativa 1973-1984 (Mondadori/Debolsillo, 2011).
- Aire de Dylan (Seix Barral, 2012).
- Kassel no invita a la lógica (Seix Barral, 2014).
- Marienbad electrique (Bourgois editeur, 2015).
- Mac y su contratiempo (Seix Barral, 2017)
- Esta bruma insensata (Seix Barral, 2019)
- Montevideo (Seix Barral, 2022)
- Canon de cámara oscura (Seix Barral, 2025)

=== Short-story collections ===
- Nunca voy al cine (Laertes, 1982).
- Una casa para siempre (Anagrama, 1988).
- Suicidios ejemplares (Anagrama, 1991).
- Hijos sin hijos (Anagrama, 1993).
- Chet Baker piensa en su arte. Relatos selectos (Mondadori/Debolsillo, 2011).
- El día señalado [short story] (Nórdica libros, 2015).
- Vampire in Love (New Directions, September 2016).

=== Essays ===
- El viajero más lento (Anagrama, 1992. Edición aumentada: El viajero más lento. El arte de no terminar nada, Seix Barral, 2011).
- El traje de los domingos (Huerga & Fierro, 1995).
- Para acabar con los números redondos (Pre-Textos, 1997).
- Desde la ciudad nerviosa (Alfaguara, 2000. Edición aumentada: Alfaguara, 2004).
- Extrañas notas de laboratorio (Ediciones El otro el mismo/CELARG, 2003. Edición aumentada: Ediciones El otro, el mismo, 2007).
- Aunque no entendamos nada (J. C. Sáez editor, 2003).
- El viento ligero en Parma (México, Sexto Piso, 2004. Madrid, Sexto Piso, 2008).
- Ella era Hemingway / No soy Auster (Ediciones Alfabia, 2008).
- Y Pasavento ya no estaba (Mansalva, 2008).
- Una vida absolutamente maravillosa. Ensayos selectos (Mondadori/De Bolsillo, 2011).
- Fuera de aquí. Conversaciones con André Gabastou (Galaxia Gutenberg, 2013). (Vila-Matas, pile et face, rencontre avec André Gabastou. Paris: Argol éditions, 2010).

=== Works translated into English ===
- A Brief History of Portable Literature (New Directions, 2015). Translated by Anne McLean.
- Bartleby & Co. (New Directions, 2004). Translated by Jonathan Dunne.
- Montano's Malady (New Directions, 2007). Translated by Jonathan Dunne.
- Never Any End to Paris (New Directions, 2011). Translated by Anne McLean.
- Dublinesque (New Directions in USA, Harvill in UK, 2012). Translated by Anne McLean and Rosalind Harvey.
- The Illogic of Kassel (New Directions, 2015). Translated by Anne McLean.
- Because She Never Asked (New Directions, 2015). Translated by Valerie Miles.
- Vampire in Love (New Directions, 2016). Translated by Margaret Jull Costa.
- Mac and his Problem (New Directions, 2019). Translated by Margaret Jull Costa and Sophie Hughes.
- Montevideo (Yale University Press, 2025). Translated by Sophie Hughes and Annie McDermott.
- Camera Obscura (Yale University Press, 2026). Translated by Valerie Miles.

=== Further reading ===
- Andres-Suárez, Irene y Ana Casas (eds.) Enrique Vila-Matas. Madrid: Arco/ Libros, 2007 (Col. «Cuadernos de Narrativa»).
- Heredia, Margarita (ed.) Vila-Matas portátil. Un escritor ante la crítica. Barcelona: Candaya, 2007. [Includes a DVD: Café con Shandy (30’), a talk between Vila-Matas and Juan Villoro].
- Salas, Lisbeth. Infinitamente serio. Caracas: La cámara escrita, 2009.
- Pozuelo Yvancos, José María. Figuraciones del yo en la narrativa. Javier Marías y E. Vila-Matas. Valladolid: Universidad de Valladolid, Junta de Castilla y León, 2010. (Cátedra Miguel Delibes).
- Ríos Baeza, Felipe A. (ed.) Enrique Vila-matas. Los espejos de la ficción. México: Ediciones Eón/Benemérita Universidad Autónoma de Puebla, 2012.
- Badia, Alain, Anne-Lise Blanc y Mar García (eds.) Geographies du vertige dans l'oeuvre d'Enrique Vila-Matas. Perpignan: Presses universitaires de Perpignan, 2013.
- Carrera, Guillermo. Crítica portátil. La estructura ausente en Doctor Pasavento (una aproximación narratológica). Puebla: Benemérita Universidad Autónoma de Puebla (Instituto de Ciencias Sociales y Humanidades, 2013.
