= Donald Ker =

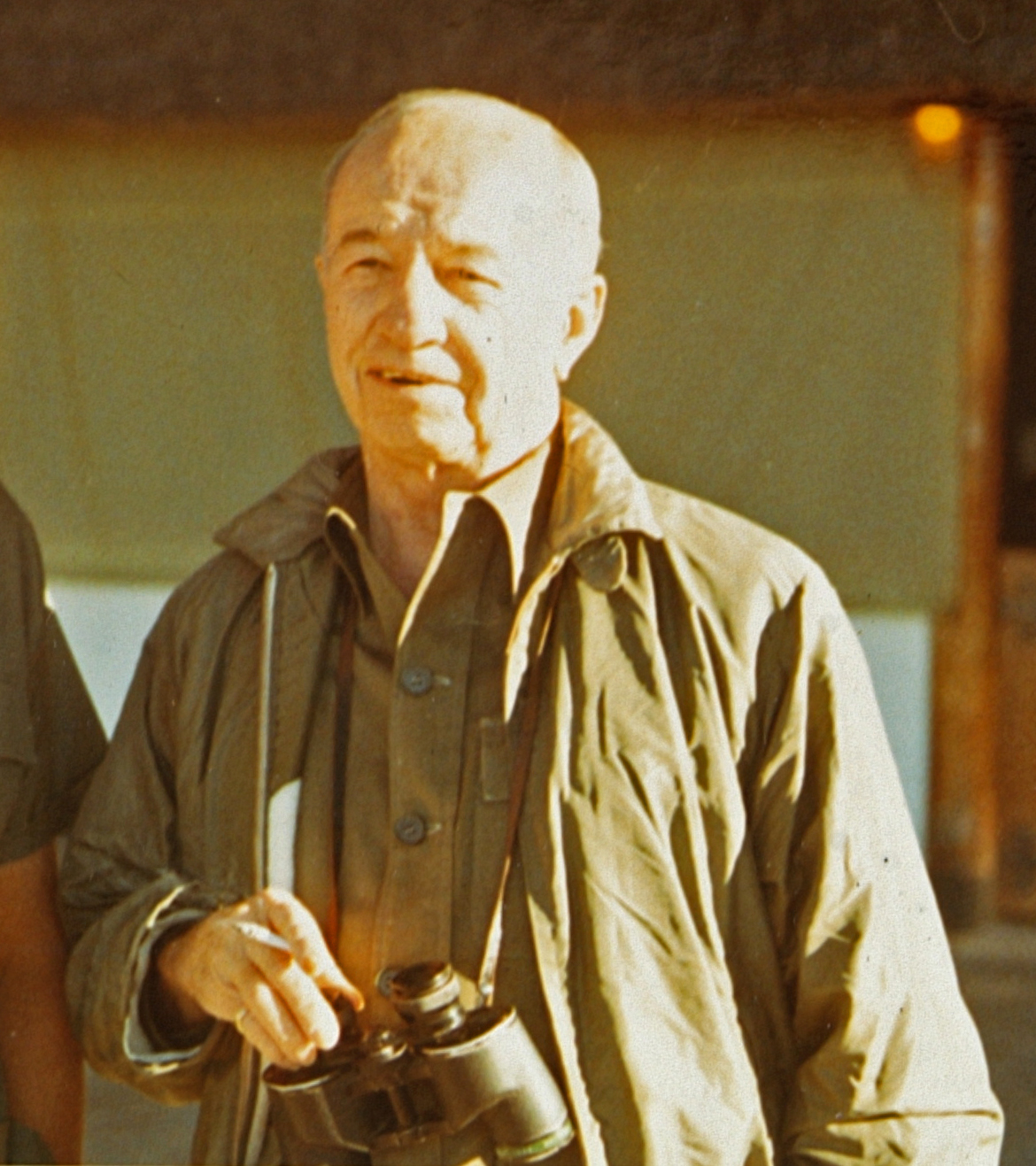
Donald Ker on safari circa 1975

Donald Ker was a famous Kenyan white hunter, safari guide and conservationist of British descent. As a young man he teamed up with Sydney Downey to create Ker and Downey Safaris Ltd., one of the first guide companies to transition from hunting to photographic safaris. He is also known for leading two long expeditions with Edgar Monsanto Queeny for the American Museum of Natural History which resulted in the production of several nature documentaries and in Ker's own dedication to conservation.

== Early years ==
When Ker was six years old his family moved to a coffee plantation in Kenya. He took to hunting early in his life and killed his first lion when still in his teens. Not much later he accompanied Denys Finch Hatton on a safari for the Prince of Wales. He soon joined the safari company Shaw and Hunter Ltd. It was while he worked for Shaw and Hunter that he first encountered Sydney Downey in the Masai Mara. In the beginning the two hunters developed a feud stemming from an incident when both were in the Mara at the same time, and felt the other's hunting party was encroaching on theirs. As time passed the hunted together many times. Throughout the 1930s, the two hunters, Ker and Downey, opened up much of the Masai Mara to hunting. Their first paying safari as Ker and Downey Ltd. was outfitting The Macomber Affair, an adaptation of Ernest Hemingway's The Short Happy Life of Francis Macomber.

== Ker and Downey Ltd. ==
When WWII broke out in 1939 Ker enlisted with British army where he became a scout and partook in campaigns against the Italians in the Ethiopian theatre. After the city of Addis Ababa was reclaimed by the British, he met Downey at a bar, and made plans to form their own safari company after the war. Shortly after, they announced their decision during an "impromptu meeting of the East African Professional Hunters" Association.

Ker and Downey was eventually created after the war in 1946, making it now the world's longest running safari company. Offshoots of the original company were set up in Tanzania, Botswana and the United States. The original main partners were Jack Block, Sydney Downey (Syd) and Donald Ker. Jack Block who owned the Norfolk and Stanley Hotel, Nairobi was the business brain who saw it as his role to keep Downey and Ker out on safari for as many days as possible. The Botswana operation was set up by new partner Harry Selby (hunter), who joined after the huge success of Robert Ruark's Horn of the Hunter which was based on a safari they took together.

Often credited for leading the move from hunting to photographic safaris out, Ker and Downey is famous for having outfitted many movies - from Out of Africa to Gorillas in the Mist and The Constant Gardener. Ker and Downey's first safari, the Macomber Affair had many scenes at Nairobi's oldest hotel, the Stanley Hotel, Nairobi where Ker and Downey had its first offices and was based for many years. Both quiet men, Ker and Downey were nonetheless attractive to both royalty and celebrity. Charles, Prince of Wales and Anne, Princess Royal first saw the Maasai Mara on Ker and Downey safaris, as did Paul Simon, Carrie Fisher and millionaire Constantine Niarchos. Films the company has worked on include Mogambo, with Clark Gable, Ava Gardner and Grace Kelly; King Solomon's Mines with Stewart Granger; The Snows of Kilimanjaro with Gregory Peck, Susan Heyward and Ava Gardner, Hatari! starring John Wayne, Out of Africa with Robert Redford and Meryl Streep. Cry Freedom, Gorillas in the Mist and The Constant Gardener were also outfitted by the Nairobi-based firm.

One of Ker's most notable clients was the businessman and naturalist Edgar Monsanto Queeny for whom he led two expeditions also associated with the American Museum of Natural History. Queeny's intent was to audio record and film African wildlife and native culture, and produced several documentaries from the footage he took while with Ker, including Indicator Indicator and the Pagan Sudan. Ker and Queeny also worked hard to record the various sounds that lions make by playing back to the lions other lion and hyena sounds to illicit novel responses. In doing this Ker realised that the practice of playing recorded animal sounds to lions and other game "could be misused in hunting," and upon his return to Nairobi managed to get the Game department to amend the hunting laws banning such practices. This event exemplifies Ker's own growing conservationist tendencies. At that point, he and Downey were already leaning towards photographic safaris. Neither had enjoyed killing animals all that much to begin with, preferring instead the thrill of the chase.

Like other Kenyan safari companies, Ker and Downey is closely involved with conservation, donating time and funds to organisations like Olgulului Olorashi in Amboseli and Koiyaki Group Ranch in the Masai Mara.
