= East African Professional Hunter's Association =

The East African Professional Hunter's Association (EAPHA) was an organization of East African white hunters founded in Nairobi, Kenya in 1934. Well known members included Philip Percival, Harry Selby, Sydney Downey and Donald Ker. Their motto was nec timor nec temeritas, or "neither fear nor foolhardiness". The Association formed out of a desire to regulate hunting in the wake of technological developments like the safari vehicle, which had made accessing remote hunting areas much easier. During its existence it was able to accomplish much to conserve East African wildlife and become perhaps one of the most respected societies in the world of its kind. The Association was disbanded in 1977 when Kenya outlawed all big game hunting. The association's official records are held at the University of Florida, with selected photos and typescript documents available online.

== History ==
=== Early years ===
EAPHA was founded on April 12, 1934 by a group of white hunters who had gathered at the Norfolk Hotel in Nairobi Kenya. The founders were worried about the effects of technological developments on the wildlife populations of Kenya and sought to regulate the hunting industry there. For instance, the advances in automobile technology had enabled access to remote wildlife areas. Within the first few years of its existence, the Association managed to get East Africa the most stringent game laws in the world. These laws included protecting the females of each species and banning night hunting and the use of dogs. The sale of game meat was also prohibited, as was the shooting of animals within proximity of watering holes or of safari vehicles. In its early years, it also continued to press authorities to create conservation areas for East African wildlife.

=== 1970s ===
By the 1970s, individual countries had started forming their own hunters' associations, but none rivaled EAPHA in the extremity of its conservationism. EAPHA's members had become quite powerful in local affairs and began pushing even harder at that time to create conservation areas. Two of its members, Sydney Downey and Donald Ker, began to lobby for the establishment of a game reserve that would include the entire Masai Mara triangle, a proposal that Kenya's chief game warden supported. The two also lobbied for a similar reserve across the border in the Serengeti of Tanganyika. Yet despite its work in conservationism, the association was disbanded on the September 26, 1977 when Kenya officially outlawed all hunting within its borders.
