= Sydney Downey =

British-Kenyan professional hunter and safari pioneer

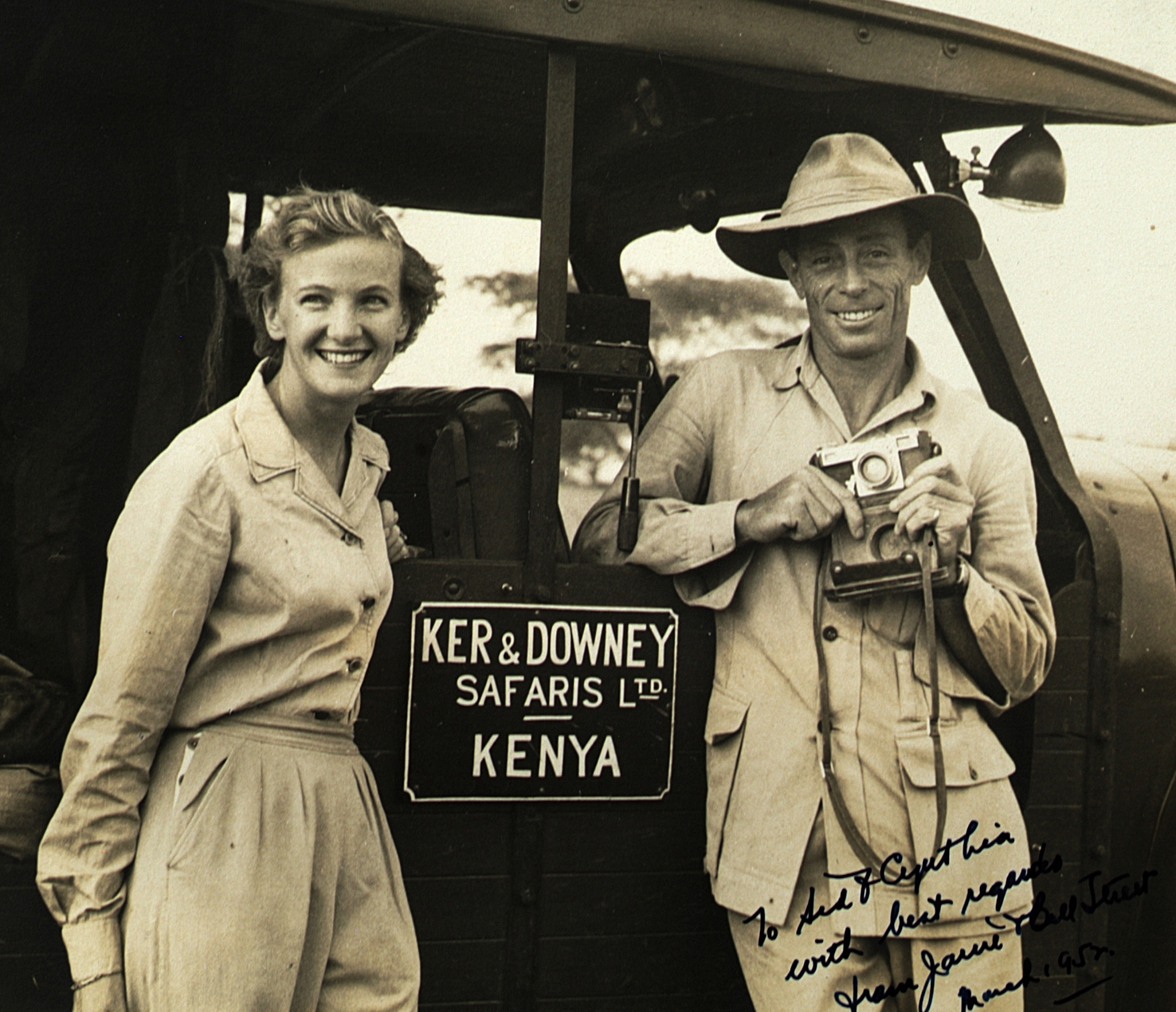
- Syd and Cynthia Downey on safari in the late 1940s in Kenya
- Born: Argentina
- Occupations: Professional hunter and safari pioneer
- Known for: At the forefront of the move away from hunting and towards photographic safaris

Sydney Downey was a British-Kenyan professional white hunter and safari pioneer. Always known as Syd, he learned the trade of guiding safari hunts from an older generation of professional hunters, including his early mentor Philip Percival. He teamed up with Donald Ker to create Ker and Downey Safaris Ltd., a company that was at the forefront of the move away from hunting and towards photographic safaris.

== Early life ==
Downey was born to a British expatriate family ranching cattle in Argentina. He spent most of his early childhood in Argentina, leaving the country for England to attend secondary school. Upon graduating school he sailed to Kenya, where he found a job working on a coffee plantation outside of Nairobi.

== Hunting life ==
Downey became a professional hunter in 1933 when he joined Leslie Tarlton’s Safariland. In the early days with the company, Downey worked with Philip Percival on several safaris as his "second hunter." Percival quickly became Donwey's mentor. Downey soon met Ronald Ker, another Kenyan hunter with whom he developed a rivalry. During the 1930s Ker and Downey were known for having opened up much of the Masai Mara to hunting. However, both hunters took a break from their trade when World War II broke out in 1939, joining the British effort in East Africa against the Italians.

== Ker and Downey Safaris ==
As the war in Africa was winding down the British successfully ousted the Italians from Ethiopia, taking back the city of Addis Ababa. It was at this time that Ker and Downey met again, during an "impromptu meeting of the East African Professional Hunters’ Association," in an Addis Ababa bar. During their meeting Ker pitched Downey on the idea of going into business together as soon as the war ended. When the war ended the pair kept their promises and founded Ker and Downey Safaris. Their first paying safari was The Macomber Affair, starring Gregory Peck and Joan Bennett. They hired some of the most well known East African hunters including Harry Selby. In fact the company eventually became Ker, Downey and Selby Safaris, as Selby expanded the operation down in Botswana. However the partnership with Selby did not last in the end. Ker and Downey had both been moving away from hunting safaris and towards photographic trips, since neither of them particularly enjoyed killing animals, instead preferring the chase. Downey eventually became just as well known for his conservationism as his hunting.
