= Africa Adventure =

1954 American documentary film directed by Robert C. Ruark

- Theatrical poster of film
- Directed by: Robert C. Ruark
- Written by: Robert C. Ruark
- Produced by: Jay Bonafeld
- Narrated by: Robert C. Ruark
- Cinematography: Chester Kronfeld
- Music by: Paul Sawtell
- Production companies: RKO-Pathé; Voyager Productions
- Distributed by: RKO Radio Pictures
- Release date: September 28, 1954 (US)
- Running time: 64 minutes
- Country: United States
- Language: English

Africa Adventure is a 1954 American documentary film which follows a safari around East Africa, led by big-game hunter Robert C. Ruark. Ruark narrated and directed the film, and also wrote the script. Produced by RKO-Pathé, it was distributed by its sister company, RKO Radio Pictures, who premiered the film on September 28, 1954.

== Synopsis ==
Big-game hunter Robert Ruark travels from the United States to Kenya, where he meets other professional hunters, Harry Selby and Andrew Holmbert. They load their vehicles and head first to the village of Isiola, before continuing on further into the interior of Kenya. The safari encounters many of the animals of the African plains, such as rhinoceros, gazelles, guinea fowl and elephants. They meet members of the Rendille-Samburu tribe, and agree to hunt down an elephant which has been causing problems for the tribe. Despite inclement weather, the group tracks the rogue elephant and kills it.

The party spends several weeks hunting and taking pictures, eventually arriving in Uganda, where they run afoul of the authorities, who impound their vehicle. While attempting to replace their truck, Ruark's wife and another hunter, John Sutton, join the party. The enlarged party travels throughout the country, running across numerous wildlife. The group documents how to hunt for their food, how to set up camp, and meet a group of Maasai tribesmen, after which the party kills a large male water buffalo.

The group finishes its 3-month safari by tracking and killing a leopard, with its pelt going to Ruark's wife, after which the Ruarks return to the United States.

== Cast ==
- Robert Ruark - Narrator
- Harry Selby - Professional hunter
- Andrew Holmberg - Professional hunter
- John Sutton - Professional hunter

== Production ==
In July 1954 it was reported that the documentary would be released in October, but by early September that date had been moved up to sometime in September, and by mid-September it was revealed that the film would open on September 28 at the Normandie Theater in New York City.

== Reception ==
Modern Screen said the documentary was an accurate depiction of travel in Africa, calling it an "absorbing record of an African safari", and praising the photography. Motion Picture Daily gave the film a positive review, calling it a "down-to-earth documentary on the Dark Continent as it really is, with no attempt to unduly dramatize or glamorize." The Nevada State Journal (now the Reno Gazette-Journal), also gave the film a positive review, saying it gave "you a true picture of sections of Africa, as we find it today." The newspaper praised the cinematography, comparing it favorably to films such as Mogambo.

In India, the film was one of several which led to civil unrest in New Delhi in 1955. In response to the protests, Jawaharlal Nehru, then Prime Minister of India, instigated an investigation into foreign films who categorized themselves as documentaries.
