= Stanley Hotel, Nairobi =

Hotel in Kenya

Sarova Stanley
- Hotel logo

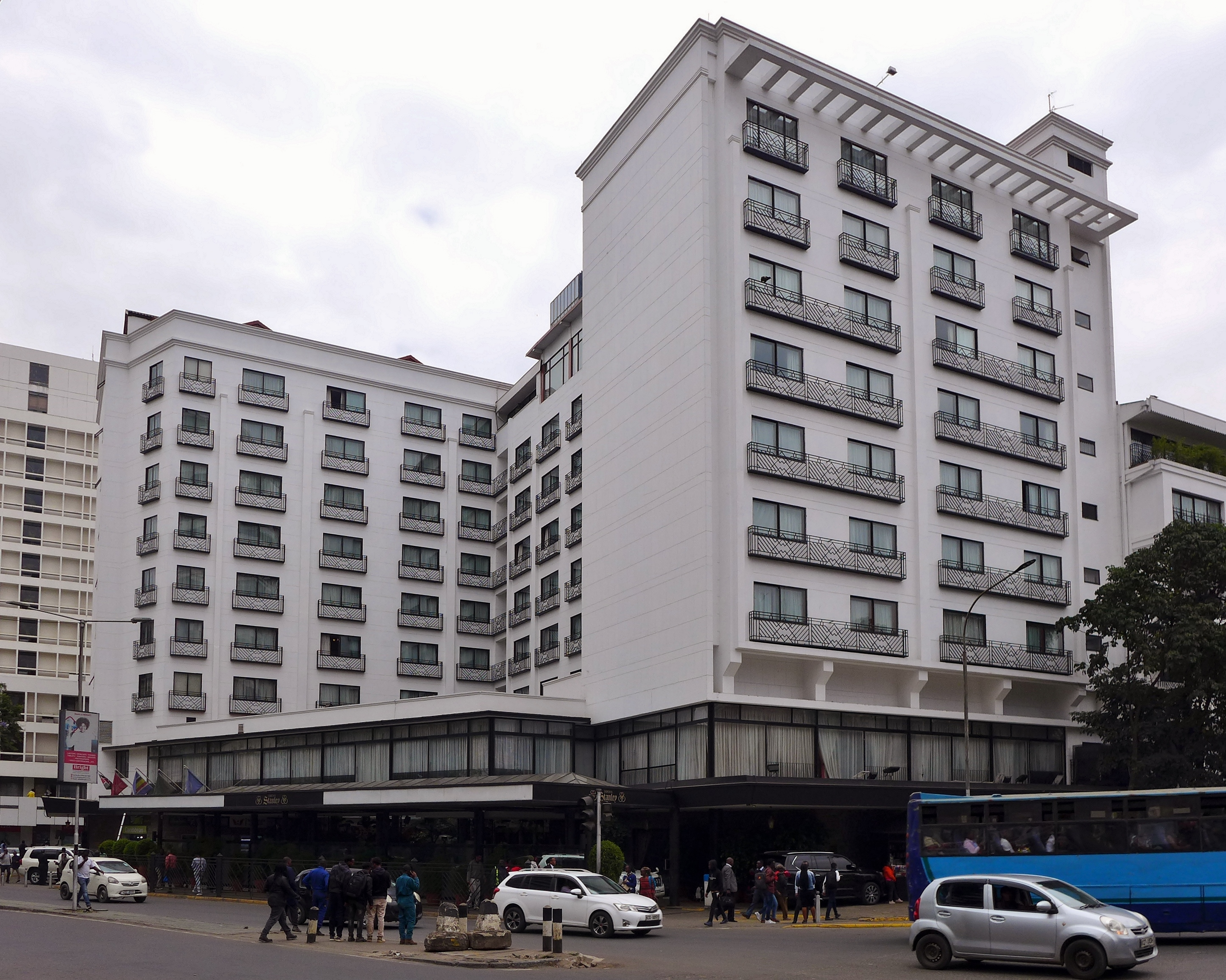
- The hotel in 2025
- Interactive map of the Sarova Stanley area
- Former names: New Stanley Hotel
- Etymology: Named for Henry Morton Stanley

General information
- Location: Kimathi St, Nairobi, Kenya
- Opened: 1902
- Owner: Sarova Group

Other information
- Number of rooms: 217
- Number of restaurants: 3 + 1 bar
- Facilities: Pool, Gym, Conference Room, Business Center, Ballroom

Website
- https://www.sarovahotels.com/stanley-nairobi/

The Stanley Hotel (currently called the Sarova Stanley) is a five-star hotel in Nairobi, Kenya. It is the first luxury hotel in Nairobi, having been established in 1902 by English businesswoman Mayence Bent, when the city was a railway halt. It is named after Sir Henry Morton Stanley, a Welsh explorer who is best known for his explorations of central Africa and his successful search for missionary and explorer David Livingstone.

Since the early 1900s, the Stanley Hotel has been known as the traditional meeting place for those going on safari in Kenya. It has played host to royalty, politicians, movie stars, and authors. It is still used for national business conferences and tourism activities.

The Sarova Stanley has a total of 217 rooms as of 2015. Several of the suites and other rooms are named for dignitaries and other notable persons who have stayed in the hotel such as The Windsor penthouse suite, named for Prince Edward, Duke of Windsor; The Karen Blixen suite, named for Karen Blixen, author of Out of Africa; The Hemingway conference suite, named for author Ernest Hemingway, and The Churchill Ballroom, named for Winston Churchill, Prime Minister of the United Kingdom. The Stanley Presidential Suite, named for famed explorer Henry Morton Stanley, has been used by Namibian President Sam Nujoma.

The hotel has three restaurants: the Thorn Tree Café, named for the original acacia tree used for years as a message depot; the Thai Chi Restaurant; and the Pool Deck Restaurant. The Exchange Bar, named for the Nairobi Securities Exchange, is the successor to the Long Bar, where local stocks were first traded in Nairobi.

== History ==
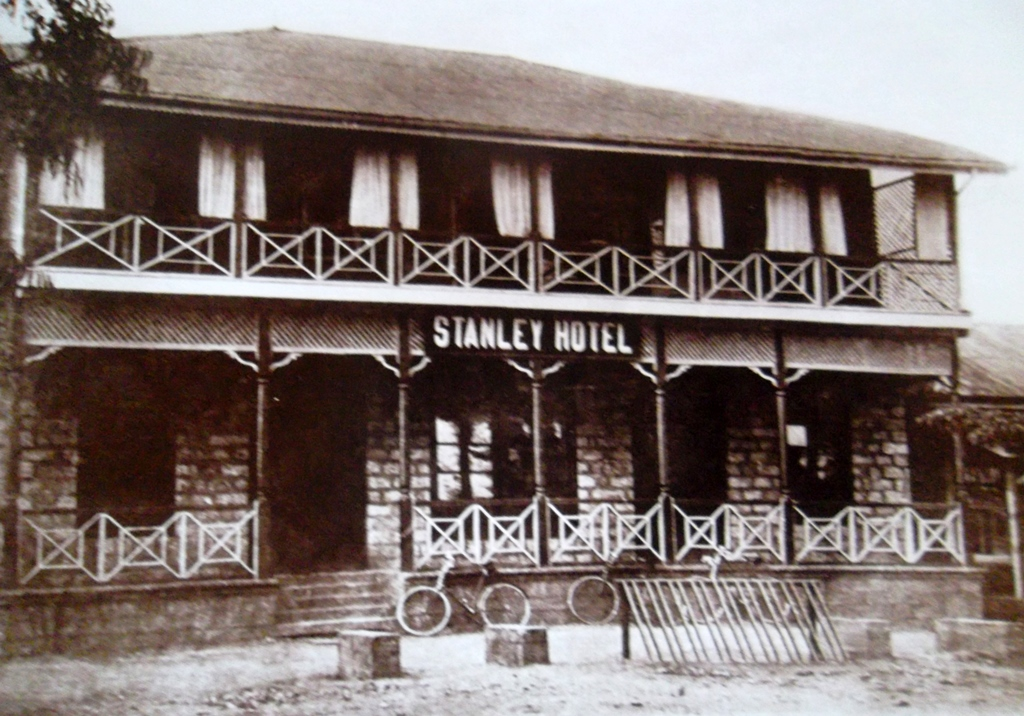
Stanley Hotel (c. 1904)

The Stanley Hotel was originally opened in 1902 as the Victoria Hotel, four sparsely appointed rooms above Tommy Wood's general store, where Mayence Bent (née Woodbury) ran the store and its post office, and also worked as a dressmaker and milliner. Mayence had taken the job at the store in 1898 after moving to Nairobi with her husband (and step-brother) William Stanley Bent, and their daughter Gladys. Mayence would bring fresh butter and vegetables from her husband's 40-acre (16 ha) farm in Kikuyu for the hotel's guests. In 1904, after a disagreement with Wood, Mayence entered into a business arrangement with a farmer from Sotik, Daniel Ernest Cooper, and opened the first Stanley Hotel.

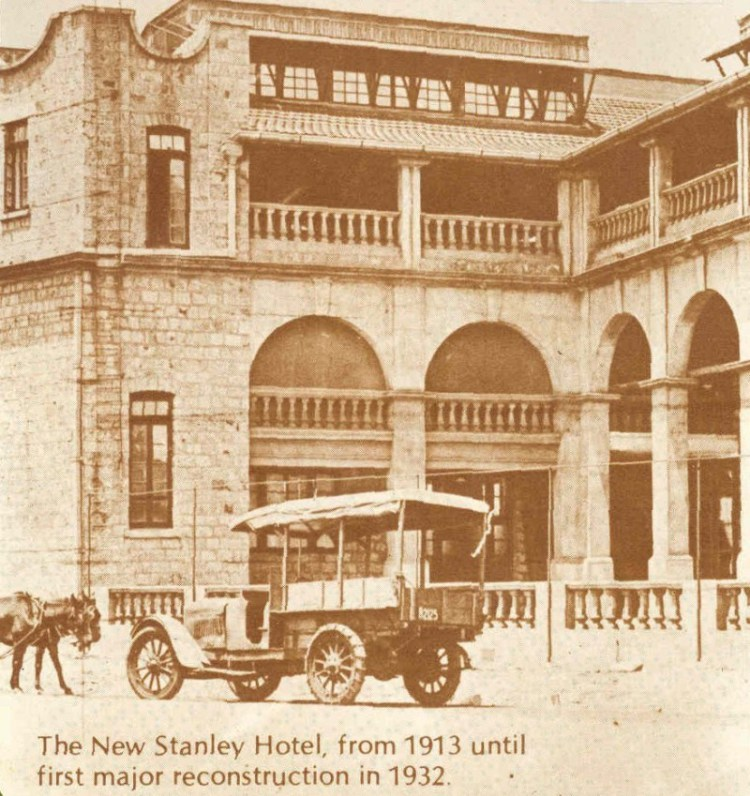
New Stanley Hotel (1913)

That first Stanley Hotel was a two-story wooden building with 15 beds. In 1905, a liquor license was granted to D. E. Cooper for the hotel. Later that year, a fire destroyed much of Victoria Street (now Tom Mboya Street), where both hotels were located. Mayence quickly moved her tenants to an unused rail-road building on Government Road.

W. S. Bent declared insolvency in 1908 (and again in 1913). Soon after, Mayence married Frederick Francis Tate, brother of James William Tate and Dame Maggie Teyte. D. E. Cooper moved back to Sotik in 1909, dissolving his partnership with Mayence. In 1912, Fred Tate purchased two plots of land and had a new hotel designed by architects Robertson, Gow & Davidson, and built on Delamere Avenue. This building had 60 rooms in three stories. In 1913, with the new hotel's completion, the original site was sold to ex-postmaster Daniel William Noble. The Tates had originally planned to transfer the "Stanley Hotel" name to the new location, but Noble sued and won the use of "Old Stanley Hotel". Thus the "New Stanley Hotel" was born.

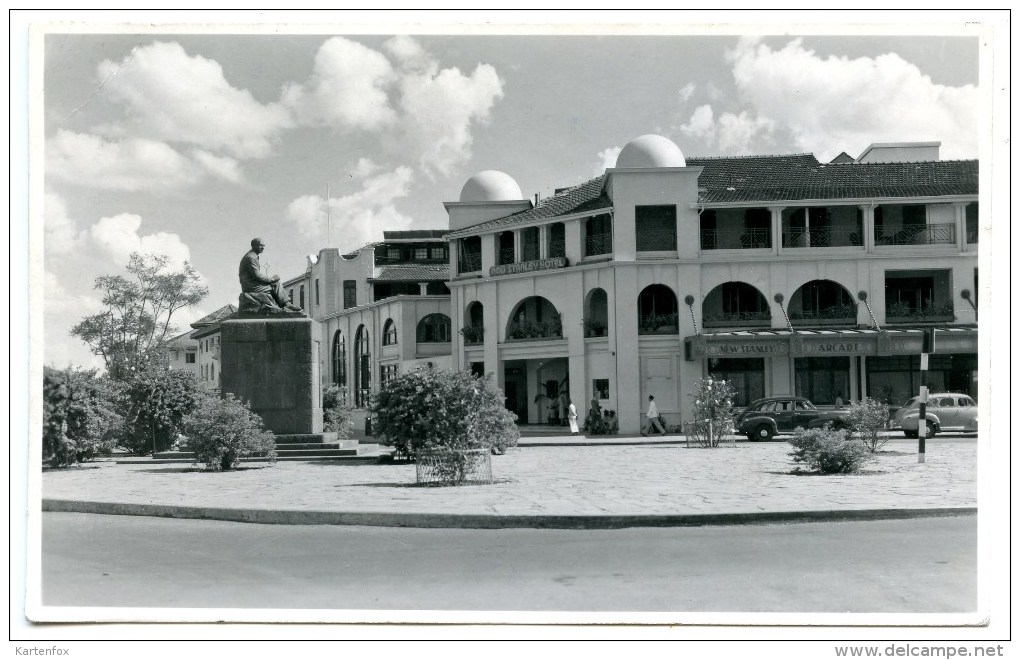
New Stanley Hotel (c. 1950)

During the first World War, Fred Tate served as a lieutenant with the local forces. Soon after he returned, he was struck with blindness and general paralysis. In 1926, he and Mayence moved to London, leaving the hotel to be run by Albert Ernest Waterman, his wife Florence Annie, and their daughter Ruby. In 1932, after six years in London, the Tates returned to Nairobi for the opening of the New Stanley Long Bar. Fred Tate kept busy with the constant appraisal of the hotel's guests, and the minutiae of things such as the daily menu. After Fred's death in 1937, Mayence's interest in managing the hotel's affairs waned. She eventually sold the hotel to Abraham Lazarus Block, a Jewish Lithuanian entrepreneur, in 1947, although she still maintained a financial interest. Mayence later moved to Hove, Sussex, where she died in 1968 at the age of 99.

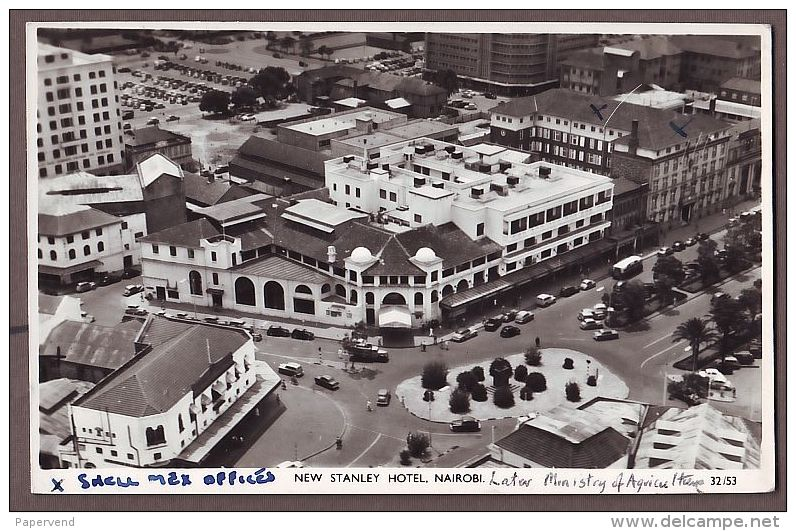
New Stanley Hotel (c. 1950)

Abraham Block's involvement with the Stanley Hotel had started not in 1947, but in 1903. One of Block's earliest business transactions in Nairobi was a deal with Mayence Bent involving having new mattresses sewn for the Victoria Hotel. Block had originally fled from his homeland of Lithuania to England to escape religious persecution. Seeing that living in London "was taking him nowhere", he soon followed his father, who had fled to South Africa, and later fought in the Second Boer War. Block, convinced that Kenya was a "New Zion" for Jews, travelled to Nairobi via the Post steamer Feldmarschall and overland by train. Soon after arriving, Block met Mayence, who informed him of her need for mattresses. He hired R. A. de Souza to sew covers, hired labourers who were loitering around Tommy Wood's general store to stuff them with residual grass which had been previously cut for railroad clearing, and, when stronger needles were needed to sew the heavy cloth, constructed them from bicycle spokes.

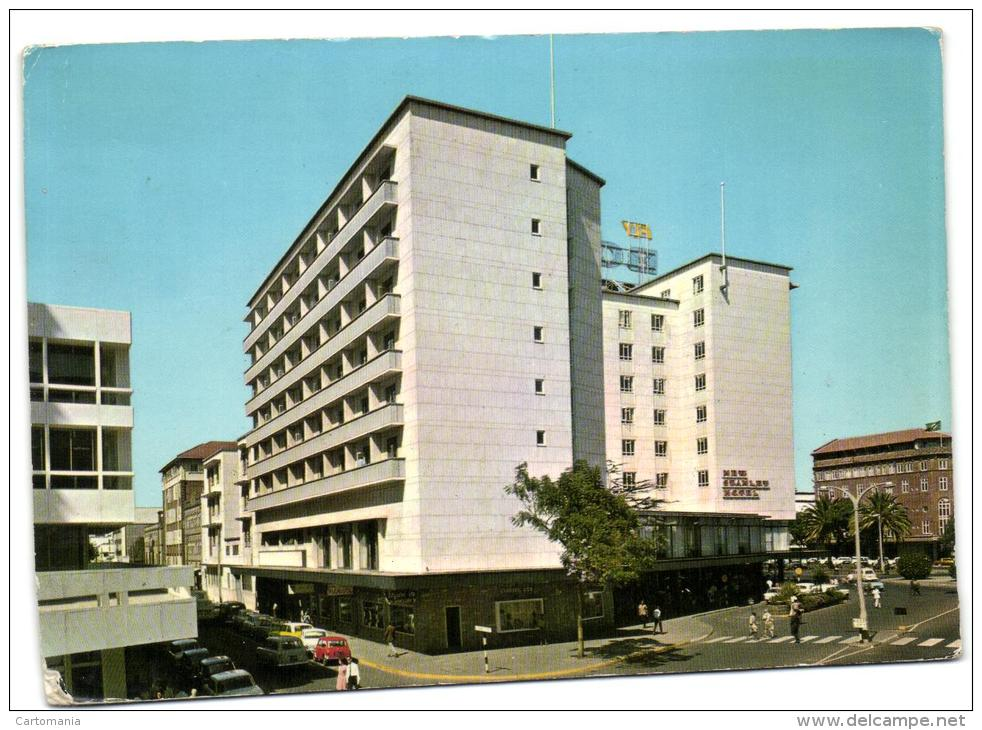
New Stanley Hotel (c. 1960)

In 1958, most of the hotel structure was torn down and rebuilt per Abraham Block's two sons' plans for expansion.

In 1978, the hotel was purchased by the Sarova Group from Abraham Block and family.

In 1998, a US$20 million renovation took place, and the Sarova Group restored the hotel's original name, "The Stanley Hotel".

The hotel was the first place to sell Kenya's Tusker Beer in 1922. The first ten bottles were hand-produced and personally delivered to the hotel's manager. The same year, a stock exchange was floated in the Exchange Bar; that exchange ultimately developed into the Nairobi Securities Exchange in 1954.

== Amenities ==
The Stanley Hotel has 217 rooms, including 160 deluxe rooms, 32 club rooms, two courier singles, 21 themed suites, a presidential suite, and a penthouse. The deluxe rooms are classically appointed with chintz-style decorations and plush carpeting. Suites have a living room and guest water closet, as well as the bedroom (two bedrooms in some suites). The presidential suite also has a bodyguard room.

There are nine meeting and conference rooms with audio-visual equipment, including a 227-square-metre (2,440 sq ft) ballroom, and a business center with computers, fax, photocopier, and secretarial services.

The Sarova Stanley has a heated rooftop swimming pool, as well as a health club with a sauna and steambath.

There is a shopping arcade located on the first floor with gift shops, a boutique, a chemist, and an optician.

=== Restaurants and bars ===
The Sarova Stanley's food offerings have come a long way since May Bent served vegetables and butter from her husband's farm.

Thai Chi, opened in 2007, serves authentic 13th-century Thai cuisine. Chef Phansandha Phommee, known as "Chef Pu", is the winner of multiple awards, including the "Best Hotel Restaurant and Chef Nairobi" from the Chefs Delight Awards in 2013. The restaurant is known as one of Nairobi's "most elegant dining establishments", and has been called the "most authentic Thai restaurant in East Africa". The restaurant is decorated with fine Thai art and sculptures. The restaurant has a smart casual dress code and does not allow children under 12.

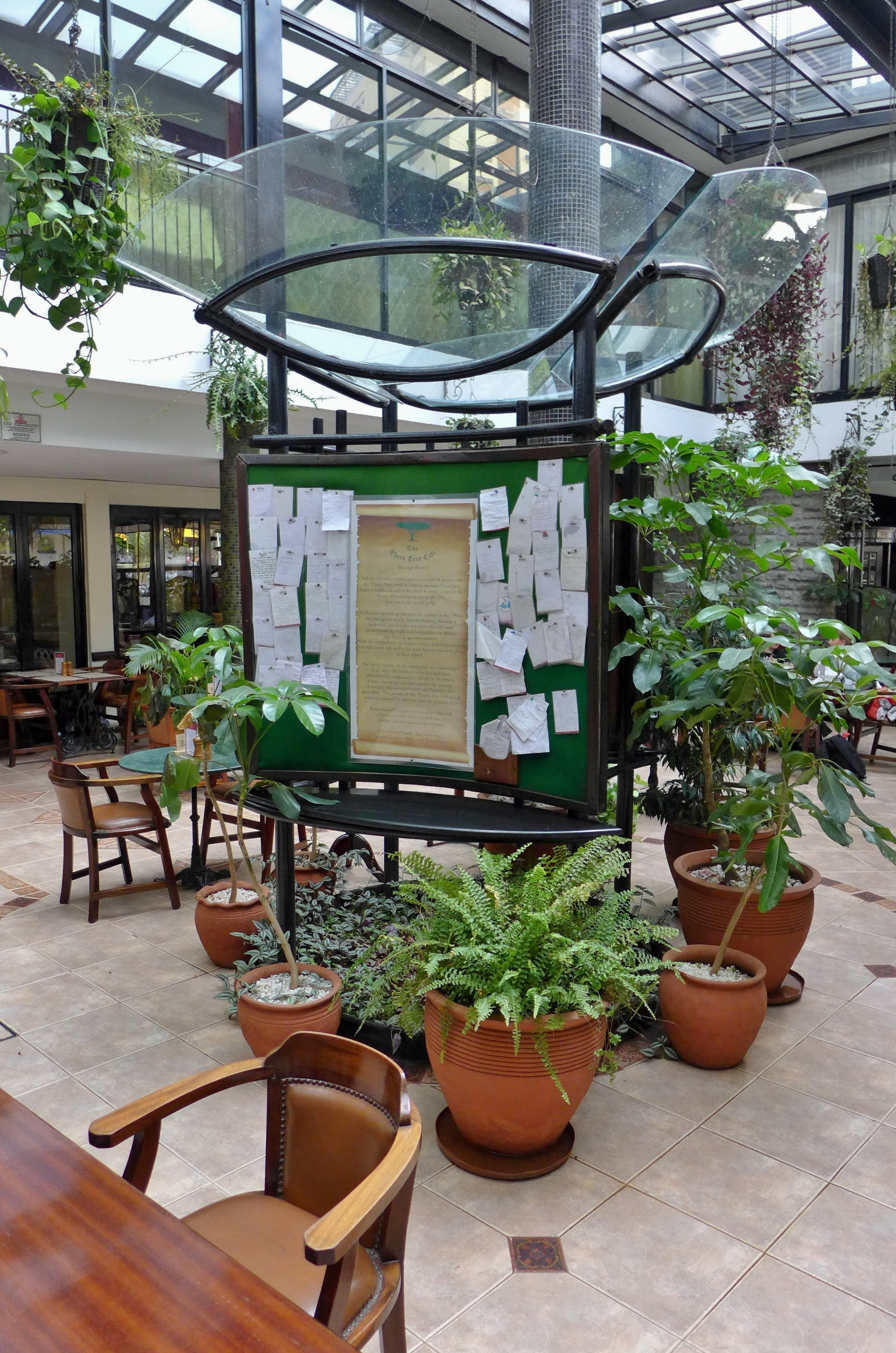
Thorn Tree message board in 2025

The legendary Thorn Tree Café is an open air café in the hotel. The café serves continental and nouvelle dishes, including pizza from a wood-fired oven. The café is headed by Chef Don Githua.

The café is named after a Naivasha thorn tree (Acacia xanthophloea) in its centre. Travellers used to pin notes to others onto the thorns of the tree. The current tree is the third of the same variety. The first was planted in 1961, and when it was ailing a new one was planted in its place. This new tree began to droop, and in 1997 was replaced with the current tree. During the planting ceremony, a time capsule was buried beneath it, to be opened in 2038. The first post office in Nairobi was based here, and tourists still leave messages and advertisements. From 1996 to 2021, the forum of the largest travel guide book publisher, Lonely Planet, was named the "Thorn Tree travel forum" after this tree.

The Pool Deck Restaurant is located adjacent to the hotel's rooftop pool on the fifth floor. It is al fresco style with buffet options.

The Exchange Bar is named for the Nairobi Securities Exchange. It is the successor to the renowned Long Bar, opened in 1932.

== Notable residents and tenants ==
Princess Elizabeth and Prince Philip in front of The New Stanley Hotel, 5 February 1952

The hotel is known for having hosted conferences between world leaders, authors, and film actors, including Ernest Hemingway, Winston Churchill, Clark Gable, Ava Gardner, Grace Kelly, Gregory Peck, Michael Caine, Sean Connery, and Frank Sinatra. In 1952, the then Princess Elizabeth visited the hotel as part of a world tour, shortly before the death of her father, King George VI, and her subsequent succession as Queen of the United Kingdom and Head of the Commonwealth.

The Stanley has influenced several authors. Ernest Hemingway stayed at the hotel on several occasions. In 1934, Hemingway stayed for several weeks while recovering from amoebic dysentery. During this time, he made notes for his books Green Hills of Africa and The Snows of Kilimanjaro. Hemingway mentions the Stanley in these works, and is also credited with introducing the word "safari" to the English language. Hemingway returned to the hotel in 1954.

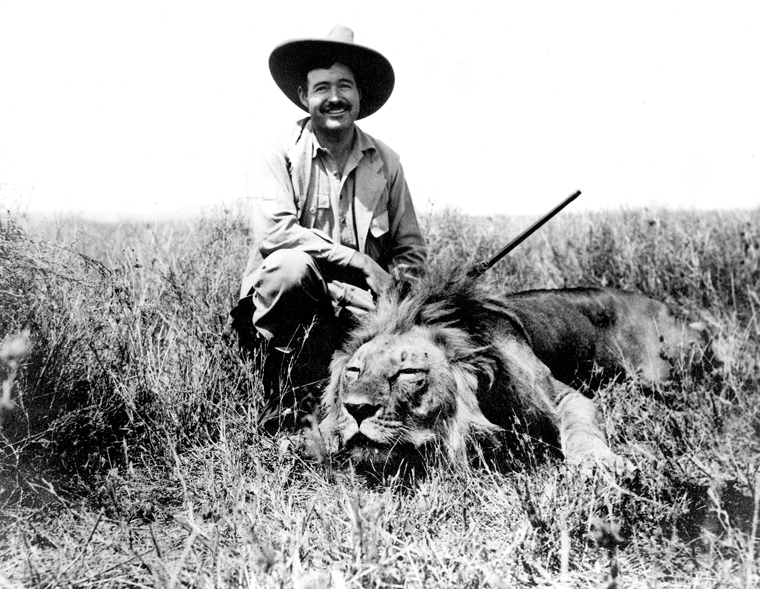
Ernest Hemingway on safari, 1934

Colonel John Henry Patterson, who wrote the true story The Man-eaters of Tsavo that inspired the film The Ghost and the Darkness, also found his inspiration while staying at the Stanley.

Elspeth Huxley, author of The Flame Trees of Thika, The Mottled Lizard, Red Strangers, and other books, frequented the Stanley Hotel and used it as a setting for several of her works.

== In popular culture ==
"The Short Happy Life of Francis Macomber", a 1936 short story by Ernest Hemingway, takes place at the New Stanley Hotel. In 1947, it was adapted into The Macomber Affair, a film starring Gregory Peck and Joan Bennett, which was shot at the hotel.

Part of Episode 2 of the Yellowstone origin story 1923 is set at the Stanley.
