= Philip Percival =

British hunter and safari guide (1886–1966)

- Born: Philip Hope Percival; 1886; Newcastle upon Tyne, Northern England, United Kingdom
- Died: 1966 (aged 79–80)
- Occupations: White hunter, safari guide

Philip Hope Percival (1886–1966) was a renowned English-born white hunter and early safari guide in colonial Kenya. During his career, he guided Theodore Roosevelt, Baron Rothschild, and Ernest Hemingway on African hunts. Hemingway modelled the fictional hunter Robert Wilson in his story "The Short Happy Life of Francis Macomber" after Percival. Percival also worked with well-known white hunters like Bror von Blixen-Finecke and mentored Sydney Downey and Harry Selby, and was known in African hunting circles as the "Dean of Hunters".

== Early life ==
Percival was born in Newcastle upon Tyne in Northern England, at the tail end of the 19th century. When Philip was still quite young, his older brother Blaney (born 1875) went off to East Africa, and proceeded to send Philip several exciting accounts of his life as a game warden there. When Philip turned 21, he inherited a small sum of money and struck out to join his brother in Africa, sailing to Mombasa. Percival settled in Limuru, where he grew coffee and wheat and bred ostriches, cattle and horses.

== Hunting life ==
Upon reaching Africa, Percival was quick to pick up hunting with his brother and Harold and Clifford Hill, who were also ostrich farmers. The ostriches they raised were used as bait to lure lion and other big game. At first, Percival mainly hunted lions with the Hills, but in time he started to lead hunting trips of his own. Initially he charged clients a fee of ten pounds per week and an additional twenty-five pounds per lion and in those days guides like Percival only provided the wagon, pack animals and a couple of assistants, leaving the clients to provide their own food, drink, tents and bedding.

=== Theodore Roosevelt safari ===
In 1909, Philip's brother Blaney had been instrumental in bringing then-Colonel Theodore Roosevelt to East Africa for a safari, and Philip was given the opportunity to work as an assistant hunter on the trip. Roosevelt remembered Percival well, writing about him:

"At Bondoni was Percival, a tall, sinewy man, a fine rider and shot—like so many other men whom I met, he wore merely a helmet, a flannel shirt, short breeches or trunks, and puttees and boots. I shall not forget seeing him one day as he walked beside his twelve-ox team, cracking his long whip, while in the big wagon sat pretty Mrs. Percival with a puppy, and little cheetah cub, which we had found and presented to her and which she was taming."

After the Roosevelt safari, Percival decided to become a full-time white hunter, and one of his first solo clients was Baron Rothschild. He also conducted safaris for other royals, like the Duke and Duchess of Connaught.

=== Company man ===
As he became more ingrained into the hunting life, Percival joined the safari company Newland and Tarlton, along with other hunters like Alan Black. When Newland and Tarlton dissolved in 1919, and Safariland was created out of its ashes, he stayed on with that outfit as well. During this time, he mentored a new generation of hunters like Sydney Downey and Harry Selby. Percival also went on to become the first president of the East African Professional Hunter's Association, a position he served in for 15 years. In 1930, before his tenure as EAPHA president, Percival left Safariland to team up with Bror von Blixen-Finecke in the joint venture Tanganyika Guides Ltd., of which he was the Kenya director, with Bror heading up the Tanganyika operation.

=== Ernest Hemingway ===
During his partnership with von Blixen, Percival guided Ernest Hemingway on both of Hemingway's African safaris, the first coming in 1934. Hemingway struck up a friendship with Percival, affectionately calling him "Pop", a name they used for each other, and also one of the monikers Hemingway gave to Jackson Philips in Green Hills of Africa, a character modelled on Percival. Hemingway also considered Percival a great teacher, and most notably molded the Percival he knew into the character of Robert Wilson, in "The Short Happy Life of Francis Macomber". Yet Percival was not the only model for Wilson, and indeed critics have identified Bror von Blixen as another influence, especially in terms of Wilson's "cynicism and womanizing".

== Legacy ==
The legacy of Philip Percival, the "Dean of Hunters", runs deeper than his influence on Hemingway. Percival also mentored a new generation of African hunters, including Sydney Downey, who called him "the greatest white hunter of all time", and Harry Selby, who himself went on to captivate a new generation of foreigners through the travel writings of Robert Ruark.

His autobiography Hunting, Settling & Remembering was published in 1997, with a foreword by his younger daughter, Joy.

== See also ==
- List of big-game hunters
