= Arthur Blayney Percival =

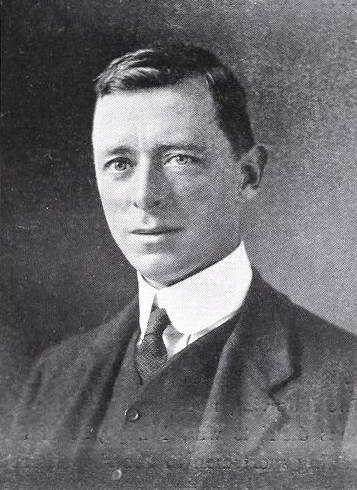
c. 1908

Arthur Blayney Percival (7 March 1875 – 20 January 1941) was a British naturalist, and hunter, who served as a game ranger in Colonial East Africa. He was involved in managing reserves mainly for white colonial trophy hunters and preventing traditional tribal communities from using reserve land.

== Life and work ==
Percival was born in Newcastle-on-Tyne and studied at the Bluecoat School and the Durham College of Science. He specialized in zoology. He travelled to Arabia to collect birds on a British Museum expedition. He then moved to East Africa and became an assistant collector in 1900. He became a Ranger of Game Reserves in 1901 under Sir Charles Eliot. He was involved in creating the game laws of 1906. He became a senior game ranger in 1907. In 1909 he was one of the founders of the East Africa and Uganda Natural History Society. He collected mammal specimens for the Coryndon Memorial Museum in Nairobi. In 1915 he was made Game Warden. F. J. Jackson mentioned that Percival "as a Ranger is not brilliant" and Ainsworth wrote that he was "useless as a game ranger". He retired in 1923 and lived in "Mamandu", Machakos from 1930 where he died of laryngeal cancer. His younger brother Philip Hope Percival became the president of the East African Professional Hunters Association founded in 1934.

Percival was married to Dolly Edwards who died in 1919. In 1920 he married Nellie Winifred Jacqueline 'Jacky', widow of Thomas William Breckenridge. A daughter Margaret (1922-2016, later Kummerfeldt) settled in the US while a son, Peter "Buster", died in World War II. A number of species have been named after him including Oriolus percivali, Rhynchostruthus percivali, Clootis percivali, Acomys percivali, and Gerbillus percivali..

Percival wrote A Game Ranger’s Note Book (1924) and A Game Ranger on Safari (1928).
