= Bror von Blixen-Finecke =

Swedish baron (1886–1946)

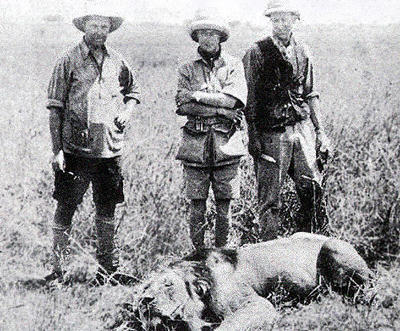
- Blixen (left) with Edward, Prince of Wales and Denys Finch Hatton (right), 1928.
- Born: Bror Fredrik von Blixen-Finecke; 25 July 1886; Näsbyholm Castle, Sweden
- Died: 4 March 1946 (aged 59); Börringe, Sweden
- Occupations: Writer, hunter
- Spouses: Karen Dinesen (m. 1914; div. 1925) Jacqueline Harriet Alexander (m. 1928; div. 1935) Eva Dickson (m. 1936; died 1938)
- Parent(s): Hovjägmästare, Baron Fredrik von Blixen-Finecke; Countess Clara Krag-Juel-Vind-Frijs
- Relatives: Hans von Blixen-Finecke (brother)

Baron Bror Fredrik von Blixen-Finecke (25 July 1886 – 4 March 1946) was a Swedish nobleman, writer, professional hunter and guide on African big-game hunts. He was married to Karen Blixen (née Dinesen) from 1914 to 1925.

== Personal life ==
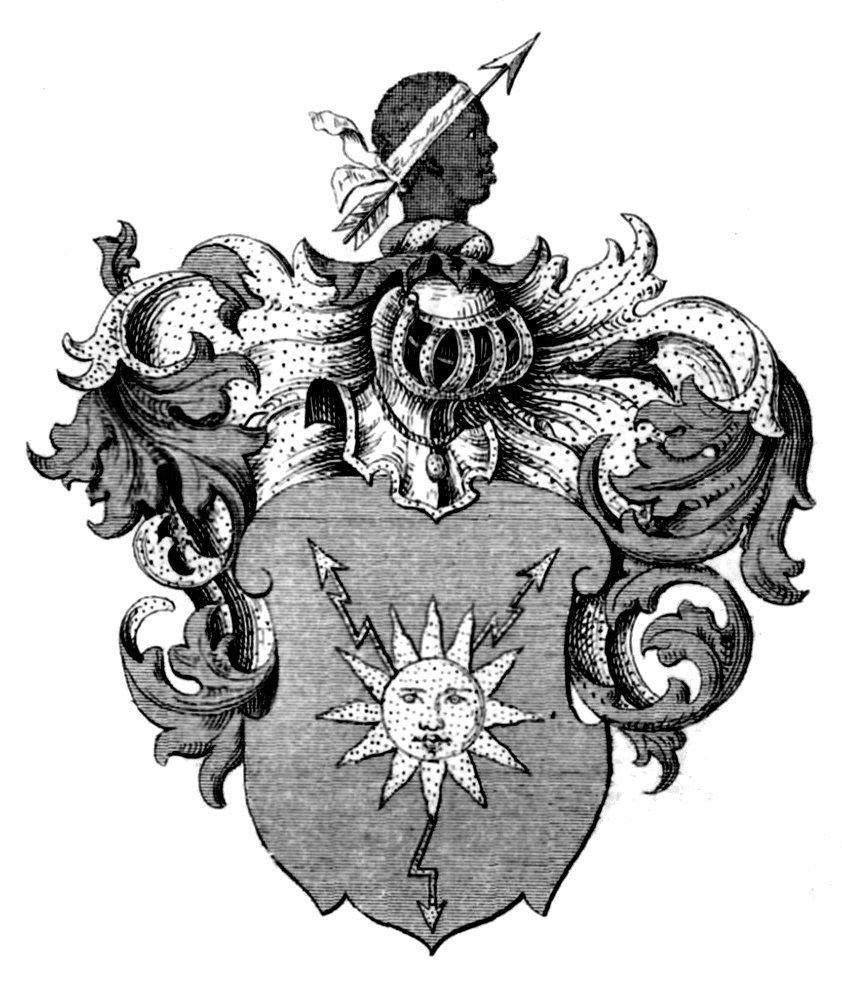
Blixen's coat of arms

Bror Fredrik "Blix" von Blixen-Finecke and his twin brother, Hans Gustaf, were the youngest of seven children born to Baron Fredrik von Blixen-Finecke (1847–1919) and his wife, Countess Clara Krag-Juel-Vind-Frijs (1855–1925). His paternal grandfather was Baron Carl Frederik Axel Bror von Blixen-Finecke (1822–1873), who held the family seat at Näsbyholm Castle and served Denmark as its Minister of Foreign Affairs 1859–1860, while his grandmother was the Baron's first wife, Gustava Charlotta Ankarcrona (1821–1890), a descendant of John III of Sweden. Bror's maternal grandfather was Count Christian Emil Krag-Juel-Vind-Frijs, Denmark's prime minister 1865–1870 and a descendant of Frederick III of Denmark.

Blixen-Finecke attended agricultural college at Alnarp, and then managed the Stjärneholm farm, within the Näsbyholm estate. Blix and Hans had known "Tanne", Karen Dinesen, since childhood, since Blix's mother and Tanne's father were cousins. Hans had actually turned down Tanne, before she became attached to Blix. A visit from Blix's maternal uncle, Count Mogens Frijs, and his tales of life in Naivasha, inspired Blix to seek his future in Africa.

In 1912, Bror Fredrik von Blixen-Finecke became engaged to Karen Dinesen, who followed him to Kenya in 1913, where they were married on 14 January 1914 in Mombasa. They then ran a 4,500-acre (1,800-hectare) coffee plantation at the foot of Ngong Hills, bought by Blixen from Åke Sjögren, using funds provided on behalf of her family. They lived in the manager's house, located on the Mbagathi River, until 1917, when they moved into the main two-story stone farm house. During WWI, Blix served in Lord Delamere's patrols along the border with German-Tanganyika, and Tanne helped transport supplies. According to Peter Capstick, "It was not long after Blixen and his wife settled on their farm that he started womanizing." Karen became infected with syphilis as a consequence. Capstick goes on to say, "His forays into town and his often wild socializing at the Muthaiga Club, coupled with a legendary indiscipline when it came to money and honoring his debts, soon gave the charming Swede a notorious reputation." The farm did not prosper, the couple separated, and eventually divorced. Yet, thirty years after their first safari, Karen was quoted as saying, "If I should wish anything back of my life, it would be to go on safari once again with Bror Blixen."

Aage Westenholz, Tanne's maternal uncle and family trustee after her father died, turned the farm into a company in 1918 with Aage as the chairman. Blaming the farm's losses on Blix, Aage banned Blix from the farm in the spring of 1920, and by 1921 Tanne and Blixen were separated.In Blixen's words, "Difficulty upon difficulty arose. The plantation had to be sold-my home was broken up. I stood there in the forest empty-handed. But I still had my sporting rifle." Blixen then took up professional hunting from 1922 to 1928, with time out in 1927 to accompany Charles Markham in crossing Africa east to west, first in The Vagrant from Stanleyville to Kano, then 2,818 miles (4,535 km) via International Harvester truck to Paris across Sahara Desert.

On 1 August 1928, he married the British aristocrat Jacqueline Harriet "Cockie" Alexander. They managed Singu, a 5,000-acre (2,000-hectare) property at Babati, owned by Blixen's first hunting client Dick Cooper. In 1929, Blixen concentrated on his safari business and became Cooper's East Africa agent. The safari work enabled the Blixens to purchase their own farm at Ndasagu. When he was visited in Kenya by the Swedish adventurer and aviator Eva Dickson in 1932, while "Cockie" was visiting her mother in England, the marriage quickly ended, as he and Eva became lovers. In 1935, he and "Cockie" divorced, and the following year he married Eva in New York, and they spent their honeymoon together with Ernest Hemingway and his wife Pauline Pfeiffer sailing around Cuba and the Bahamas. Cockie was quoted by Ulf Aschan as saying, "I have never regretted anything — except leaving Blix. He was the love of my life."

In March 1938, Eva Dickson von Blixen-Finecke died in a car crash outside Baghdad, on her way back from Calcutta after having been forced to give up her big dream of driving the Silk Road to Beijing. Bror von Blixen-Finecke didn't learn about her death until 28 July 1938, and he was devastated by the news.

Blix left Africa for good in 1938, eventually returning to his native Sweden. He died in a 1946 car accident, in which he was a passenger. Von Blixen-Finecke's identical twin, Hans, had died in a plane crash in 1917.

== Big-game hunter in Africa ==
Blixen formed Tanganyika Guides Ltd, for professional hunting, in partnership with Philip Percival and Jeff Manley. Blixen and Percival became East Africa's leading hunters. According to Ulf Aschan, "Safaris lasted from one month to three. A meticulous organizer, Blix never left anything to chance. Fly camps, fuel depots, airstrips, provisions, and staff were always laid out well in advance. He would also take time to reconnoiter an area thoroughly beforehand to check on waterholes and general game movements."

On 16 Nov. 1928, according to Bror, he was approached by the Prince of Wales in his quest to "bag a lion". Bror and his "old friend" Denys Finch Hatton proceeded to help the prince do so followed by a hunt for buffalo. They had a repetition expedition with the prince, but for elephant, in February 1930.

Other notable personages Blixen guided on a hunt included Ernst Udet, Alfred Gwynne Vanderbilt Jr., George Washington Vanderbilt III, Ernest Hemingway, Freddie Guest, Winston Frederick Churchill Guest, and Lord Marmaduke Furness.

According to Beryl Markham in her memoir West with the Night, "He is six feet [180 cm] of amiable Swede and, to my knowledge, the toughest, most durable White Hunter ever to snicker at the fanfare of safari or to shoot a charging buffalo between the eyes while debating whether his sundown drink would be gin or whiskey."

"Hunting with Blix was a magnificent experience," said Ebba Hamilton, "With his quiet, almost lyrical narrative of what happened around us, he got nature to live like I have never experienced since.

Rose Cartwright stated that Blixen was, "An excellent shot, a meticulous organizer, and very good teacher. He was on a par with the best African trackers, and they admired him greatly for his skills and stamina."

Blixen has been identified by literary critics as an influence for the Robert Wilson character in Hemingway's short story "The Short Happy Life of Francis Macomber", especially in terms of the character's "cynicism and womanizing".

== Writing ==
Bror von Blixen-Finecke was a talented writer; his best-known book was his autobiography African Hunter (1938), long regarded as fine Africana since its translation from Swedish in 1938 by F. H. Lyon. In 1988, St. Martin's Press published a collection of von Blixen-Finecke's letters to family and friends in a book titled Bror Blixen: The Africa Letters.

== In popular culture ==
In the film Out of Africa (1985), which is based on Karen Blixen's memoirs of the same name, the role of Bror von Blixen-Finecke is played by Austrian actor Klaus Maria Brandauer, who also plays his brother Hans. Blix is a central character in the best selling war/thriller/spy novel The Bullet Garden by Stephen Hunter.

== See also ==
- List of famous big game hunters
- Fairmont The Norfolk Hotel
