= Robert Ruark =

American novelist

Robert Chester Ruark Jr.
- Born: December 29, 1915; Wilmington, North Carolina, U.S.
- Died: July 1, 1965 (aged 49); London, England
- Occupation: Novelist
- Spouse: Virginia Webb
- Writing career
- Notable works: Horn of the Hunter; Something of Value

Robert Ruark (December 29, 1915 in Wilmington, North Carolina – July 1, 1965 in London, England) was an American author, syndicated columnist, and big game hunter.

== Early life ==
Born Robert Chester Ruark Jr., to Charlotte A. Ruark and Robert C. Ruark, a bookkeeper for a wholesale grocery, young Ruark grew up in Wilmington, North Carolina. His brother, David, was adopted, and little is known about him. The Ruark family was deeply affected by the Depression, but still managed to send Robert to college. He graduated early from New Hanover High School and enrolled in the University of North Carolina at Chapel Hill at age 15. His studies included a few journalism classes, but he did not gain a degree.

== Early career ==
In the 1930s, Ruark was fired from an accounting job in the Works Projects Administration, and did a hitch in the United States Merchant Marine. He worked for two small town newspapers in North Carolina: the Hamlet News Messenger and, later, the Sanford Herald.

In 1936, Ruark moved to Washington, D.C., and was hired as a copy boy for The Washington Daily News, a Scripps-Howard newspaper. In just a few months, he was the paper's top sports reporter.

During World War II, Ruark was commissioned an ensign in the United States Navy, and served ten months as a gunnery officer on Atlantic and Mediterranean convoys.

== Marriage ==
In 1938, Ruark married Virginia Webb, an interior designer from an upper-middle-class family in the Washington, D.C., area, and a graduate of Georgetown University. They divorced in 1963 and had no children. Virginia Webb-Ruark died in 1966.

== Writing career ==
Upon his return to Washington, Ruark joined the Scripps-Howard Newspaper Alliance. As his obituary in The New York Times stated, Ruark was "sometimes glad, sometimes sad, and often mad — but almost always provocative." Some of his columns were eventually collected into two books, I Didn't Know It Was Loaded (1948) and One for the Road (1949).

As he became recognized, Ruark began to write fiction, first for literary magazines, and then his first novel, Grenadine Etching, in 1947. The novel parodied the popular historical romances of the time and set the stage for his many humorous novels and articles published in the Saturday Evening Post, Esquire, and other popular publications.

== African safari ==
After enjoying some success as a writer, Ruark decided it was time to fulfill a lifelong dream of going on a safari in Africa, fueled by his doctor's advice to take a year's rest. Legendary Ker and Downey Safaris booked him with Harry Selby. Ruark began a love affair with Africa. Ruark was booked with Selby because of a desire to use a tracker named Kidogo, who had once hunted with Ruark's friend, Russell B. Aitken, when white hunter Frank Bowman guided him. Ruark's pairing with Selby, though fortuitous, was pure chance. At the time of Ruark's safari booking, Kidogo had left Bowman and joined Selby's crew. Ruark requested to hunt with whichever white hunter Kidogo was working for.

As a result of this first safari, Ruark wrote a book called Horn of the Hunter, in which he detailed his hunt. Selby became an overnight legend and was subsequently booked by Americans for up to five years in advance to duplicate Ruark's adventures. After the first safari, Selby and Ruark went hunting again, and this time they took cameras along. The result was a one-hour documentary titled Africa Adventure, released by RKO Pictures. Though extremely difficult to find, a 16mm print of this movie was discovered in 2002, and a DVD copy was created and donated to the Robert Ruark Foundation in Southport, North Carolina. An online version was subsequently posted on a popular consumer streaming site.

In 1953, Ruark began writing a series for Field & Stream magazine entitled The Old Man and the Boy. Considered largely autobiographical (although technically fiction), this heartwarming series ran until late 1961. The stories were characterized by the philosophical musings of the Old Man, who was modeled after both of Ruark's grandfathers, but mostly on Captain Edward "Ned" Hall Adkins, Ruark's maternal grandfather. In the stories, young Bob Ruark grows up hunting and fishing in coastal North Carolina, always guided by the Old Man. However, the pain of his parents' difficult domestic life and his relatively few childhood friends (Ruark, something of a child prodigy in school, was a loner) are tellingly absent from the narratives. Many of the stories were collected into a book of the same name, followed shortly thereafter by a companion book entitled The Old Man's Boy Grows Older. Today, these two books are probably his best remembered works. Twenty stories were also published in the book Robert Ruark's Africa.

Ruark's first bestselling novel was published in 1955. Entitled Something of Value, it describes the Mau Mau Uprising by Kenyan rebels against British rule. The novel drew from the author's personal knowledge and experiences on safari in Africa, and was adapted into a 1957 film, Something of Value. Uhuru, a novel with a similar theme but not intended as a sequel, was published in 1962. "Uhuru" is the Swahili word for freedom. The book apparently libeled a particular politician in Kenya. While Ruark was in Nairobi after its publication, staying at the New Stanley Hotel, he learned that this politician had filed a lawsuit against him. Before he could be served with papers, however, he was tipped off and fled overnight to South Africa by air. He had intended to write a final book in the series with the working title of "A Long View From a Tall Hill," but this never materialized.

== Last years ==
After his first half dozen books or so, Ruark continued to write, though few of his later novels matched his earlier successes. In 1960, after a bittersweet visit to his hometown of Wilmington, North Carolina, Ruark left the U.S. for good. He lived in London and Barcelona, before settling in Sant Antoni de Calonge in Catalunya, Spain. Shortly before his death, he wrote a final article which later appeared in Playboy and was titled "Nothing Works and Nobody Cares." He died in London, England, on July 1, 1965, of cirrhosis of the liver brought on by alcoholism. His last novel, The Honey Badger, exemplified the condition of the author at this time in his life. The book was published posthumously, as was Use Enough Gun, which is essentially a collection of excerpts from his earlier works. More notable are the two collections published by McIntosh and Casada, which represent the author's finest work.

Robert Ruark is buried in Palamós in the Province of Girona in Catalunya, Spain.

== Bibliography ==
- Grenadine Etching (1947)
- I Didn't Know It Was Loaded (1948)
- One for the Road (1949)
- Grenadine's Spawn (1952)
- Horn of the Hunter (1953)
- Ruark, Robert C. (1953). "What hath God wrought?". In Birmingham, Frederic A. (ed.). The girls from Esquire. London: Arthur Barker. pp. 205–213.
- Something of Value (1955)
- The Old Man and the Boy (1957)
- Poor No More (1959)
- The Old Man's Boy Grows Older (1961)
- Uhuru (1962)
- The Honey Badger (1965)
- Use Enough Gun: On Hunting Big Game (1966)
- Women (1967)
- Robert Ruark's Africa by Michael McIntosh (1991), a collection of Ruark's magazine articles
- The Lost Classics (1996), additional hunting adventures

== Filmography ==
- Africa Adventure (1955–56), narrator, writer, and director
