= Fairmont The Norfolk Hotel =

Hotel in Nairobi, Kenya

Coordinates: 1.278295°S 36.815795°E

General information
- Location: Harry Thuku Rd, Nairobi Kenya
- Opening: 1904
- Operator: Fairmont Hotels and Resorts

Other information
- Number of rooms: 170
- Number of restaurants: 4

Website
- Fairmont Norfolk Hotel

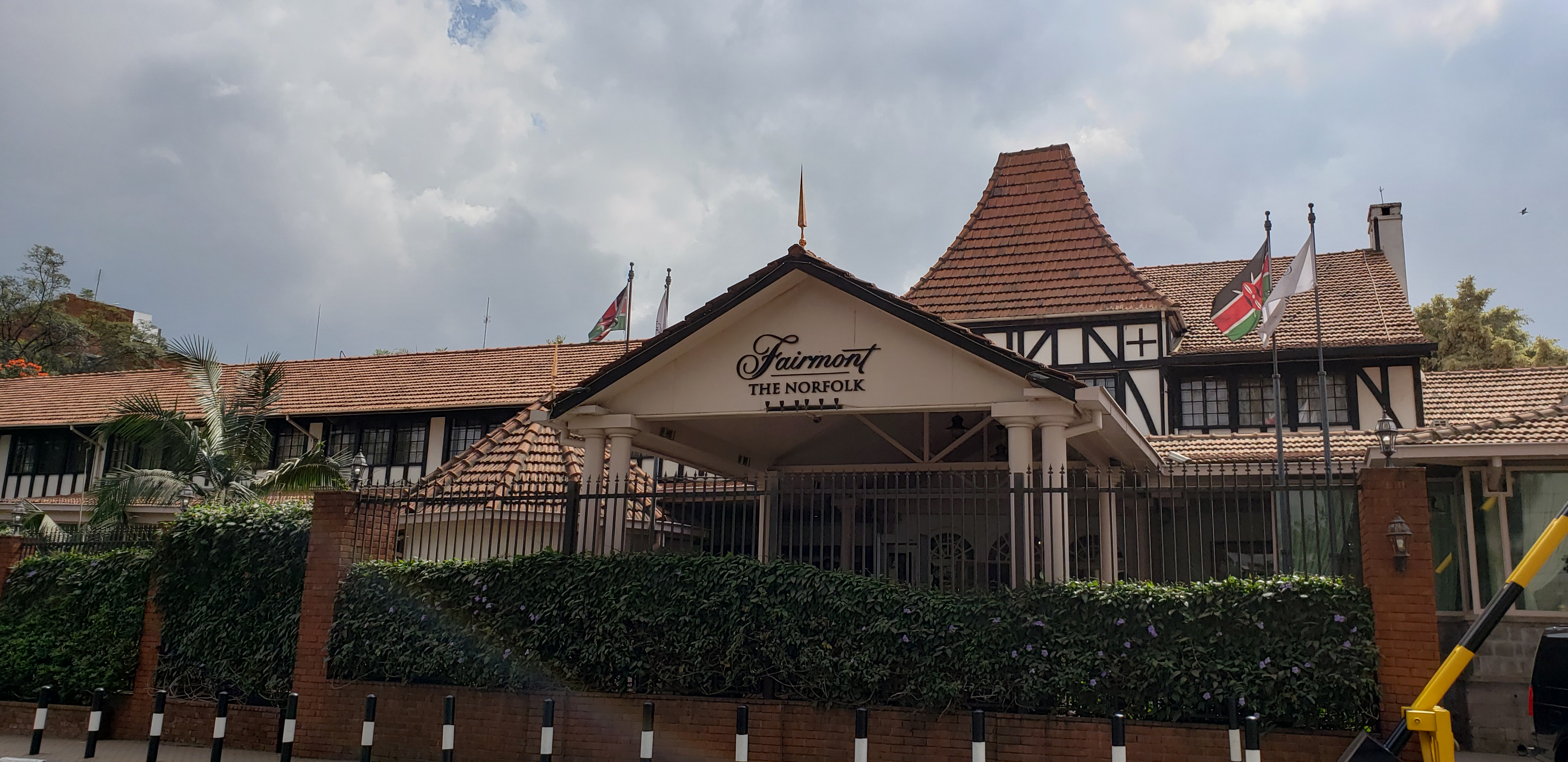
Fairmont The Norfolk Hotel front entrance

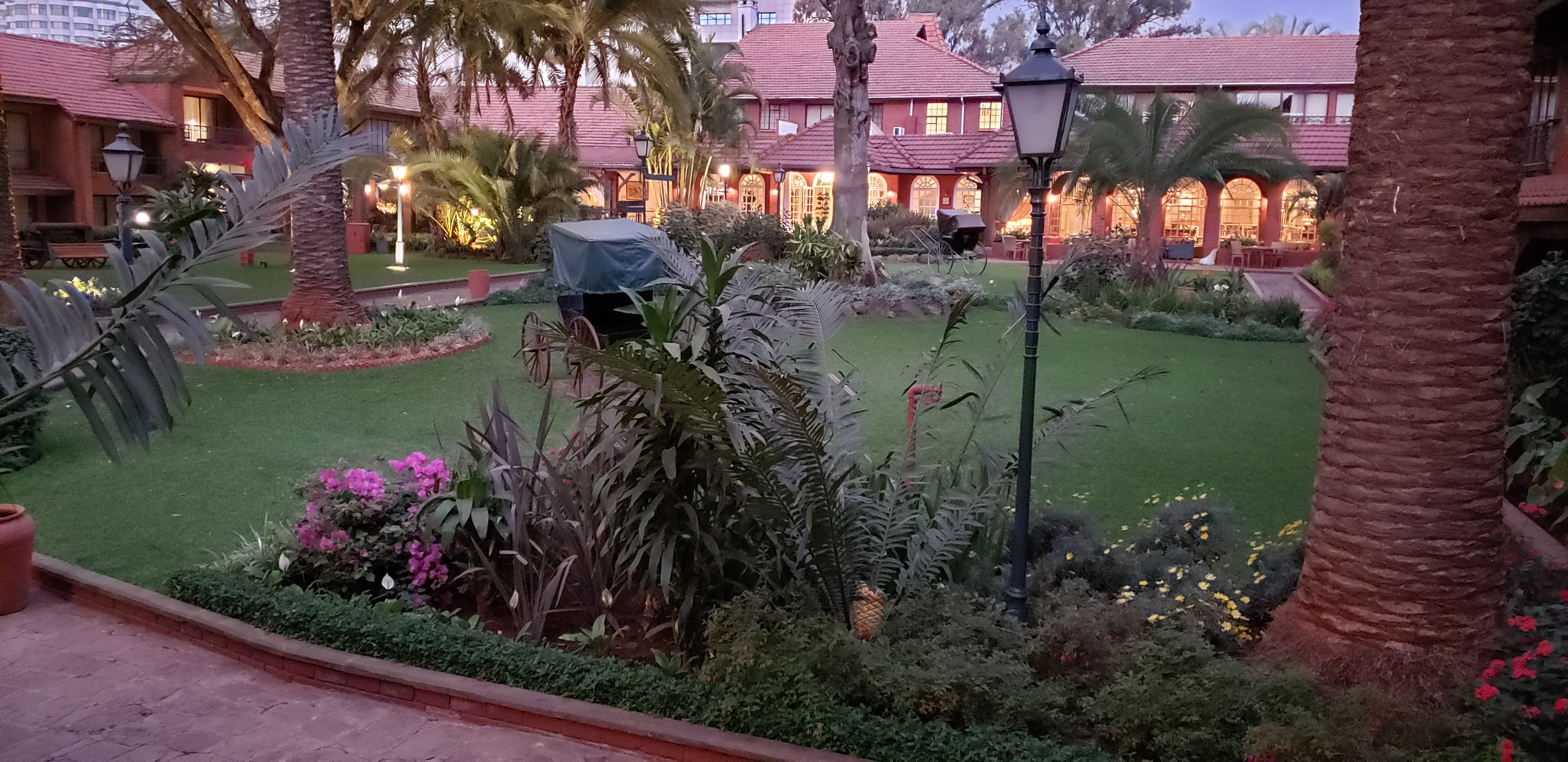
Hotel garden

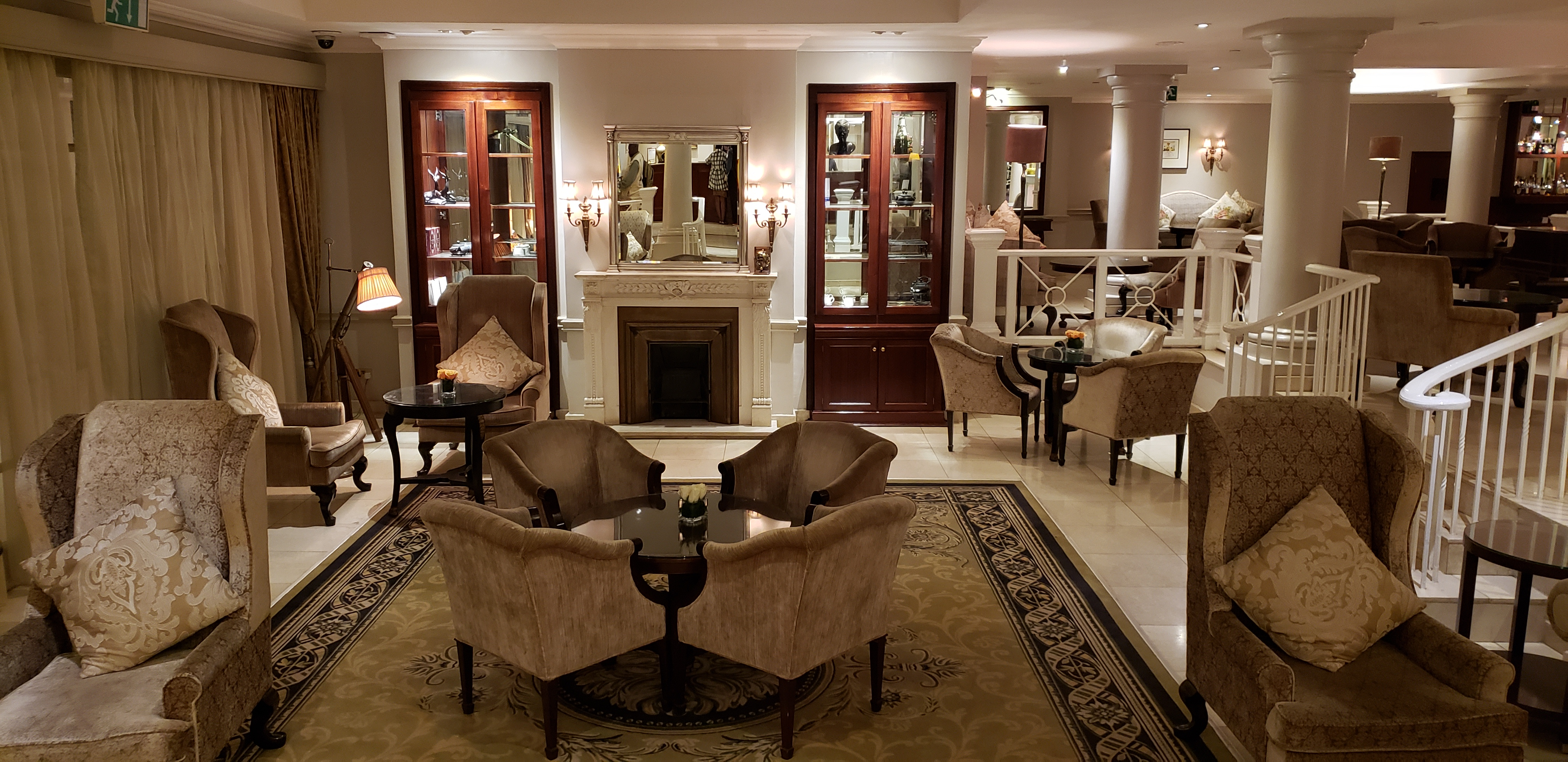
Hotel lobby

The Fairmont Norfolk is a historic hotel in Nairobi, Kenya, and is managed by the luxury hotel chain Fairmont Hotels and Resorts. The hotel has 170 rooms and three restaurants, and consists of five main blocks, each ranging from 1 to 2 stories high. The hotel has a signature Tudor style of architecture that has been maintained since its original construction.

== History ==
The hotel was built by Maj. C.G.R. Ringer and R. Aylmer Winearls, and opened its doors on December 25, 1904, to early settlers seeking refuge from the harsh conditions of Kenya. The hotel advertised itself as being the only stone built and tiled roofed hotel in East Africa, sporting 40 rooms, a billiard room, and French chef. The hotel was the basecamp of early African explorers who ventured to Masai Mara, Kenya's Coast, and the Great Rift Valley. The hotel also served as a centre for famous hunters.

Maj.-Gen. Robert Baden Powell stayed here in Feb. 1906.

In 1909, Theodore Roosevelt stayed at the Norfolk before and after his famous safari, following his retirement as the 26th President of the United States. Other guests in 1909 included Lord Cardross and Cherry Kearton.

Thirty extra rooms were added in 1913, including an arched front entrance and veranda with balcony.

Bror von Blixen-Finecke used the hotel as a base.

In 1923, the hotel was purchased by W.H.E. Edgley. Then in 1927, the hotel was bought by Abraham Block, which contributed to the foundation of the Block Hotel dynasty with the Norfolk as the base.

The East African Professional Hunter's Association was founded at a meeting at the hotel in 1934.

Alan Moorehead stayed at the hotel in 1958 while researching his Nile books.

The hotel was expanded to 170 rooms in 1972.

The famed museum piece “transportation trio” made its home at the Norfolk in 1973, combining hand-drawn, animal-drawn, and machine propelled transportation mechanisms, including a Ford Model A Roadster which is still on the property to this day.

On December 23, 1980, a man named Muradi Akaali booked a room at the property. Keeping to his room for the duration of his stay, he set up a bomb in his hotel room that he evacuated prior to the explosion, which went at 8:30pm the night of December 31. The bomb exploded, where many people died and destroyed the whole western wing of the property. The hotel's New Year's Eve celebration was scheduled to occur three hours after the explosion occurred.

The building was remodeled following the bombing and by 1981, the western wing had risen to the 1st floor and the roof had been retiled as well as the addition of a new restaurant, a ballroom, and 2 function rooms, by 1982. The hotel was featured in the 1985 movie “Out of Africa” starring Meryl Streep and Robert Redford. In 1989, the hotel came under the ownership of Tiny Rowland and became a part of the Signet Hotel Empire. Renovations during this time brought the number of hotel rooms up to 167, an improved reception, Ibis Restaurant, and Pioneer Room, as well as a new business center and gift shop.

In 2004, the hotel was acquired by Kingdom Hotel Investments and placed under management by Fairmont Hotels and Resorts. In 2020 the hotel was sold to Nepalese investment company Chaudhary, just before the Covid-19 pandemic hit the country.

== Famous guests ==
Since its opening, the hotel has seen numerous notable guests including Walter Schirra, David Niven, Richard Burton, Walter Cronkite, Pelé, James Stewart, Michael Caine, Peter Ustinov, Carrie Fisher, Paul Simon, Jackie Stewart, Michael Landon, Sally Field, Mick Jagger, Robert Redford, James McDivitt, Kofi Annan, James Earl Jones, and Sarah, Duchess of York.

== Location ==
Fairmont Norfolk is located on Harry Thuku Road and sits on 4 acres of land. It has its own private tropical garden. The hotel is located near major Kenyan attractions including the National Museums of Kenya, Kenya National Theatre, French Cultural Center, German Cultural Center, Nairobi National Park, Giraffe Center, and the Karen Blixen & Sheldricks Elephant Orphanage.

== Amenities ==
The hotel offers five food and beverage outlets, including:

- Tatu: American steakhouse offering steak and seafood.
- Lord Delamere Terrace: Hotel restaurant featuring classic cuisine and cocktails
- Cin Cin Bar: Wine bar with international labels

The hotel also features a health & fitness center, heated outdoor swimming pool, business center with internet access, and gift shop.
