= John Dawson Ainsworth =

British administrator in East Africa

John Dawson Ainsworth (6 June 1864 – 31 March 1946) was a British administrator in East Africa who played a significant role in the development of the East Africa Protectorate.

== Early life ==
Ainsworth was born in Urmston near Manchester, England in June 1864. His family relocated to Rhys in Wales and here he was educated privately.

== East Africa ==
Ainsworth went to the Congo to trade, and in 1889 he joined the Imperial British East Africa Company (IBEAC) as the Principal Transport Officer. In 1892 he was posted to Machakos to replace George Leith, a drunkard who was hated by the Kamba people who inhabited the region. Ainsworth spent his first twenty months constructing a stone fort and was quickly recognised for his efficiency and ability to provide travelling caravans with fresh milk, fruit and vegetables. From his fort in Machakos, Ainsworth produced approximately 400,000 pounds of food a year for caravans. He also planted a flower garden within the fort, growing mignonettes, nasturtiums and sunflowers. He was assisted at the fort by a garrison of fifty Africans employed by the IBEAC and it was not until October 1894 that he was joined by a fellow European when he was sent C.R.W Lane as an assistant. Ainsworth was able to maintain good relations with the Kamba and developed a personal liking for the tribe. One traveller described his administration as "tactful" and the fort as "homely". He was regarded as being more sympathetic towards Africans than other officials at the time.

In 1903, Ainsworth argued for the creation of reservations for Africans. He believed that land alienation was causing resentment amongst locals and argued Africans would benefit from having their own territory where they could live freely from European settler pressures. He was highly cautious of mixing between Africans and Europeans at the time, noting settler attitudes towards Africans and believing the risk of violence high if such contact was to continue unregulated. Ainsworth was however an advocate of missionaries working with Africans.

In 1912, he recommended a universal scheme of primary education. He believed education was a vital tool to raise the status of Africans and allow them to better understand the conditions and compete within the new society.

Ainsworth developed a reputation amongst European settlers as a pro-native officer. As Provincial Commissioner in Nyanza he promoted African agriculture and stressed the importance in Africans becoming industrious in their own areas. Lord Delamere accused him of turning the Kamba into drunkards and idlers by trying to promote their agricultural development rather than encouraging them to work for wages on European estates.

In 1918 he was appointed Chief Native Commissioner, a move which was opposed by the Convention of Associations. Ainsworth was opposed to the forced labour of Africans and in 1913 claimed that it would have disastrous effects, building up resentment amongst Africans, and making them an intractable and inefficient workforce. On the contrary, Ainsworth believed it important to educate Africans, promoting their economic development and increasing their wants in order to enhance the labour supply. Despite this in 1919 he was criticised by some for his association with the infamous labour circulation in 1919. He resigned from his post in 1920.

== Later life ==
Ainsworth retired in 1920. He returned briefly to Manchester before settling in Somerset West, Cape Town in South Africa. Here he was elected as a councillor in 1927 and as Mayor in 1929. He died in Cape Town on 31 March 1946.

== Personal life ==
During his initial years at Machakos fort, Ainsworth was known to have relationships with Kamba women. In 1897 he married Anne Scott, daughter of American missionaries, at Machakos.
