= The Macomber Affair =

1947 film by Zoltan Korda

- Theatrical release poster
- Directed by: Zoltan Korda
- Screenplay by: Seymour Bennett; Casey Robinson; Adaptation: Frank Arnold
- Based on: The Short Happy Life of Francis Macomber; 1936 Cosmopolitan by Ernest Hemingway
- Produced by: Benedict Bogeaus; Casey Robinson
- Starring: Gregory Peck; Joan Bennett; Robert Preston
- Cinematography: Karl Struss
- Edited by: George Feld; Jack Wheeler
- Music by: Miklós Rózsa
- Production company: Benedict Bogeaus Productions
- Distributed by: United Artists
- Release date: April 20, 1947 (New York City)
- Running time: 89 minutes
- Country: United States
- Language: English
- Box office: $1.6 million

The Macomber Affair is a 1947 American adventure drama film starring Gregory Peck, Joan Bennett, and Robert Preston. Directed by Zoltan Korda and distributed by United Artists, it portrays a fatal love triangle set in British East Africa between a frustrated wife, a weak husband, and the professional hunter who comes between them.

The screenplay was written by Casey Robinson and Seymour Bennett and adapted by Bennett and Frank Arnold, based on "The Short Happy Life of Francis Macomber", the 1936 Ernest Hemingway short story.

The film was re-released in 1952 by Lippert Pictures as The Great White Hunter. (Note: Not to be confused with White Hunter, a 1936 film directed by Irving Cummings.)

== Plot ==
Distraught American Margaret "Margot" Macomber was unhappily married to her American husband, Francis Macomber, when the couple arrived in the Kenya Colony of British East Africa. Now he is dead from a gunshot wound to the back of his head.

As she and their guide, English big-game hunter Robert Wilson, land in Nairobi, Kenya, a flashback dissolves to him and Robert meeting at the Norfolk Hotel to plan their safari over a whiskey.

Francis, a wealthy man, then alienates his wife with his displays of cowardice and physical delicateness while on the trip. Margo is attracted to Robert, so, to prove his masculinity, Francis sets out to kill a lion. He succeeds only in wounding it. Robert insists the animal must be tracked and killed so it will not suffer. When the wounded lion charges, Francis runs and Robert must dispatch it. Francis is repeatedly, and accidentally, emasculated by Robert throughout the day. A furious Margot humiliates her husband by kissing Robert on the lips.

As the couple's animosity grows, Francis is cruel and abusive to an African servant and Robert has to restrain him. The next morning, Francis wounds a cape buffalo with a courageous shot, comes to terms with his physical weaknesses, reconciles with Wilson (to whom he also expresses forgiveness for his wife), and thereby becomes a man. When the wounded cape buffalo charges and is not immediately dropped by shots from Macomber and Wilson, Margot takes aim and shoots. Her bullet strikes Francis dead.

Robert tries to get her to admit that the shot was accidental as Margot prepares to go on trial. It is left unclear whether she intentionally shot her husband or merely feels guilt that the accident validated what was in her heart.

== Cast ==
- Gregory Peck as Robert Wilson
- Joan Bennett as Margaret "Margot" Macomber
- Robert Preston as Francis Macomber
- Reginald Denny as Police Inspector
- Jean Gillie as Aimee
- Carl Harbord as Coroner
- Vernon Downing as Reporter Logan
- Frederick Worlock as Clerk

== Reviews ==
Variety wrote, "African footage is cut into the story with showmanship effect, and these sequences build up suspense satisfactorily", "scenes in which lions and water buffalos charge...will stir any audience." and while it has some "unreal dialogue", the film's "action is often exciting and elements of suspense frequently hop up the spectator;"

Bosley Crowther, in The New York Times, said the film, except for the beginning and the end, was a "quite credible screen telling" of a short story Hemingway felt was one of his best. Crowther also said that "it makes for a tight and absorbing study of character on the screen" if you ignore what the producers added at the beginning and the end. Crowther's review opined that "the contrived conclusion that the guide has fallen in love with the dame and that possibly the shooting was accidental is completely stupid and false".

Time magazine said it was "a brilliantly good job—the best yet—of bringing Hemingway to the screen."
