= The Short Happy Life of Francis Macomber =

Short story by Ernest Hemingway set in Africa

Illustration by Dean Cornwell in September 1936's Cosmopolitan accompanied by the first publication of the story

"The Short Happy Life of Francis Macomber" is a short story by Ernest Hemingway. Set in Africa, it was published in the September 1936 issue of Cosmopolitan magazine. The story was eventually adapted to the screen as the Zoltan Korda film The Macomber Affair (1947).

== Synopsis ==
"The Short Happy Life of Francis Macomber" is a third-person limited omniscient narrative with moments of unreliable interior monologue presented mainly through the points of view of the two leading male characters, Francis Macomber and Robert Wilson. There are also occasional insights from the big game themselves.

Francis Macomber and his wife Margot are on a big-game safari In Africa. It is learned from the white, professional hunter and guide, Robert Wilson, that the "gun-bearers" and "personal boys" speak Swahili and sometimes receive illegal lashings. Earlier, Francis had panicked when a wounded lion charged him, and Margot mocks him for his cowardice. Wilson is critical of Macomber, presented in interior monologue, but outwardly tries to shepherd him toward a more accepted "code" practiced by experienced hunters. This is Francis' thirty-five-year-old "coming of age" story.

In a flash-back, Francis runs from his wounded and charging lion, dispatched by a scornful Wilson. It is also shown that Margot cheated on him with Wilson on the night after. Though Macomber hates Wilson, he seems to "need" him. As Wilson puts it, this is Francis' chance to come of age, to become a man.

The next day, the party hunts Cape buffalo. Macomber and Wilson hunt together and shoot three, killing two but merely wounding the first, which retreats into the bush. Macomber experiences a rush of confidence, saying that it felt "as though a dam within him had burst." While Macomber is jubilant, Margot also senses his renewed sense of vitality and is sullen.

The gun-bearers report that the first buffalo has not died and has gone into the tall grass. Wilson refocuses on Macomber and helps him track the wounded buffalo, ominously paralleling the previous day's lion hunt. This time, however, Macomber approaches the hunt in earnest, without any of the fear he displayed before.

When they find the buffalo, it charges Macomber. He stands his ground and fires, but his shots are too high, impacting the bone shield across the top of the animal's head (the "boss"). Wilson shoots as well, but the buffalo keeps charging. At the same time, Margot fires a shot from the car, which hits Macomber in the head and kills him.

Wilson is furious, noting that he would report it as an accident, but heavily indicating that Margot intentionally killed her husband because she knew he would divorce her.

== Publication history ==
"The Short Happy Life of Francis Macomber" was published in the September 1936 issue of Cosmopolitan and later in The Fifth Column and the First Forty-Nine Stories (1938).

== Major themes ==
The essence of "The Short Happy Life of Francis Macomber" is the contrast of courage and fear. Mellow described the story as "one of Hemingway’s classic studies of fear". Macomber hears the roar of a lion and is unnerved because he has never "heard, as Hemingway pointedly states, the Somali proverb that says, 'a brave man is always frightened three times by a lion: when he first sees his track, when he first hears him roar, when he first confronts him'. Or in Somali ‘Saddex jeer ayuu ninku libaaxa ka cabsadaa: markuu raadkiisa arko, markuu reenkiisa maqlo, markuu runtiisa la kulmo’. Hemingway explains, Macomber is afraid of the lion’s roar and unnerved by his fear because "he did not know the Somali proverb."

Wilson has courage but Macomber, who is afraid of lions, has none. When the cowardly husband, whose wife had made her way from Wilson's tent hours before, finds the courage to face the charging buffalo, he forges the identity he wants: the courage to face both wild animals and his wife. Tragically, Macomber's happiness is measured in hours, and indeed in minutes. Hemingway biographer Carlos Baker opines that Macomber loses his fear as the buffalo charges, and the loss of fear ushers Macomber into manhood, which Margot instantly kills.

Baker suggests that Wilson symbolizes the man free of woman (because he refuses to allow Margot to dominate him) or of fear; the man Macomber wishes to be. Wilson understands, as he blasts the lion dead, that Margot is a woman who needs to be dominated. Jeffrey Meyers considers Margot Macomber to be the villain of the story. She characterises "a predatory (rather than a passive) female who is both betrayer and murderer"; and she emphasizes a connection between "shooting and sex."

Francis Macomber has lived most of his adult life under the manipulative and domineering influence of Margot. He cannot bring himself to face her and assert his leadership in their marriage, allowing her to step all over him. The text implies that the affair with Wilson is not the first time Margot has cheated on her husband. Macomber, fleeing from the lion, is unimpressive when compared with Wilson, the seasoned hunter and safari-veteran, cool and collected in the face of danger.

The loss of Macomber's manhood in the encounter with the lion mirrors the blow he takes when Margot blatantly cheats on him. This appears to push him over the edge. Macomber translates his fury into the intensity of the hunt. He experiences rising confidence and bravery during the hunt, as he seeks to take back the manhood he never found.

Macomber's transformation is symbolized at the beginning with Macomber's offering the group "lime juice or lemon squash". But at the end of the buffalo hunt, he and Wilson toast their success in whiskey. Macomber progresses from a timid rabbit drinking juice, to a hunter, downing more masculine hard liquor.

Hemingway also employs animals as symbols in "The Short Happy Life". Macomber is referenced as a rabbit, and one of his kills is described as one of "the big cowy things that jump like hares". His conquests are gentle animals, easily frightened. In contrast, Margot is described as "predatory", like a lion. The comparison to Macomber’s cowardice during the hunt is clear: Macomber the rabbit runs from his wife, a lion. Building his courage is catalyzed by Macomber's hot rage, an experience associated with the lion. At the end, Macomber lies dead, mirroring the posture of the buffalo he has shot. Wilson compliments the dead creature as a "hell of a good bull", implying that Macomber is finally worthy of respect by right of the beast he has conquered.

Margot is disturbed by Macomber's sudden confidence and assertion of his manhood, feeling her dominance threatened. His exhilaration after the buffalo hunt unnerves her. But with Macomber's transition from boy to man comes death. Hemingway offers his perspective on happiness: however brief, even a moment of confident happiness is enough to validate one's life.

It is no coincidence that Margot is the one who kills him. The unresolved debate is whether she murdered or accidentally killed Macomber. If she purposefully shoots him, she has preserved her dominance and ensures that she will keep his wealth (possibly the only reason she married him).

If the shot is accidental, the moment is tender, as well as tragic. She has just observed her husband become a man, and though she fears the end of their relationship, she is invigorated with energy to start afresh. Margot picks up the gun to defend her husband, trying to save him in the face of danger. For once, husband and wife are both on the same side, shooting at the same bull. It is tragically ironic that she kills the man she is trying to save, but such is Hemingway's commentary on life. The sweetest moments are short-lived.

A third interpretation of Margot's shot is that she is trying to regain dominance over her husband by killing the bull herself. If this is the case, she wins back her power, but destroys the thing she is trying to control. The bullet accomplishes exactly what she was trying to avoid.

== Reception ==
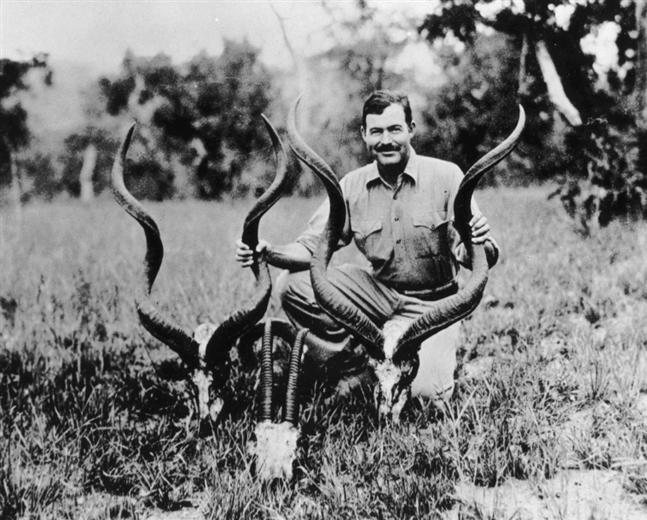
Ernest Hemingway poses with trophy kudu heads in Africa, February 1934. JFK Library

"The Short Happy Life of Francis Macomber" has been acclaimed as one of Hemingway's most successful artistic achievements. The characters are ambiguously complex, which has generated vigorous debate over their motivations. In the estimation of critic Kenneth G. Johnston, "the prevailing critical view is that she deliberately—or at best, 'accidentally on purpose'—murdered him", but there are many, including Johnston himself, who hold the opposite view.

Hemingway scholar Carlos Baker calls Margot Macomber "easily the most unscrupulous of Hemingway's fictional females"; a woman "who is really and literally deadly" and who "covets her husband's money but values even more her power over him." Literary critic and early mentor to Hemingway Edmund Wilson observed bluntly, "The men in …these African stories are married to American bitches of the most soul-destroying sort." Other authors who hold similar views regarding Margot include Philip Young, Leslie A. Fiedler and Frank O'Connor.

One question is whether Hemingway intended Robert Wilson as a heroic figure, embodying his ideal of the courageous, hyper-masculine male. Critics who argue for Margot's innocence are likely to doubt this view of Wilson. Margot's intention is challenged by Wilson when he asks after the shooting "Why didn't you poison him? That's what they do in England." If Wilson is intended to be the voice of morality, then the accusation is damning. But if Wilson is a less-perfect character himself, then his judgment of Margot is suspect because Wilson chased down the buffalo in a car, violating the law and perhaps also Hemingway's code of hunting fairness. Kenneth G. Johnston argues that Wilson "has much to gain by making Mrs. Macomber believe that the death of her husband could be construed as murder," since he could lose his license if Margot accurately described Wilson's use of the car in the buffalo hunt.

In The Lonely Voice: A Study of the Short Story, author and literary critic Frank O'Connor, though generally an admirer of Hemingway, gives a colorful and uncharitable summation of "The Short Happy Life":

Francis runs away from a lion, which is what most sensible men would do if faced by a lion, and his wife promptly cuckolds him with the English manager of their big-game hunting expedition. As we all know, good wives admire nothing in a husband except his capacity to deal with lions, so we can sympathize with the poor woman in her trouble. But next day Macomber, faced with a buffalo, suddenly becomes a man of superb courage, and his wife, recognizing that[...] for the future she must be a virtuous wife, blows his head off. [...] To say that the psychology of this story is childish would be to waste good words. As farce it ranks with Ten Nights in a Bar Room or any other Victorian morality you can think of. Clearly, it is the working out of a personal problem that for the vast majority of men and women has no validity whatever.

== See also ==
- John Henry Patterson (author), Anglo-Irish military officer, hunter and author, present on a 1908 safari involving the death of a client
- Philip Percival, British big-game hunter, an associate of Hemingway said to be a basis for Robert Wilson
- Bror von Blixen-Finecke, Swedish nobleman and big-game hunter, another associate of Hemingway said to be a basis for Robert Wilson

== Bibliography ==
- Baker, Carlos (1972). Hemingway: The Writer as Artist (4th ed.). Princeton University Press. ISBN 0-691-01305-5.
- Meyers, Jeffrey (1985). Hemingway: A Biography. London: Macmillan. ISBN 0-333-42126-4.
- Stoltzfus, Ben (2005). "Sartre, "Nada," and Hemingway's African Stories". Comparative Literature Studies. 42 (3): 205–228. doi:10.1353/cls.2006.0010. S2CID 163154056.
- Wilson, Edmund (1941). Hemingway: Gauge of Morale. In Literary Essays and Reviews of the 1930s & 40s: The Triple Thinkers, The Wound and the Bow, Classics and Commercials, Uncollected Reviews Lewis M. Dabney, ed.(2007).
- Bender, Bert. "Margot Macomber’s Gimlet." College Literature. 8.1 (1981): 13. JSTOR. College Literature. Web. 3 December 2011. JSTOR 25111356.
- Gaillard, Jr., Theodore. “The Critical Menagerie in ‘The Short Happy Life of Francis Macomber.’” The English Journal. 60.1 (1971): 31–35. National Council of Teachers of English. Web. 3 December 2011 JSTOR 813335.
- Catalano, Susan M. "Henpecked to heroism: placing Rip Van Winkle and Francis Macomber in the American renegade tradition." The Hemingway Review 17.2 (1998): 111+. 3 December 2011.
- Baker, Sheridan Warner. "Green Hills and the Gulf." Ernest Hemingway; an Introduction and Interpretation. New York: Holt, Rinehart and Winston, 1967. 99. Print.
