= Harry Selby (hunter) =

South African professional hunter (1925–2018)

John Henry Selby (22 July 1925 – 20 January 2018) was an African professional hunter who made a name for himself in Kenya and then in Bechuanaland. Selby honed his hunting skills early in life while working for the Safariland safari company and under the tutelage of legendary hunter Philip Percival. During his time with Ker & Downey Safaris, he also met and befriended Robert Ruark, whose subsequent writings about safaris he did with Selby made Selby famous around the world.

== Early life ==
Born in Frankfort, Free State, South Africa, Selby was very young when his family moved to Kenya. His parents had acquired 40,000 acres of prime ranch land – with a view of Mount Kenya - where they grazed cattle. The land was also home to big game, and as a child he was surrounded by herds of zebra, eland and impala. From time to time groups of buffalo and elephant passed through the property, and occasionally lions or leopard. The presence of the big cats would spark a hunt in order to protect the livestock, and at the age of just eight years old he was entrusted with his own single-shot .22 rifle.

Selby's early pursuits kept the family's larder stocked with guinea fowl, francolin and gazelle and it was during these times that he perfected his gun handling skills. He became familiar with dangerous game while hunting smaller game on the slopes of Mount Kenya. He hunted with experienced local trackers; expert hunters in their own right who would pursue even the largest game with bow and arrow.

== Hunting career ==
Selby's career as a hunter emerged from a job as a field mechanic for Philip Percival, a veteran East African white hunter. However, it was not long before Percival realized that Selby's personable nature and considerable big game experience would be invaluable on safari. Percival took Selby on as his apprentice, and by the time Selby turned 22 he was already well on his way to becoming one of Africa's most respected professional hunters.

=== Robert Ruark ===
In 1949, when Harry was just 24, he joined Ker & Downey Safaris Ltd. Two years later he was teamed with a guest who was to change his life. Robert Ruark was an American newspaper columnist who flew to Africa to fulfil a lifelong dream to go on safari. He was so enthralled that he wrote a book called Horn of the Hunter which Field and Stream magazine called "very arguably, the best book on African hunting ever written". It also put Harry's name in the history books, and created a demand to hunt with Selby so great that he became fully booked years in advance.

In 1955 Ruark wrote a subsequent book called Something of Value, a fictional novel influenced by Harry's colonial Kenyan childhood and his Professional Hunter exploits. The attention placed great pressure on Harry, who later commented that creating his reputation was easy – maintaining it for 40 years was the hard part.

=== Moving to Botswana ===
By 1962 the future of hunting in Kenya was looking uncertain. Selby had been offered a directorship in what became Ker, Downey & Selby Safaris, and he agreed to open a new venture in Bechuanaland. He recognised the area's tremendous potential and in 1963 he, his wife and two children moved to Maun to begin a new chapter in their lives.

The company leased a vast 12,000 km² concession on the northwest edge of Botswana, near Chobe National Park. The principal landmark of the area is the Khwai River, and he could not resist building a bridge over it just a couple of years later. In 1970, fuelled by the burgeoning interest in East African photo safaris, Selby built Belmond Khwai River Lodge, the first photographic lodge in Botswana to cater to overseas photo safari tourism.

In 1997, after completing his 53rd safari season, Selby throttled back from the demands of full-season hunting, and finally retired from professional hunting in 2000 at the age of 75.

Harry Selby died in Maun, Botswana on 20 January 2018 at the age of 92.
