= White hunter =

Term used for professional big-game hunters

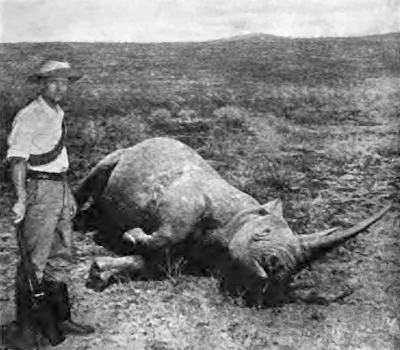
Fritz Duquesne, of the Boer Army, having shot a black rhinoceros, circa 1900

White hunter is a literary term used for professional big game hunters of European descent who plied their trade in Africa, especially during the first half of the 20th century. The activity continues in the dozen African countries which still permit big-game hunting. White hunters derived their income from organizing and leading safaris for paying clients, or from the sale of ivory.

The term "great white hunter" emphasizes the racial and colonial aspects of the profession, as well as its colorful aspects. Depending on the author and intention, the term can be used straightforwardly, in parody, or as a criticism.

== Hunting in Africa ==
White men from Western countries had been hunting big game in Africa throughout the 19th century, particularly in the more settled southern portion of the continent. But the region most associated with the term "white hunters" is East Africa. By the start of the 20th century, as part of the "scramble for Africa", European colonial powers had taken possession of territories on the eastern half of the continent—territories now recognized as the nations of Kenya, Rwanda, Uganda, and Tanzania.

There were many factors that led to the spread of big-game hunting in East Africa, but two were foremost among them: first, a romantic European conception of hunting that combined aristocratic privilege and sportsmanship, and second, the desire by the colonizing powers to create new agricultural economies, to which unchecked animal populations posed a serious threat.

Although the origins of the phrase cannot be confirmed, the first European to go by the title of "white hunter" is generally considered to have been Alan Black. Black was hired in the 1890s by Lord Delamere. Delamere employed both Alan Black and a native Somali hunter to lead safaris in Somaliland. As the story goes, in order to avoid confusion, the Somali was referred to as the "black hunter", and Black was called the "white hunter".

== Rise of the hunting safari ==
R. J. Cunninghame in 1909

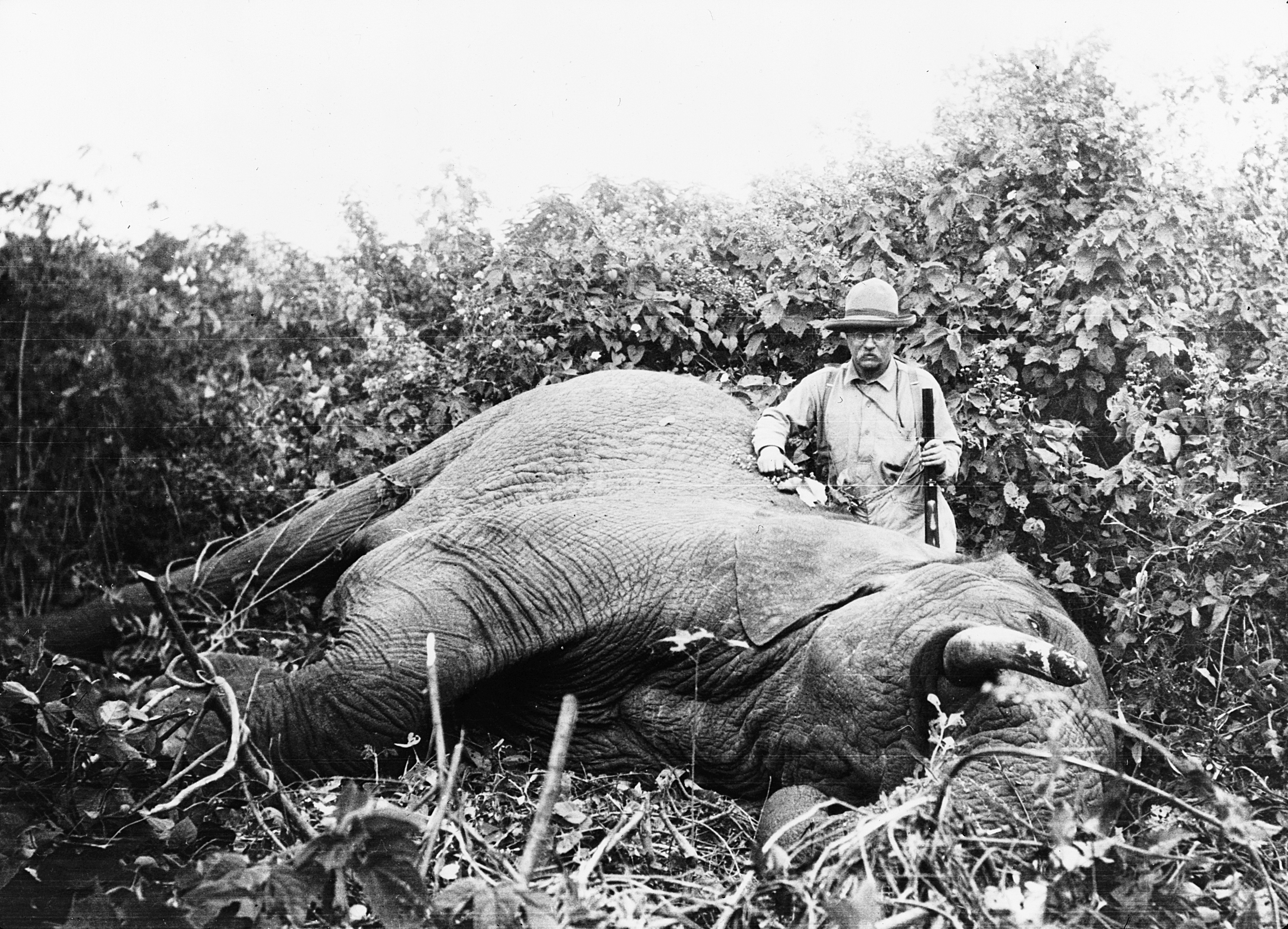
Former U.S. President Theodore Roosevelt's 1909 hunting trip helped popularize the African safari.

Around the start of the 20th century, East African hunting safaris became a fashionable pursuit among members of the privileged classes, particularly in Britain and the United States. The completion of the Uganda Railway in 1901 provided easier access to the interior highlands of British East Africa (also known then as the East African Protectorate, and now as Kenya), where large game, especially elephants, lions, Cape buffalo, and rhinoceroses, was plentiful. The white hunter served these paying customers as guide, teacher, and protector.

Typically, the hunter was hired or booked by an outfitting company (the first and most famous of these was Newland, Tarlton & Co. in Nairobi); the outfitter would make the local arrangements, gathering and packing supplies and hiring the many African workers without whom a safari was impossible. Porters, tent attendants, armed guards (known as askaris), horse-trainers, and gun-bearers all worked under the supervision of a "headman". Before the mass importation of motor vehicles, most safaris traveled on foot and horseback and could employ anywhere from 50 to several hundred African workers.

The British colonial government also turned big-game hunting into a source of revenue, charging the tourists and hunters licensing fees for permission to kill the game animals. In 1909, a £50 hunting license (equivalent to £5,100 in 2025) in the East Africa Protectorate entitled its purchaser to kill two buffaloes, two hippos, one eland, 22 zebras, six oryxes, four waterbucks, one greater kudu, four lesser kudus, 10 topis, 26 hartebeests, 229 other antelope, 84 colobus monkeys, and unlimited lions and leopards (lions and leopards killed livestock and were classified as vermin).

== Notable examples ==
White hunters were colorful and romantic figures, often from privileged English backgrounds, who embraced a life of danger and adventure. The first acclaimed white hunters in East Africa were Alan Black, Bill Judd, Frederick Selous (remembered as the namesake of the Selous Scouts and whose real-life adventures inspired Sir H. Rider Haggard to create the fictional Allan Quatermain), and R.J. Cunninghame (sometimes spelled Cuningham), all of whom began their exploits at the end of the 19th century. In 1909 Cunninghame was selected to lead what was probably the best-publicized African safari, Theodore Roosevelt's excursion into British East Africa. Roosevelt's fame and popularity, and his gift for generating publicity, prompted a craze for safaris among those who could afford the sizeable price tag. After the First World War, when most of German East Africa was ceded to Britain, eager customers poured into Africa, creating a market for the skills of several more decades of hunters.

Among the better-known white hunters who succeeded Cunninghame's generation were W. D. M. Bell, later known as "Karamoja" Bell; Bror von Blixen-Finecke, who was, between 1914 and 1926, married to Out of Africa author Karen Blixen; Denys Finch-Hatton, later her lover; Frederick Russell Burnham, Chief of Scouts in the Second Boer War to Lord Roberts and known as "England's American Scout"; John A. Hunter; and Philip Percival and Frank M. "Bunny" Allen, whose safaris with Ernest Hemingway led the author to write Green Hills of Africa, True at First Light, "The Short Happy Life of Francis Macomber," and "The Snows of Kilimanjaro."

== Representations in literature and film ==
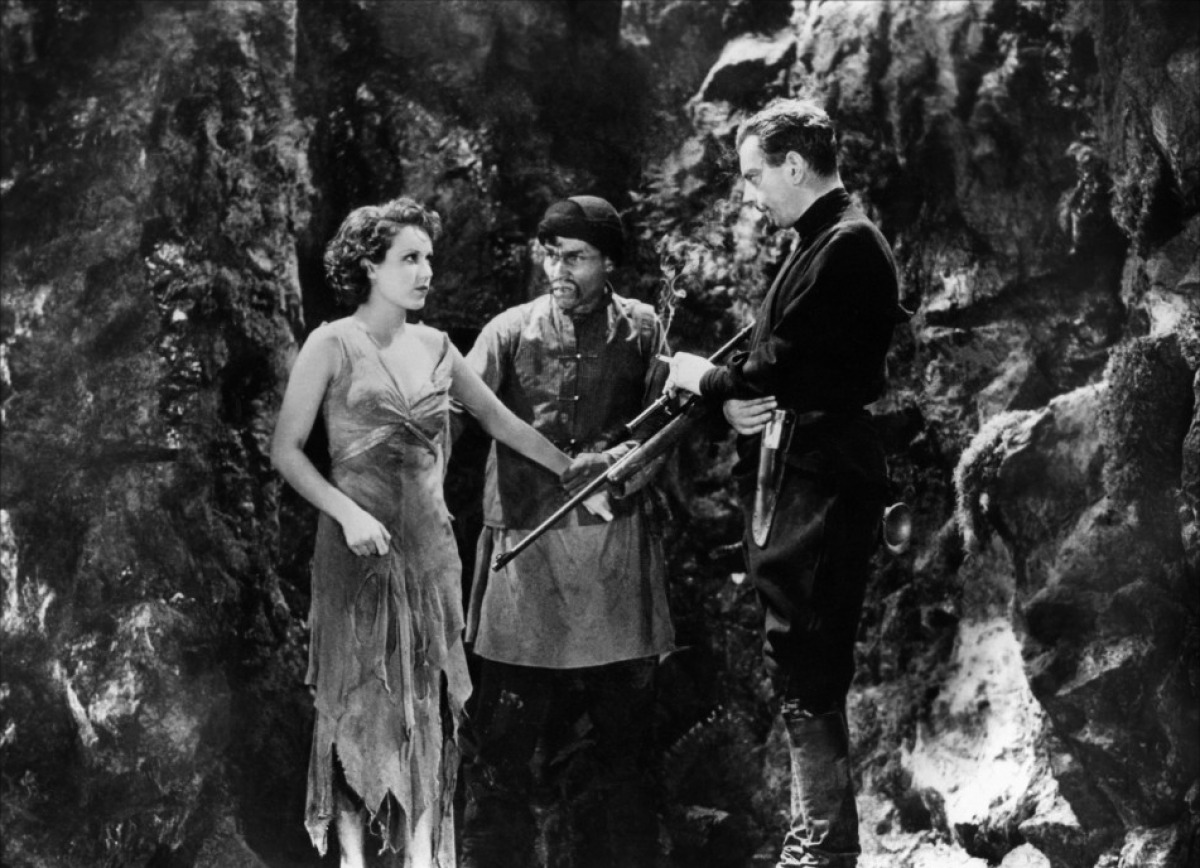
Leslie Banks (right) as Count Zaroff in a film adaptation of "The Most Dangerous Game"

The exploits of white hunters were subjects first for novels and later for films. They were romanticized in adventure novels of the so-called "Lost World/Lost Race" genre.

Perhaps the first fictional Victorian adventure hero was Allan Quatermain, a white hunter who appeared in books by H. Rider Haggard, starting with King Solomon's Mines (1885). In 1924, Richard Connell published his short story "The Most Dangerous Game", in which an American big-game hunter finds himself being hunted by a Russian aristocrat who has tired of hunting in Africa. Alex Raymond created the Jungle Jim comic strip in 1934 that later lead to a comic book, film serial, film series, and television show. Geoffrey Household's novel Rogue Male (1939) featured a white hunter going after Adolf Hitler; it was filmed twice, first as Man Hunt (1941) and, a generation later, under the original title (1976). Captain C. G. Biggar (Cuthbert Gervase 'Bwana' Brabazon-Biggar), a supporting character in the P. G. Wodehouse comic novel Ring for Jeeves (1953), is another example of the white hunter.

Not surprisingly, actual white hunters were often involved in the filming of the exploits of their fictional counterparts: Bunny Allen led many film companies on safari to enable location filming for King Solomon's Mines, Mogambo (1953), and Nor the Moon by Night (1958). The white hunter on safari in his khakis and pith helmet became an instantly recognizable stock character.

Abbott and Costello lampooned the type in Africa Screams (1949), which was a parody of a 1930 documentary, Africa Speaks! (1930). Bob Hope parodied the safari genre in Road to Zanzibar (1941) and Call Me Bwana (1963).

Hemingway's safari story "The Short Happy Life of Francis Macomber" (1936) richly addresses the questions of courage, cowardice, racism, and power on safari. The story was made into a film titled The Macomber Affair (1947), but it was reissued in the United States under the title, The Great White Hunter. The title character is an American tourist looking to find his own courage by facing danger on safari. In the story, Hemingway accurately refers to the professional hunter leading the safari, a character named Wilson, as a "white hunter". (Wilson is said to have been based on Hemingway's own guides, Philip Percival and Bror von Blixen-Finecke).

In Congo (1995), Ernie Hudson introduces himself as the unexpectedly black "white hunter" hired to guide a jungle expedition.

== Origins ==
The phrase "great white hunter" probably has its origins in these popular depictions of safari adventures. Peter Capstick, a white hunter and an author of books on the subject, suggested that the word "great" may have been added by American popular culture. It was not a term employed or embraced by the hunters themselves. Its meaning, like many labels from the colonial era, is now shaded with parody or derision: it came to symbolize a perceived arrogance of western colonial powers toward the less developed parts of the world they controlled before the dismemberment of their empires after World War II.
