= Professional hunter =

Person who hunts and/or manages game by profession

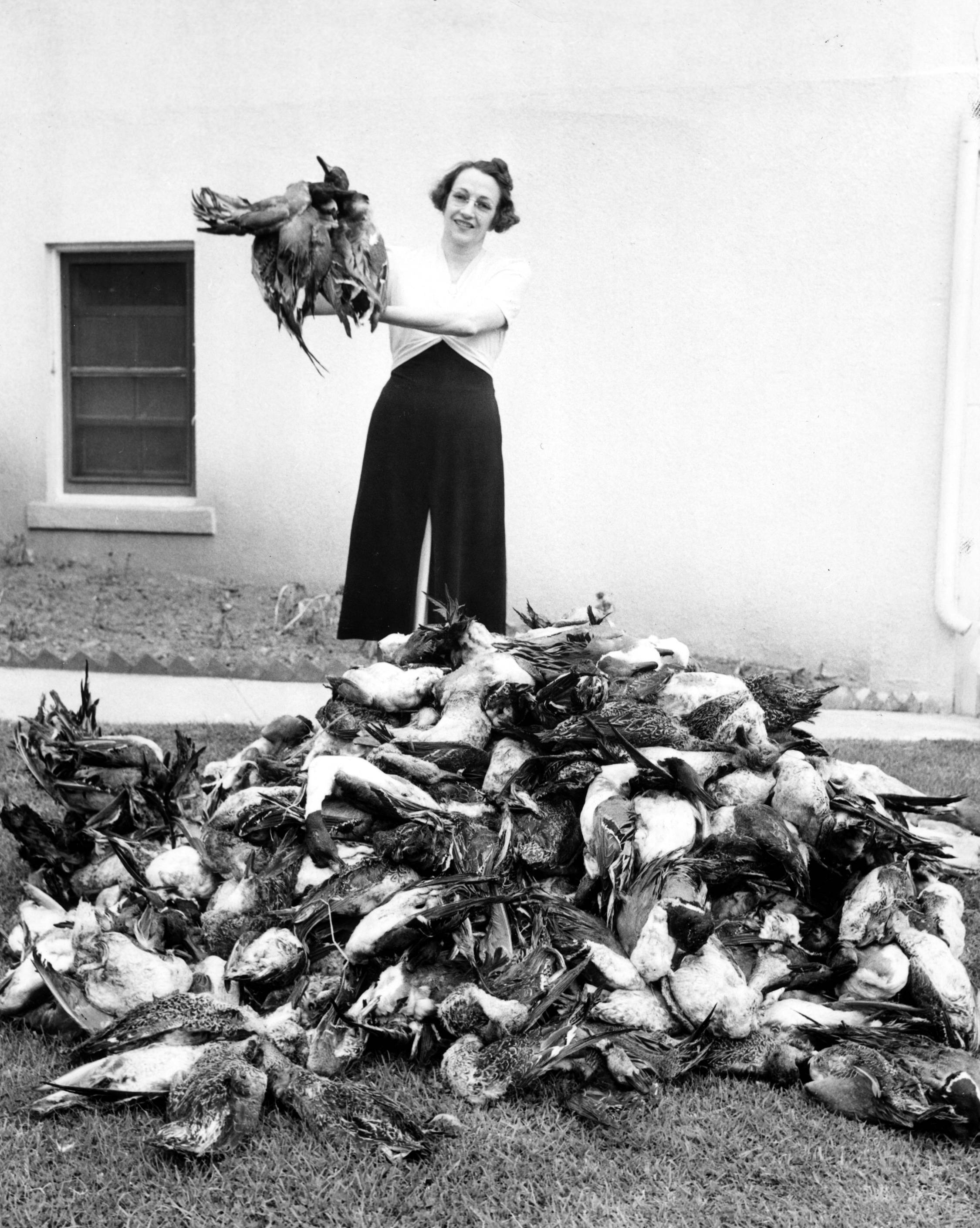
Market hunting almost obliterated waterfowl populations across the East Coast of the United States in the 1930s.

A professional hunter (less frequently referred to as market or commercial hunter and regionally, especially in Britain and Ireland, as professional stalker or gamekeeper) is a person who hunts and/or manages game by profession.

== Description ==
Some professional hunters work in the private sector or for government agencies and manage species that are considered overabundant, others are self-employed and make a living by selling hides and meat, while still others guide clients on big-game hunts.

== Australia ==
In Australia several million kangaroos are shot each year by licensed professional hunters in population control programmes, with both their meat and hides sold.

== Germany ==
German professional hunters (Berufsjäger or Berufsjägerinnen depending on gender) mostly work for large private forest estates and for state-owned forest enterprises, where they control browsing by reducing the numbers of ungulates like roe deer or chamois, manage populations of sought-after trophy species like red deer and act as hunting guides for paying clients.

== Southern and Eastern Africa ==
Historically, professional big-game hunters of European descent who plied their trade in Africa, especially during the first half of the 20th century, are often referred to as "white hunters" or "great white hunters". The countries of Southern and Eastern Africa, especially Namibia, South Africa, Tanzania and Zimbabwe, are major destinations for big-game hunting tourism in Africa. Local professional hunters, often simply referred to as PH, act as hunting guides for paying guest hunters and manage safari hunting businesses.

== United Kingdom ==
British professional stalkers and gamekeepers primarily work on large estates, especially in the Scottish Highlands, where they most commonly manage red deer, common pheasant, red grouse and French partridge. Early in the 20th century there were an estimated 25,000 professional stalkers and gamekeepers employed in the UK, while today there are some 3000.

== United States ==
=== Unregulated hunting in the 19th and early 20th century ===
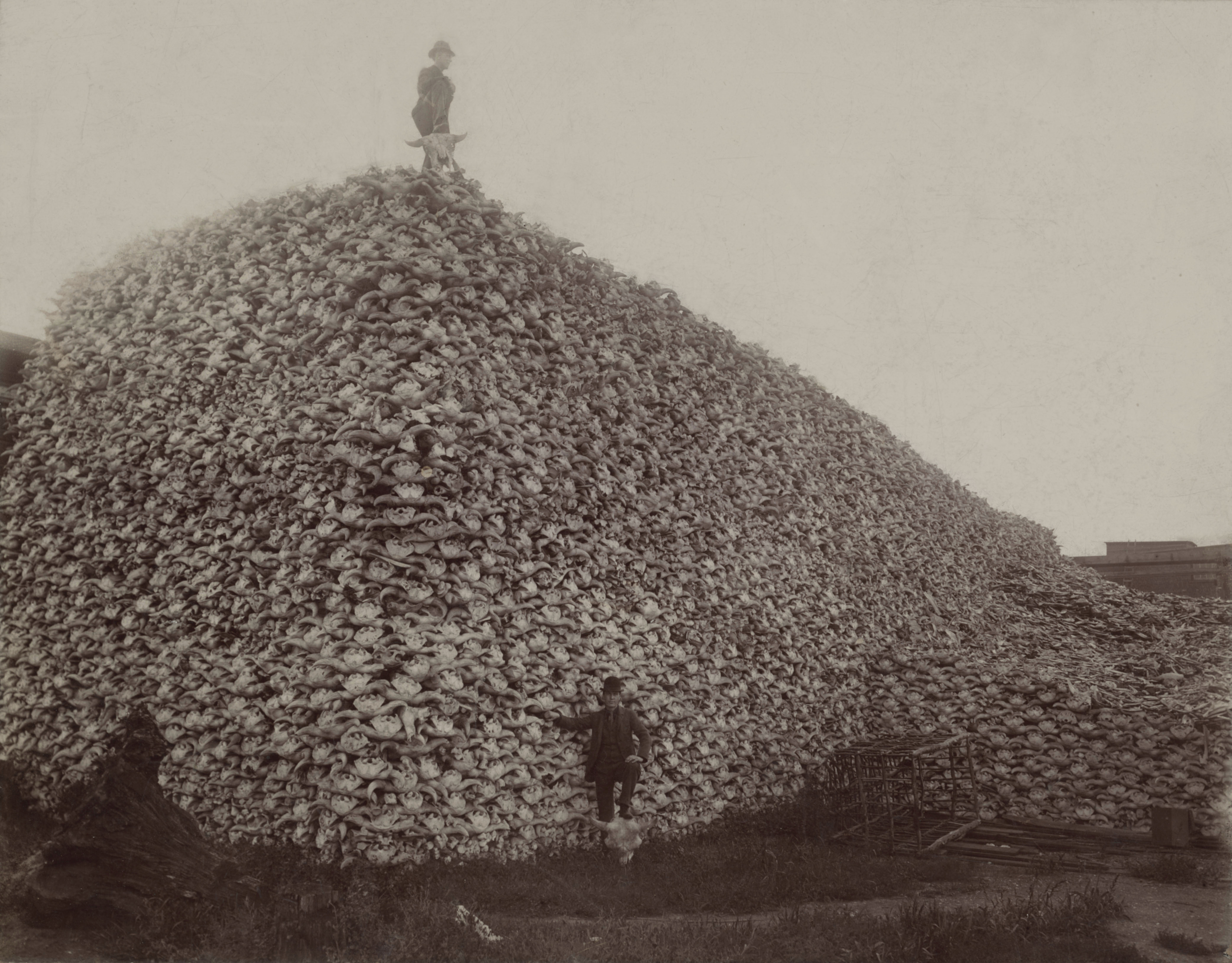
American bison were hunted almost to extinction in the late 19th century primarily by market hunters and were reduced to a few hundred by the mid-1880s

In a North American context the terms market hunter and commercial hunter are predominantly used to refer to hunters of the 19th and early 20th century who sold or traded the flesh, bones, skins and feathers of slain animals as a source of income. These hunters focused on species which gathered in large numbers for breeding, feeding, or migration and were organized into factory-like groups that would systematically depopulate an area of any valuable wildlife over a short period of time. The animals which were hunted included bison, deer, ducks and other waterfowl, geese, pigeons and many other birds, seals and walruses, fish, river mussels, and clams.

Populations of large birds were severely depleted through the 19th and early 20th century. The extermination of several species and the threatened loss of others caused popular legislation effectively prohibiting this form of commercial hunting in the United States. Hunting seasons were eventually established to conserve surviving wildlife and allow a certain amount of recovery and re-population to occur. The Migratory Bird Treaty Act signed in 1918 regulated hunting and prohibited all hunting of wood ducks until 1941 and swans until 1962.

=== Federal and States agencies ===
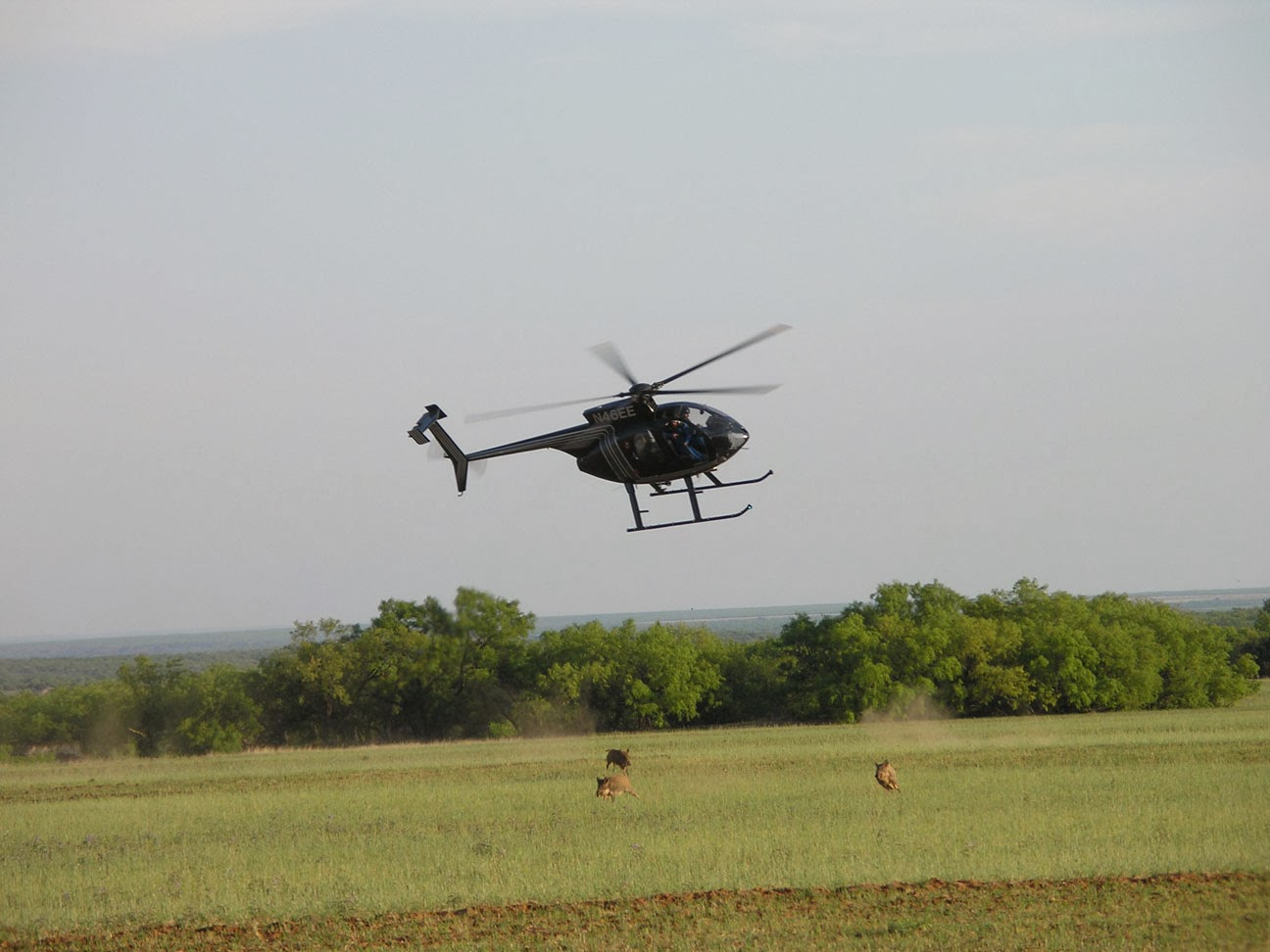
Aerial shooting of feral pigs from a helicopter by the Texas Wildlife Services

Agencies like the federal Wildlife Services (not to be confused with the United States Fish and Wildlife Service), part of the United States Department of Agriculture’s Animal and Plant Health Inspection Service (APHIS), and its equivalents on the state level employ professional hunters for lethal as well as non-lethal control of wildlife, for example, dealing with wildlife preying on livestock (or humans) and engaging in bird control to prevent bird strikes. The federal Wildlife Services alone has a staff of around 750 professional hunters. It works on around 565 airports around the United States to identify and reduce threats posed by bird strikes.

== See also ==
- Poaching – Illegal hunting or fishing of wildlife
- Trapping – Use of a device to remotely catch an animal
- Wildlife management – Management and control of wildlife populations

== Sources ==
- Dickson, Barney., Hutton, Jonathan., Adams, W. M. (2009). Recreational Hunting, Conservation and Rural Livelihoods. (= Conservation Science and Practice). Wiley-Blackwell, ISBN 9781444303179.
- Gissibl, B. (2016). The conservation of luxury: Safari hunting and the consumption of wildlife in twentieth-century East Africa. In K. Hofmeester & B. Grewe (Eds.), Luxury in Global Perspective: Objects and Practices, 1600–2000 (Studies in Comparative World History, pp. 263–300). Cambridge University Press. doi:10.1017/9781316257913.011.
- Jacoby, Karl (2001). Crimes against Nature: Squatters, Poachers, Thieves, and the Hidden History of American Conservation. Berkeley: University of California Press, ISBN 9780520282292.
- Lovelock, Brent (2007). Tourism and the consumption of wildlife: hunting, shooting and sport fishing. London: Routledge. ISBN 978-0-203-93432-6.
- van der Merwe, Peet; du Plessis, Lindie (2014). Game farming and hunting tourism. African Sun Media. ISBN 978-0-9922359-1-8.
