= Safari =

Journey to hunt safari animals or to observe or photograph them

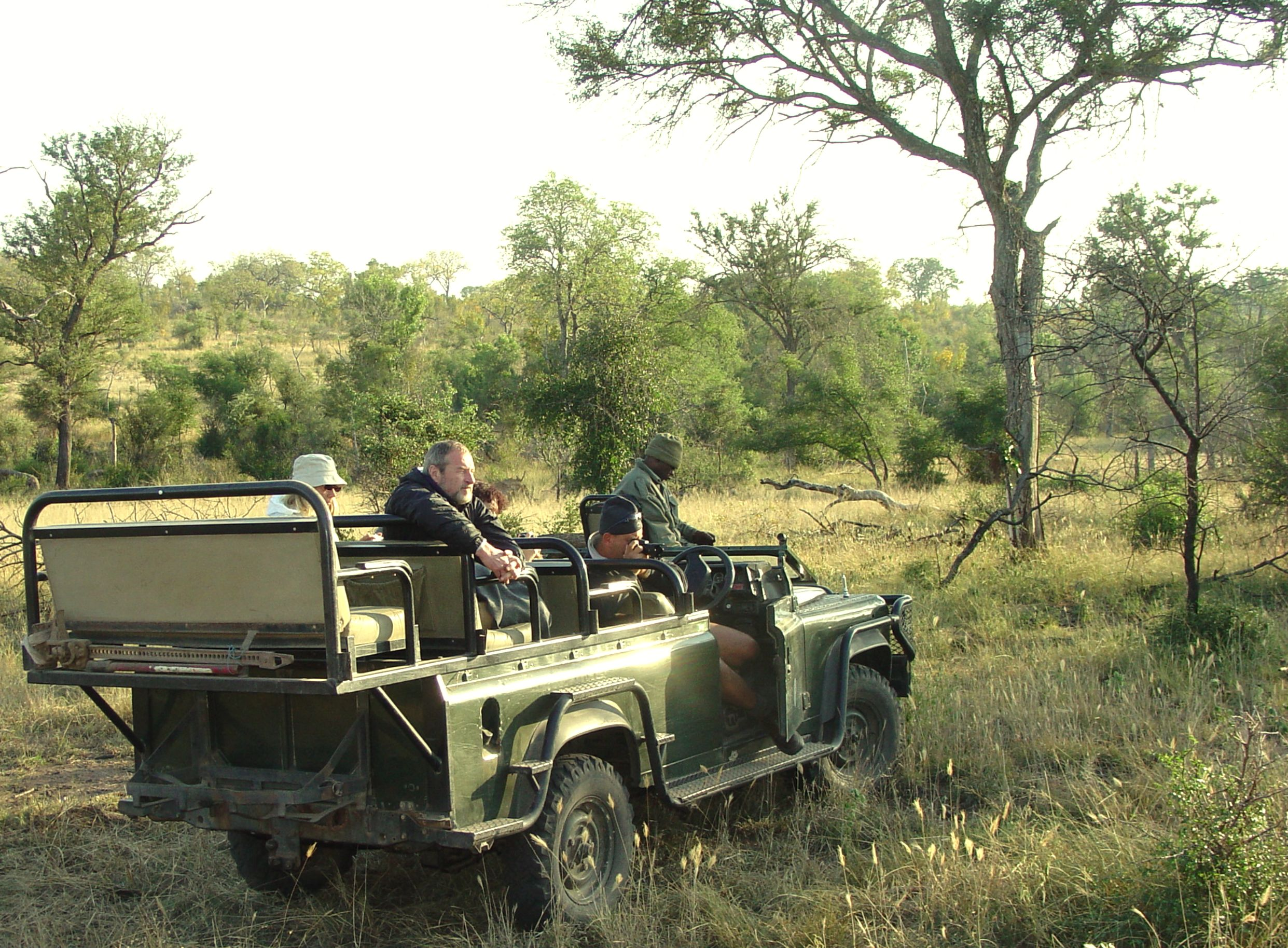
Photographic safari in Sabi Sands Game Reserve, South Africa

A safari (/səˈfɑːri/; from Swahili safari 'journey' originally from Arabic safar 'to journey') is an overland journey to observe or hunt wild animals, especially in East Africa. The so-called "Big Five" game animals of Africa – lion, leopard, rhinoceros, elephant, and Cape buffalo – particularly form an important part of the safari market, both for wildlife viewing and big-game hunting.

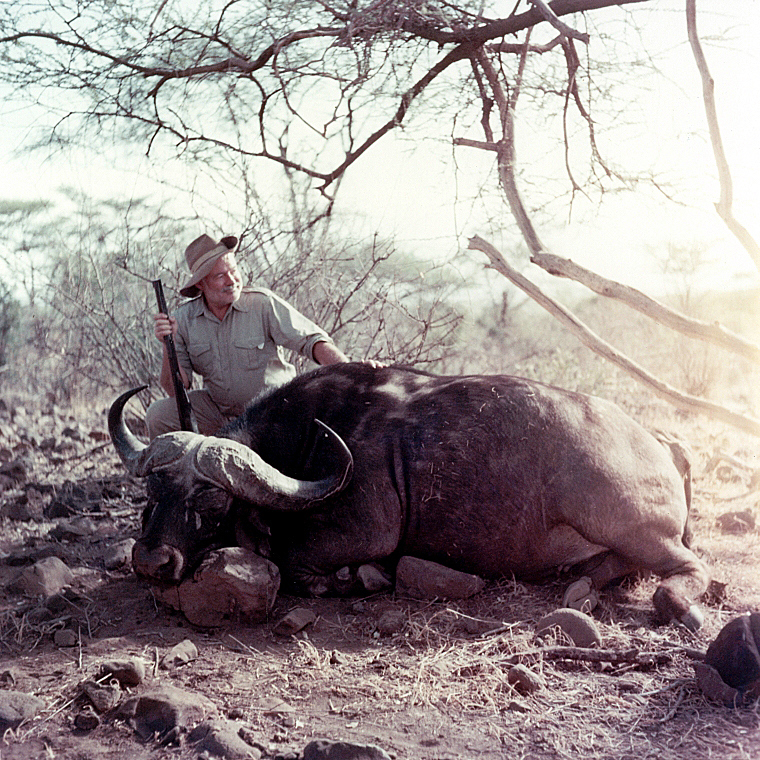
Ernest Hemingway posing with a Cape buffalo he shot on a safari hunt in Africa in the early 1950s

== Etymology ==
The Swahili word safari means "journey", originally from the Arabic noun سفر, safar, meaning "journey", "travel", "trip", or "tour"; the verb for "to travel" in Swahili is kusafiri. These words are used for any type of journey, e.g., by bus from Nairobi to Mombasa or by ferry from Dar es Salaam to Unguja. Safari entered the English language at the end of the 1850s thanks to explorer Richard Francis Burton.

The Regimental March of the King's African Rifles was "Funga Safari", literally 'set out on a journey', or, in other words, pack up equipment ready for travel.

Funga safari, funga safari. Funga safari, funga safari. Amri ya nani? Amri ya nani? Amri ya Bwana Kapteni, Amri ya KAR.

Which is, in English:

Set out on a journey, Set out on a journey. On whose orders? On whose orders? On the order of the boss captain, On the order of the KAR.

On Kenya's independence from the United Kingdom, "Funga Safari" was retained as the Regimental March of the Kenya Rifles, the successor to the KAR.

== History ==
The origins of safari can be traced back to the first arrivals of Europeans and Arabs in Africa, long before the colonization era. Academic and economic interest to Africa increased in Western society in the 19th century when technological advances and medicine (most notably the discovery of quinine as a remedy against malaria) allowed foreigners to safely travel deeper into the continent. These early expeditions established the concept of safari-style travel. While the goal of most visitors was geographical discovery, the search for minerals, and new routes of communication, other visitors were primarily aimed at hunting animals, particularly elephants for their tusks.

In 1836, William Cornwallis Harris led an expedition to observe and record wildlife and landscapes. Harris established the safari style of journey, starting with a not-too-strenuous rising at first light, an energetic day of walking, an afternoon rest, and concluding with a formal dinner and telling stories in the evening over drinks and tobacco.

The firm of Newland & Tarlton Ltd., founded in 1904, pioneered luxury tented safaris.

== Literary genre ==
Jules Verne's first novel Five Weeks in a Balloon published in 1863 and H. Rider Haggard's first novel King Solomon's Mines published in 1885, both describe journeys of English travellers on safari and were best sellers in their day. These two books gave rise to a genre of Safari adventure novels and films.

Ernest Hemingway wrote several fiction and nonfiction pieces about African safaris. His short stories "The Short Happy Life of Francis Macomber" and "The Snows of Kilimanjaro" are set on African safaris and were written after Hemingway's own experience on safari. His books Green Hills of Africa and True at First Light are both set on African safaris.

== Cinematic genre ==
The safari provided countless hours of cinema entertainment in sound films from Trader Horn (1931) onwards. The safari was used in many adventure films such as the Tarzan, Jungle Jim, and Bomba the Jungle Boy film series up to The Naked Prey (1965) where Cornel Wilde, a white hunter, becomes game himself. The safari genre films were parodied in the Bob Hope comedies Road to Zanzibar and Call Me Bwana. A short 15-minute helicopter safari was shown in Africa Addio, where clients are armed, flown from their hotel, and landed in front of an unlucky and baffled elephant. Out of Africa has Karen Blixen and famous hunter Denys Finch Hatton travelling, with Denys refusing to abandon home comforts using fine china and crystal, and listening to Mozart recordings over the gramophone while on safari trip.

== Fashion ==
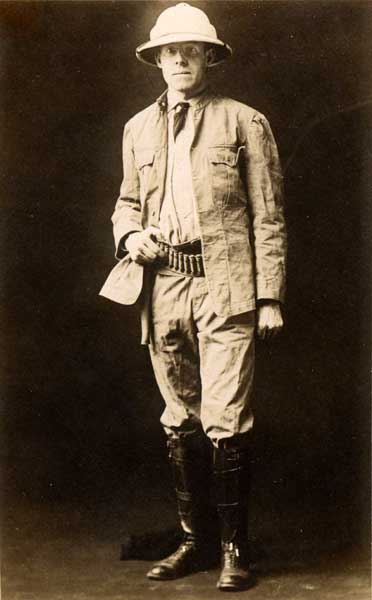
A man in safari gear in the early 1900s

The safari style originated with the jackets worn by British officers during their campaigns in Africa. Khaki clothing is common, particularly with belted bush jackets, pith helmets or slouch hats, and animal skin patterns. The pith helmet was initially worn by the British military in the tropics and was adopted as streetwear between 1870 and 1950. Condé Nast Traveler describes safari jackets as, "crisp drill cotton with pockets, buttons, epaulets, belt", and a part of Kenyan colonial style.

Theodore Roosevelt was "outfitted" in safari-style by his friend Lord Cranworth during his post-presidential safari trip from 1909 to 1910. Lord Cranworth ran Newland & Tarlton, a luxury safari outfitter credited with creating safari-style clothing. Other sources state Roosevelt was outfitted by Willis & Geiger in 1908. Roosevelt carried British style rifles produced by Holland & Holland or Westley Richards, as did other safari attendees such as Ernest Hemingway. Safari-style jackets have been worn by Hemingway as well as Hollywood celebrities like Grace Kelly and Johnny Weissmuller, and they remain a part of contemporary fashion.

In the 2005 spring/summer edition of British Vogue, an article titled "World Vision: the grown-up approach to global style" featured haute safari style clothing. Contemporary American public figures such as Melania Trump have worn safari fashion; in 2018, Mrs. Trump wore a safari-style dress and jackets during her trip to Africa. While in Kenya, Mrs. Trump went on a safari and wore a pith helmet. Some criticized the choice as evoking colonial ideals. In 2014, Harper's Bazaar announced trend alerts featuring animal prints and a "safari sleek" style. Couture designers in their 2015 fashion shows featured variations of safari-style in their collections. Designer Yang Lei featured a silk safari-style evening gown in his Spring/Summer collection during Paris Fashion Week. Alexander Wang's collection focused on a variety of white shirts, including a safari-style white shirt dress. The New York Times described designer Alberta Ferretti's 2015 daywear collection as "safari-sleek".

In John Molloy's history of the leisure suit, he details that safari-style originated from British Officers wearing their uniforms outside military uses as "a status symbol, but only in casual settings." Molloy stated in 1975 that it continues to be a form of casual menswear. Alternatively, in Malindi Kenya, professional wear in the 1990s included safari-style clothing. Yves Saint Laurent's 1967 Africa collection featured the "Saharienne" safari jacket. In later collections, Yves Saint Laurent produced an iconic safari top. According to Harper's Bazaar, the collection was "a fantasy of primitive genius." On the other hand, differing fashion historians believe that he had the gift of borrowing from one culture without being condescending to the other.

The term safari chic arose after the release of the film Out of Africa. It included not only clothing but also interior design and architecture. Safari-style interiors feature African decor, various hues of brown, natural materials, animal print furniture, rugs and wallpaper. In 2005 Architectural Digest released a list of luxurious safari camps. Newland, Tarlton & Co. Furniture Collection, creates luxury safari-style furniture in featured safari camps, hotels and private homes. Safari fashion also extends to fragrance collections by American designer Ralph Lauren; The Safari fragrance created in 1990 was advertised as "a floral aroma with a light breeze scented by grasses, freedom, and the romance of vast open spaces."

== See also ==
- Safari park
- Ecotourism in Africa
- Overlanding
- Horses in Botswana
- Big-game hunting
- Glamping
