= Forgney =

Townland in County Longford, Ireland

Coordinates: 53°32′44″N 7°41′52″W

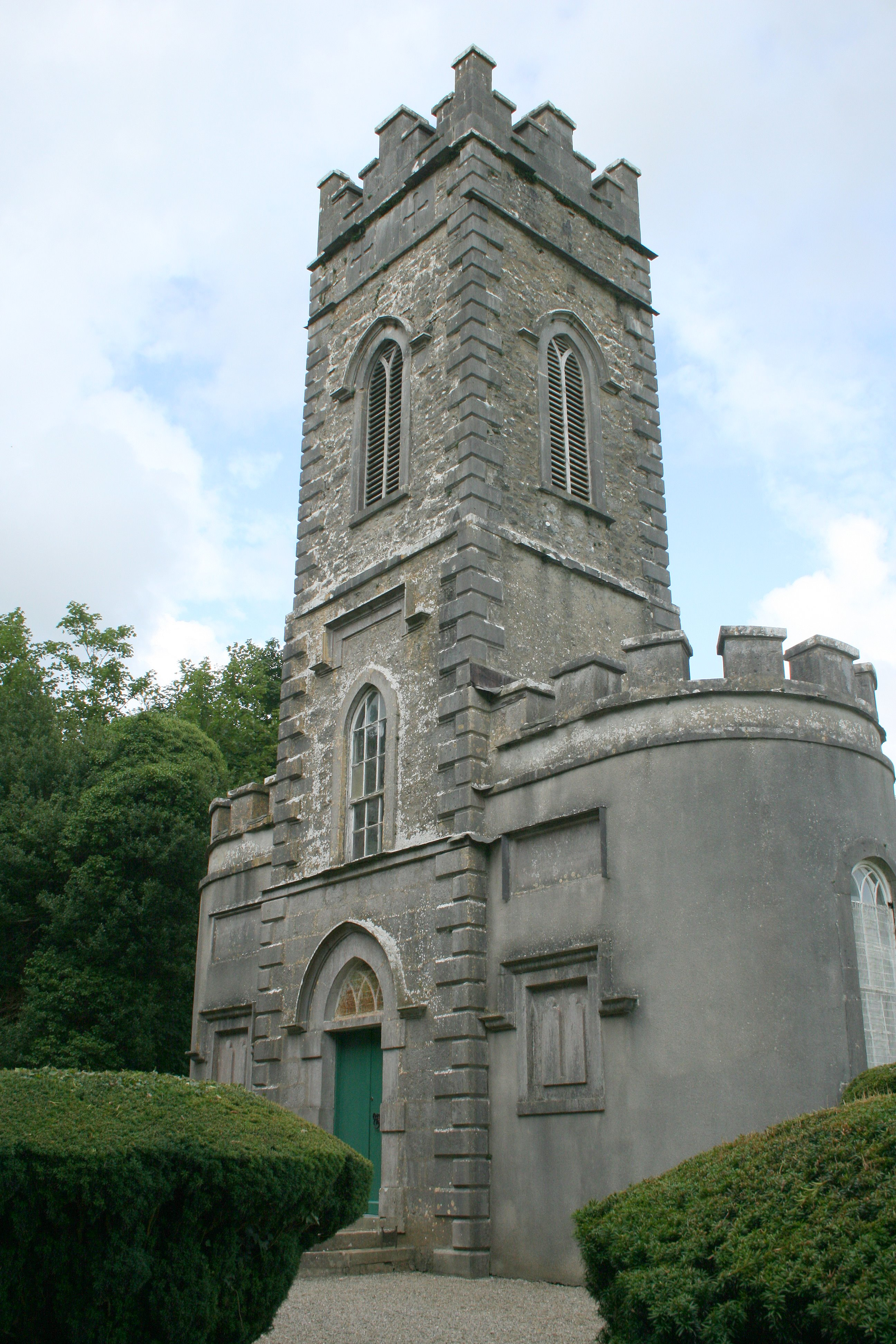
Church of St. Munis

Forgney (Irish: Forgnaí) is a civil parish and townland in County Longford, Ireland. Evidence of ancient settlement in the area include a number of ringfort and holy well sites in Forgney townland. The townland, which has an area of approximately 3.1 square kilometres (1.2 sq mi), had a population of 77 people as of the 2011 census.

Forgney is associated with the poet Oliver Goldsmith, and the local Church of Ireland church, the Church of St. Munis, is where the Rev. Charles Goldsmith, father of the poet, administered from 1718 to 1730. The present church was built in 1810 and replaced that of Goldsmith's day. It is located on the R392 regional road. The church contains a stained glass window with a brass plaque erected in 1897 and inscribed:

To the glory of God and in Memory of Oliver Goldsmith, Poet, Novelist, playwright, born in this parish, of which his father was for twelve years Curate. This window is erected by lovers of the man and his genious [sic].

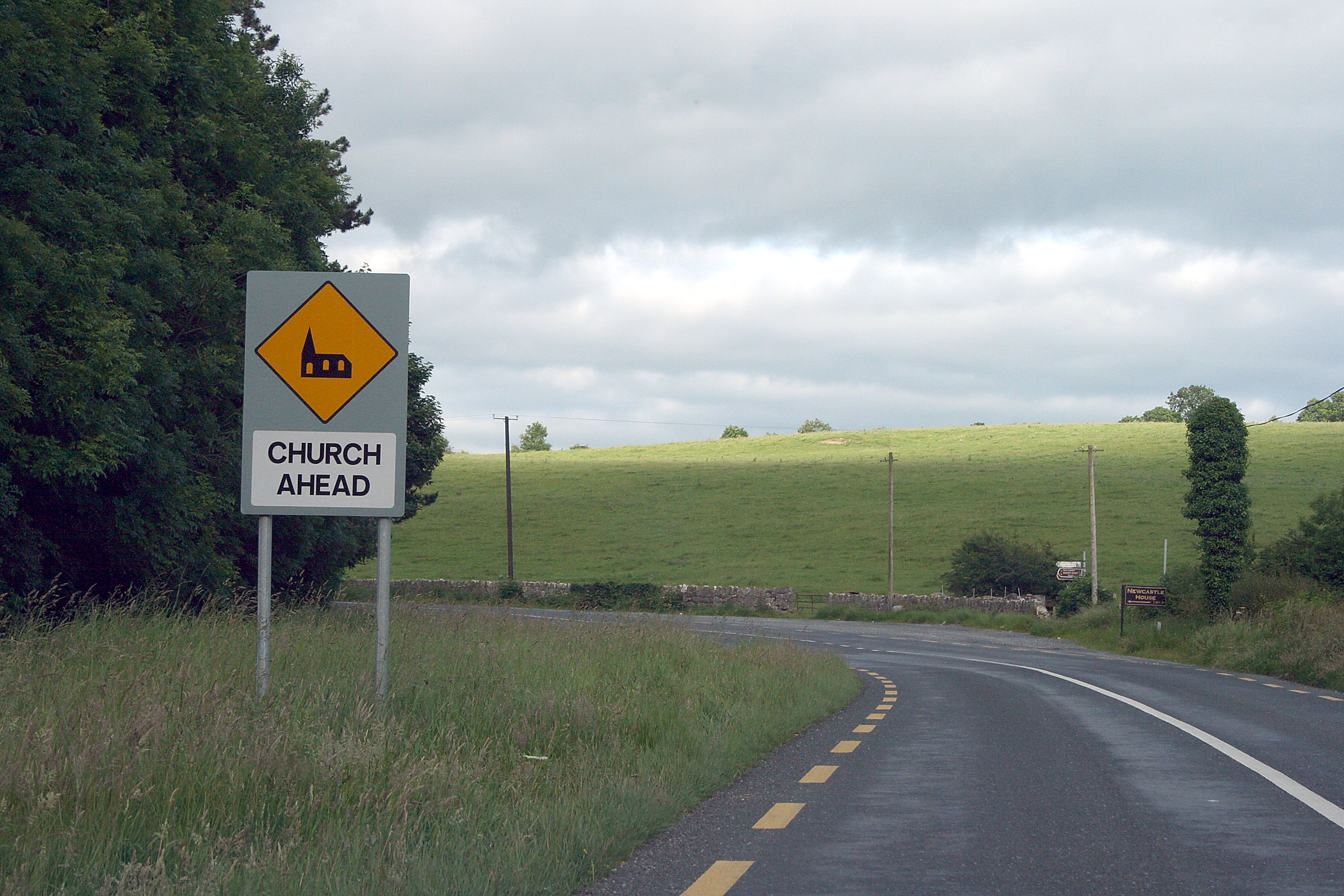
Approaching the church - on the R392 under the Hill of Forgney

The local Roman Catholic church, the Church of the Immaculate Conception, was built c. 1830.

John Henry Patterson was born in Forgney in 1867. He was an Anglo-Irish soldier, hunter, Zionist and author known for his book The Man-eaters of Tsavo (1907), which details his experiences while building a railway bridge over the Tsavo river in Kenya in 1898-99. In the 1996 film The Ghost and the Darkness, he was portrayed by actor Val Kilmer. In the First World War, Patterson was the commander of the Jewish Legion.
