= Fort Ti =

1953 film by William Castle

- Theatrical release poster
- Directed by: William Castle
- Screenplay by: Robert E. Kent
- Story by: Robert E. Kent
- Produced by: Sam Katzman
- Starring: George Montgomery; Joan Vohs
- Cinematography: Lester H. White, Lothrop B. Worth
- Edited by: William A. Lyon
- Color process: Technicolor
- Production company: Columbia Pictures
- Distributed by: Columbia Pictures
- Release date: May 29, 1953
- Running time: 73 minutes
- Country: United States
- Language: English
- Box office: $2.6 million

Fort Ti is a 1953 American 3-D Western film directed by William Castle, and starring George Montgomery and Joan Vohs. Written by Robert E. Kent, the film is the first Western to be released in 3-D and the first 3-D feature to be released in Technicolor by a major studio. Fort Ti was distributed by Columbia Pictures in the United States.

The film is set in 1759 at Fort Ticonderoga during the French and Indian War.

== Premise ==
As war is raging across 18th-century colonial America, a band of famed native fighters joins British forces for an assault on a French stronghold.

== Cast ==
- George Montgomery as Capt. Jedediah Horn
- Joan Vohs as Fortune Mallory
- Irving Bacon as Sgt. Monday Wash
- James Seay as Mark Chesney
- Ben Astar as François Leroy
- Phyllis Fowler as Running Otter
- Howard Petrie as Maj. Robert Rogers
- Cicely Browne as Bess Chesney
- Lester Matthews as Lord Jeffery Amherst
- George Leigh as Capt. Delecroix
- Louis Merrill as Raoul de Moreau
- Rusty Hamer as Jed's nephew (uncredited)

== Production ==
William Castle says Sam Katzman was inspired to make the film by the success of Bwana Devil. Castle says he "decided to throw every goddamn thing I could think of at the camera" in the movie.

3-D supervision was by M.L. Gunzburg, creator of the Natural Vision 3-D system that had initiated the 3-D boom, previously used on Bwana Devil and House of Wax. The film was shot at Columbia Studios and on location in Utah and Southern California.

== Box office ==
Fort Ti earned an estimated $2.6 million domestically during its first year of release.

== Legacy ==
In 1982, Fort Ti became the first 3-D film to be broadcast on television in the United Kingdom on December 5, 1982, on ITV. 3D glasses were given away with the TVTimes listings magazine, which also coincided with the TVS science programme The Real World doing a programme looking at 3-D.

The following year, it became the first 3-D film to be broadcast on television in the United States and Australia along with the Three Stooges 3-D short Pardon My Backfire.
