= Biroc =

Biroc or BIROC may refer to:

- Joseph Biroc (1903–1996), American cinematographer
- British Isles Regional Organising Committee (BIROC) of the Industrial Workers of the World (IWW)
