= Tsavo Man-Eaters =

Pair of dangerous lions in the Tsavo region of Kenya in 1898

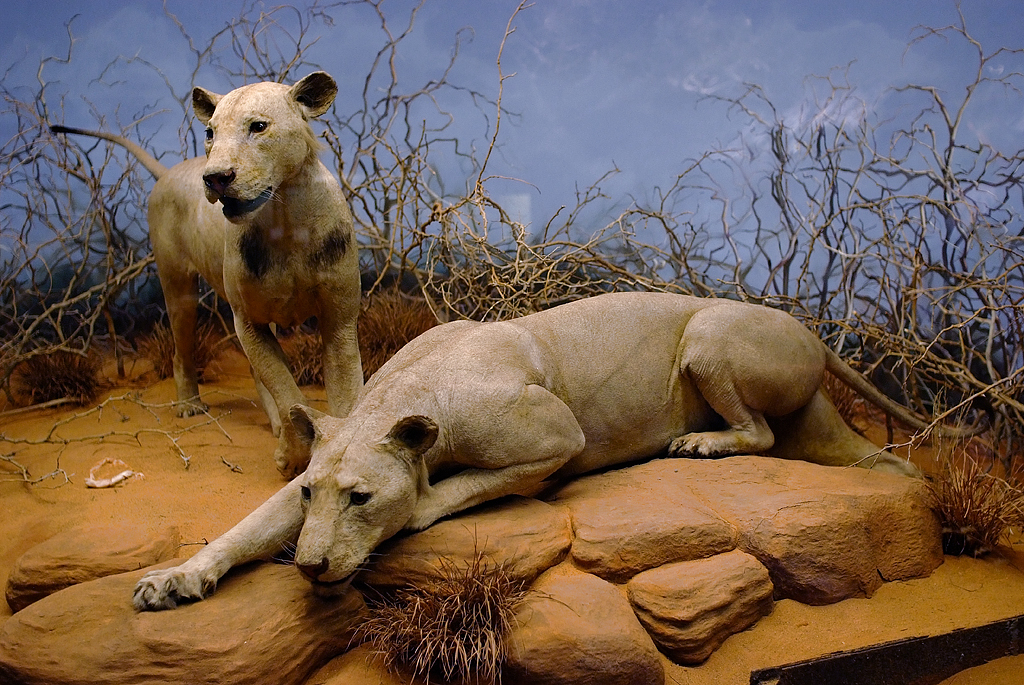
The Tsavo Man-Eaters on display in the Field Museum of Natural History in Chicago, Illinois

The Tsavo Man-Eaters were a pair of large man-eating male lions in the Tsavo region of Kenya, which were responsible for the deaths of many construction workers on the Kenya-Uganda Railway between March and December 1898. The lion pair was said to have killed dozens of people, with some early estimates reaching over a hundred deaths. While the terrors of man-eating lions were not new in the British public perception, the Tsavo Man-Eaters became one of the most notorious instances of dangers posed to Indian and native African workers of the Uganda Railway. They were eventually killed by Lieutenant-Colonel John Henry Patterson, who wrote his account of his hunting experience in a semi-biography The Man-eaters of Tsavo.

Today, the Tsavo Man-Eaters are the most widely studied man-eating pantherine cats given their behavior of hunting humans as a pair and dental injuries reported in one of the lions, a cause commonly attributed to big cats turning to humans as prey.

== Historical information ==
=== Initial killings ===
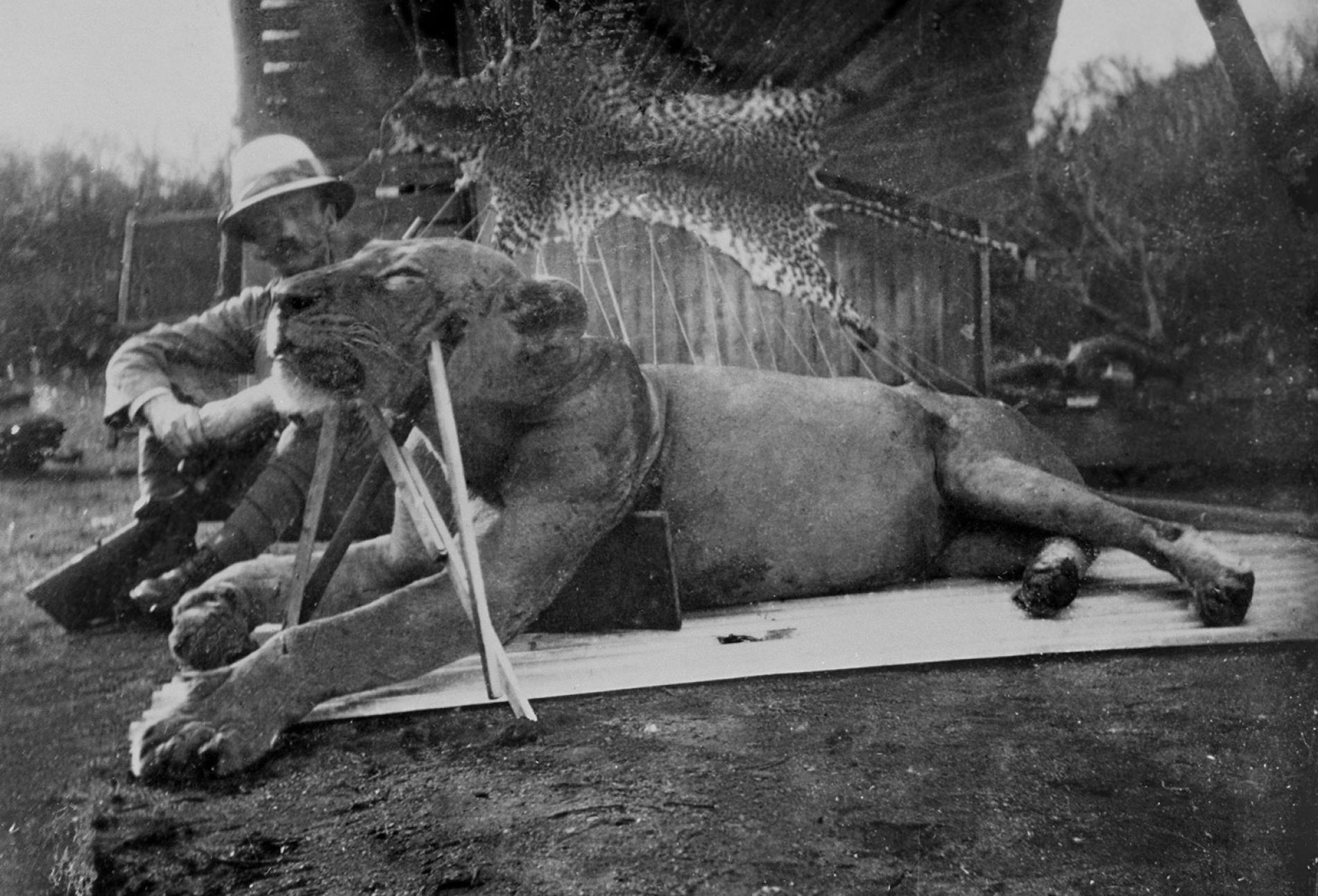
The first lion killed by Patterson, now known as FMNH 23970

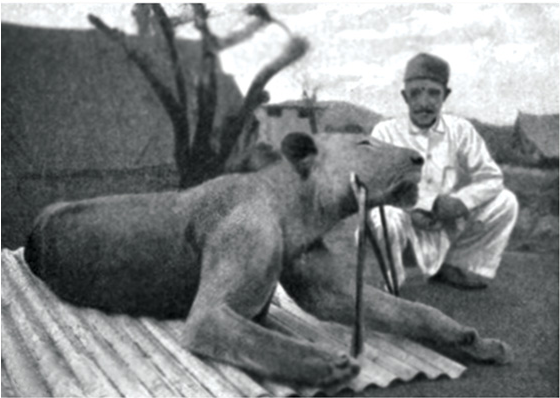
The second lion, FMNH 23969

As part of the construction of a railway linking Uganda with the Indian Ocean at Kilindini Harbour, in March 1898, the British started building a railway bridge over the Tsavo River in Kenya. The building site consisted of several camps spread over an area of 8 miles (13 km), accommodating the several thousand workers from India. The project was led by Lieutenant-Colonel John Henry Patterson, who arrived just days before the disappearances and killings began. During the next nine months of construction, two maneless male Tsavo lions stalked the campsite, dragging workers from their tents at night and devouring them. There was an interval of several months when the attacks ceased, but word trickled in from other nearby settlements of similar lion attacks. When the lions returned, the attacks intensified, with almost daily killings. Crews tried to scare off the lions and built campfires and bomas, or thorn fences made of whistling thorn trees around their camp for protection to keep the man-eaters out, all to no avail; the lions leaped over or crawled through the thorn fences to get into the camps. Patterson noted that early in their killing spree, only one lion at a time would enter the inhabited areas and seize victims, but later, they became more brazen, entering together and each seizing a victim.

As the attacks mounted, hundreds of workers fled from Tsavo, halting construction on the bridge. At this point, colonial officials began to intervene. According to Patterson, even the District Officer, Mr. Whitehead, narrowly escaped being killed by one of the lions after arriving at the Tsavo train depot in the evening. However, his assistant, Abdullah, was killed, while Whitehead escaped with four claw lacerations running down his back.

=== Hunt for the lions ===
Eventually, other officials arrived, with a reinforcement of around twenty armed sepoys to assist in the hunt.Patterson set traps and tried several times to ambush the lions at night from a tree. After repeated unsuccessful attempts, he shot the first lion on 9 December 1898. Twenty days later, the second lion was found and killed. The first lion killed measured 9 ft 8 in (2.95 m) from nose to tip of the tail. It took eight men to carry the carcass back to camp.

Patterson wrote in his account that he wounded the first lion with one bullet from a high-caliber rifle. This shot struck the lion in its hind leg, but it escaped. Later, it returned at night and began stalking Patterson as he tried to hunt it. He shot it through the shoulder, penetrating its heart with a more powerful rifle, and found it lying dead the next morning not far from his platform.

The second lion was shot nine times, five with the same rifle, three with a second, and once with a third rifle – six finding their mark. The first shot was fired from atop a scaffolding that Patterson had built near a goat killed by the lion. Two shots from a second rifle hit the lion eleven days later as it was stalking Patterson and trying to flee. When they found the lion the next day, Patterson shot it three more times with the same rifle, severely crippling it, and shot it three times with a third rifle, twice in the chest and once in the head, which killed it. He claimed it died gnawing on a fallen tree branch, still trying to reach him.

=== Resumption of works ===
The construction crew returned and finished the bridge in February 1899. The exact number of people killed by the lions is unclear. Patterson gave several figures, overall claiming that there were 135 victims. At the end of the crisis, the prime minister of the United Kingdom, Lord Salisbury, addressed the House of Lords on the subject of the Tsavo man-eaters:

"The whole of the works were put to a stop because a pair of man-eating lions appeared in the locality and conceived a most unfortunate taste for our workmen. At last the labourers entirely declined to carry on unless they were guarded by iron entrenchments. Of course it is difficult to work a railway under these conditions and until we found an enthusiastic sportsman to get rid of these lions our enterprise was seriously hindered."

== Museum display ==
After 25 years as Patterson's floor rugs, the lions' skins were sold to the Field Museum of Natural History in 1924 for $5,000. The skins arrived at the museum in very poor condition. The lions were reconstructed and are now on permanent display, along with their skulls.

== Modern research ==
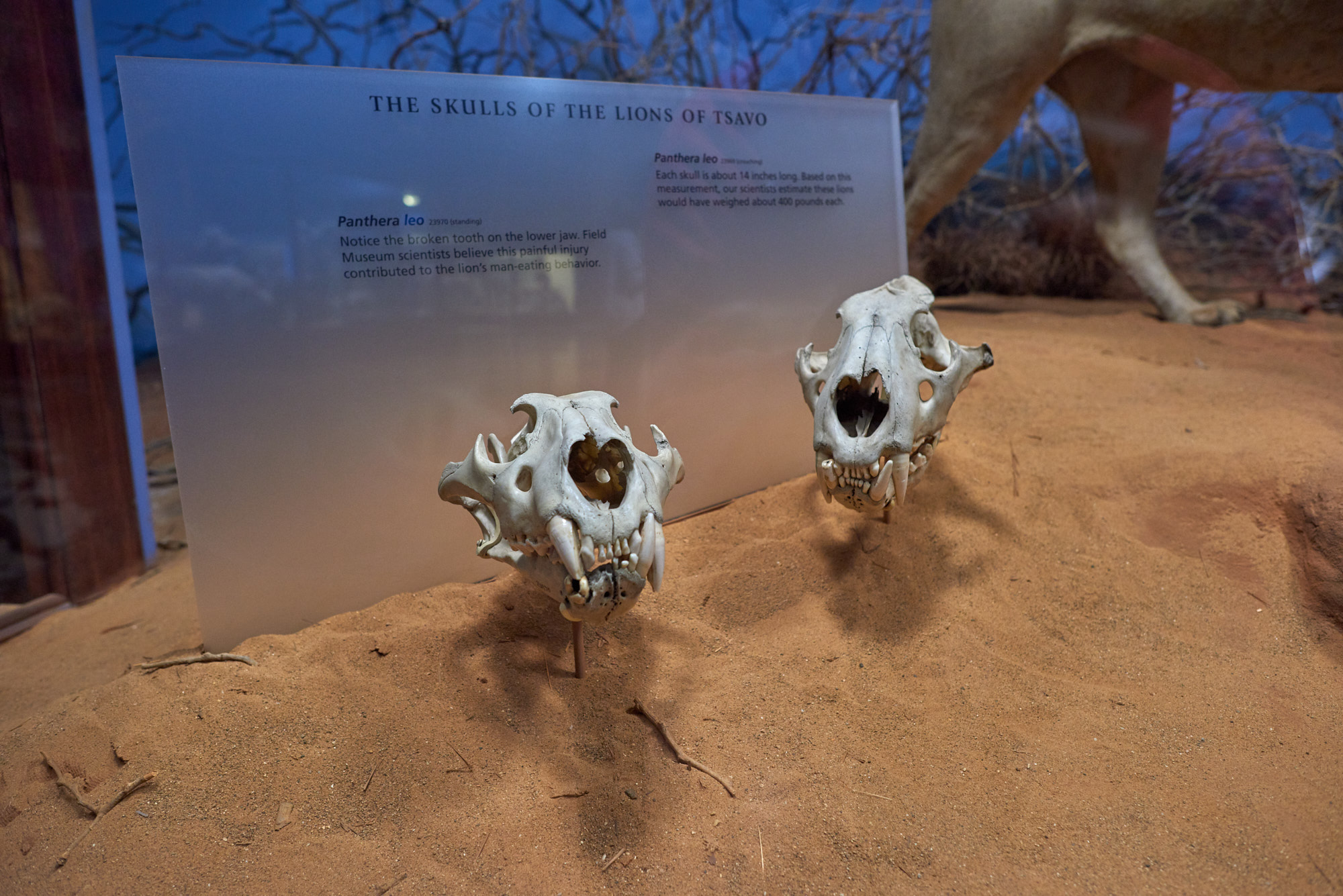
Tsavo Lion skulls on display at the Field Museum in Chicago

In 2001, a review of causes for man-eating behaviour among lions revealed that the proposed human toll of 100 or more was most likely an exaggeration and that the more likely death toll was 28–31 victims. This reduced total was based on their review of Colonel Patterson's original journal, courtesy of Alan Patterson. However, the same study also noted that the journal refers only to Indian workers and that Patterson stated that the casualties were much higher in the African worker population but that those numbers were not documented.

The two lion specimens in Chicago's Field Museum are known as FMNH 23970, the 'standing' mount, killed on 9 December 1898, and FMNH 23969, the 'crouching' mount, killed on 29 December 1898. Recent studies on the isotopic signature analysis of Δ13C and Nitrogen-15 in their bone collagen and hair keratin were published in 2009. Using realistic assumptions on the consumable tissue per victim, lion energetic needs, and their assimilation efficiencies, researchers compared the man-eaters' Δ13C signatures to various reference standards: Tsavo lions with normal (wildlife) diets, grazers, and browsers from Tsavo East and Tsavo West, and the skeletal remains of Taita people from the early 20th century. Interpolation of their estimates across the nine months of recorded man-eating behavior suggested that FMNH 23969 most likely ate the equivalent of 10.5 humans and that FMNH 23970 most likely ate 24.2 humans. However, the researchers noted that, according to their estimates, a combined death toll as high as 72 was still possible.

DNA from compacted hair found in the tooth cavities of the Tsavo man-eaters in 2024 reveals that in addition to humans, the lions fed on zebras, oryx, waterbuck, wildebeest, and at least two individuals of Masai giraffe. This suggests the lions would switch between hunting their natural prey and humans, though it remains unclear as to whether the lions began hunting humans as a result of the injuries sustained to the male with the damaged tooth.

The DNA analysis also confirmed that the lions were brothers. Each had the other's hair in his tooth cavities, suggesting that they were closely bonded and groomed each other.

The scientific analysis does not differentiate between the entire human corpses consumed and the parts of individual prey since the attacks often raise alarms, forcing the lions to slink back into the surrounding area. Many workers over the long construction period went missing, died in accidents, or fled out of fear, so it is likely almost all of the builders who stayed on knew someone missing or supposedly eaten. It appears that Colonel Patterson may have exaggerated his claims, as have subsequent investigators (e.g., "135 armed men", Neiburger and Patterson, 2000), though none of these modern studies have taken into account the people who were killed but not eaten by the animals. Other researchers have also shown that estimates of animal diets derived from isotopic models often deviate considerably from the correct values.

== Possible causes of "man-eating" behavior ==
Multiple theories for the man-eating behavior of the lions have been proposed:

An outbreak of rinderpest (cattle plague) in 1898 (see 1890s African rinderpest epizootic) devastated the lions' usual prey, forcing them to find alternative food sources.

The Tsavo lions may have been accustomed to finding dead humans at the Tsavo River crossing. Slave caravans to the center of the East African slave trade, Zanzibar, routinely crossed the river there.

One of the Tsavo lions showed evidence of dental disease, including a broken canine tooth with a periapical abscess. Additionally, this lion was shown to have consumed the majority of the lions’ victims. Bruce D. Patterson, one of the lead researchers on the Tsavo lions, posits that this dental damage made it more difficult for the lion to attack its natural prey, leading it to begin preying on humans. This theory is further supported by dental microphotographs of the lions’ teeth, showing wear patterns more consistent with eating soft foods than with bone-crushing. This suggests that the lions were not consuming humans as an act of last resort, but rather supplementing their regular diets with human prey. While the second Tsavo lion did not have as extensive dental issues, it is possible that he may have learned to feed on humans through his bond with the first lion. Colonel Patterson, who killed the lions, disclaimed this theory, saying that he damaged that tooth with his rifle while the lion charged him one night, prompting it to flee.

== Popular culture ==
=== In film ===
Patterson's book was the basis for several films:

- Men Against the Sun (1952) – shot on location in Kenya
- Bwana Devil (1952)
- The Ghost and the Darkness (1996), with Val Kilmer playing John Henry Patterson
- Mrugaraju

== See also ==
- History of Kenya
- Mfuwe man-eating lion
- The Man-eaters of Tsavo (the book)
- W. D. M. Bell

== Sources ==
- The Man-Eaters of Tsavo at Wikisource
