= Tennessee Johnson =

1942 film by William Dieterle

- Directed by: William Dieterle
- Screenplay by: John L. Balderston; Wells Root
- Story by: Milton Gunzburg; Alvin Meyers
- Produced by: J. Walter Ruben; Irving Asher (uncredited)
- Starring: Van Heflin; Lionel Barrymore; Ruth Hussey
- Cinematography: Harold Rosson
- Edited by: Robert Kern
- Music by: Herbert Stothart
- Distributed by: Metro-Goldwyn-Mayer
- Release date: December 3, 1942
- Running time: 103 minutes
- Country: United States
- Language: English
- Budget: $1,042,000
- Box office: $684,000

Tennessee Johnson is a 1942 American biographical film about Andrew Johnson, the 17th president of the United States, released by Metro-Goldwyn-Mayer and directed by William Dieterle. The screenplay was written by John L. Balderston and Wells Root, from a story by Milton Gunzburg and Alvin Meyers.

It stars Van Heflin as Johnson, Lionel Barrymore as his nemesis Thaddeus Stevens, and Ruth Hussey as first lady Eliza McCardle Johnson. The film depicts the events surrounding Johnson's impeachment, and "presents its title character as Lincoln’s worthy successor who runs afoul of vindictive Radical Republicans."

Like most U.S. historical films made during World War II, Tennessee Johnson has a strong underlying theme of national unity. The film depicts Johnson as a visionary who heals the rift between North and South despite the efforts of his shortsighted foes. In a climactic but fictional scene, he delivers an impassioned speech to the senators sitting in judgment of him, and warns them that failure to readmit the former Confederate states will leave America defenseless before its overseas foes. In fact, Johnson never appeared in person at his impeachment trial.

== Plot ==
Runaway tailor's apprentice Andrew Johnson wanders into the Tennessee town of Greeneville. He is persuaded to settle there. He barters his services to the librarian, Eliza McCardle, in return for her teaching him to read and write, and eventually marries her.

Stung by the injustice of the monopoly of power by the landowners and with the encouragement of his wife, Johnson starts organizing political meetings. One is broken up by the powers that be; in the resulting fighting, one of Johnson's friends is killed. He dissuades the others from resorting to violence. Instead, he is talked into running for sheriff and is elected. By 1860, the eve of the American Civil War, he has risen to the United States Senate.

When war breaks out, Johnson breaks with his state and stays loyal to the Union. As a general, he becomes a hero defending Nashville against a siege. Abraham Lincoln chooses him for his vice president in part because they share similar views on reconciling with the South after the war is won, unlike powerful, vengeful Congressman Thaddeus Stevens. When Lincoln is assassinated, Johnson succeeds to the presidency.

After he refuses to accept a deal offered by Stevens, the latter starts impeachment proceedings against the president, with himself as chief prosecutor. Johnson stays away from the trial on the advice of men who fear he would lose his temper. With his cabinet members denied the right to testify, however, Johnson appears at the very end and makes a stirring speech. The vote is close, with 35 judging him guilty and 18 not, but Senator Huyler is unconscious and unable to vote. Stevens, who is counting on him, delays the final verdict until Huyler can be roused and brought in for the deciding vote. To his dismay, Huyler votes not guilty. The film ends with Johnson, his term as president over, triumphantly returning to the Senate.

== Cast ==
- Van Heflin as Andrew Johnson
- Lionel Barrymore as Thaddeus Stevens
- Ruth Hussey as Eliza McCardle Johnson
- Marjorie Main as Maude Fisher
- Regis Toomey as Blackstone McDannell
- J. Edward Bromberg as Coke
- Grant Withers as Mordecai Milligan, the murdered blacksmith
- Alec Craig as Sam Andrews
- Charles Dingle as Senator Jim Waters
- Carl Benton Reid as Congressman Hargrove
- Russell Hicks as Lincoln's emissary
- Noah Beery as Sheriff Cass
- Robert Warwick as Major Crooks
- Montagu Love as Chief Justice Chase (based on the real Chief Justice, Salmon P. Chase)
- Lloyd Corrigan as Mr. Secretary (based on Edwin Stanton, Lincoln's Secretary of War, fired by Johnson)
- William Farnum as Senator Huyler (based upon Senator Edmund G. Ross of Kansas)
- Charles Trowbridge as Lansbury
- Russell Simpson as Kirby
- Morris Ankrum as Senator Jefferson Davis
- Mark Daniels as John Hay (uncredited)
- William B. Davidson as Vice President Breckinridge (uncredited)
- Harrison Greene as General Grant (uncredited)
- Roger Imhof as Hannibal Hamlin (uncredited)
- Lloyd Ingraham as Vice President at End (uncredited)
- Alberto Morin as Clemenceau (uncredited)
- James Warren as James Patterson (uncredited)

== Controversy and inaccuracy ==
Critics complained that the film soft-pedaled Andrew Johnson's prejudice toward black people. Actor and comedian Zero Mostel, who was then just becoming a well-known name in show business, took part in protests against the movie.

According to paleoconservative writer Bill Kauffman, Tennessee Johnson is notable for the campaign of repression waged against it. Vincent Price, Mostel and Ben Hecht, among others, petitioned the Office of War Information to destroy the film in the interest of national unity. Kauffman surmised that Manny Farber had written the most intelligent opinion on the matter in The New Republic in which he said: "Censorship is a disgrace, whether done by the Hays office and pressure groups, or by liberals and the OWI."

The film was protested by the NAACP as well as the Communist Party USA.

Although the film portrays Johnson delivering a speech at his impeachment trial, in actuality, Johnson did not appear at the trial on the advice of his legal counsel.

== Reception ==
According to MGM records, the film made $570,000 in the U.S. and Canada, and $114,000 in other markets, resulting in a loss of $637,000.

== See also ==
- List of films and television shows about the American Civil War
