= Rusty Hamer =

American actor (1947–1990)

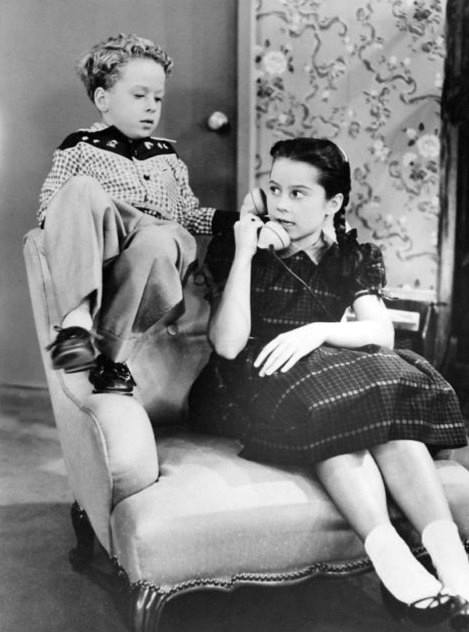
- Hamer and Sherry Jackson in Make Room for Daddy in 1955
- Born: Russell Craig Hamer; February 15, 1947; Tenafly, New Jersey, U.S.
- Died: January 18, 1990 (aged 42); DeRidder, Louisiana, U.S.
- Education: Palisades High School
- Occupation: Actor
- Years active: 1953–1971

Russell Craig "Rusty" Hamer (February 15, 1947 – January 18, 1990) was an American stage, film, and television actor. He portrayed Rusty Williams, the wisecracking son of entertainer Danny Williams (Danny Thomas), on the ABC/CBS situation comedy Make Room for Daddy (later retitled The Danny Thomas Show), from 1953 to 1964. He reprised the role in three reunion specials and the sequel series, Make Room for Granddaddy, which aired on ABC from 1970 to 1971.

== Early life ==
Born in Tenafly, New Jersey, Hamer was the youngest of three sons of Arthur Walter John Hamer Sr., a men's shirt salesman and Dorothy Hamer (née Chretien), a former silent film actress of Maltese heritage. He had two older brothers, John and Walter. As a child, Hamer was nicknamed "Rusty" as a derivative of his first name Russell, and also because of his red hair and freckles.

== Career ==
Due to his parents' involvement in community theater productions, Hamer and his brothers performed in stage productions. As a toddler, Hamer memorized and recited stories and performed skits for service club luncheons, women's clubs, and church groups.

In 1951, the Hamers moved to Los Angeles, where Arthur Hamer worked as representative for a manufacturer of men's sport shirts. Arthur Hamer died eight months after his son was cast in The Danny Thomas Show.

Shortly after arriving in Los Angeles, Hamer's older brother John was discovered by an agent while performing in a local stage production in which Rusty was also performing. The agent signed both boys to a film contract. The following year, Hamer won his first acting role in the 3-D Western Fort Ti, starring George Montgomery and Joan Vohs.

In 1953, entertainer Danny Thomas's secretary saw Hamer in a stage production and was impressed by the child's talent and charm. She suggested that Thomas audition Hamer for a role in his upcoming sitcom Make Room for Daddy. Thomas was also impressed by the 6-year old and cast Hamer as his precocious and quick-witted son, Rusty Williams. Thomas later said of Hamer, "He was the best boy actor I ever saw in my life. He had a great memory...great timing and you could change a line on him at the last minute and he came right back with it."

Make Room for Daddy debuted on ABC on September 29, 1953, and, while critically acclaimed, garnered poor ratings. After four seasons, the series moved to CBS where it was re-tooled and retitled The Danny Thomas Show. The retooled version quickly became a hit with audiences and was a Top 15 hit for its remaining seven seasons.

During the run of The Danny Thomas Show, Hamer attempted to launch a singing career. He first performed a song in a 1956 episode of Danny Thomas entitled "The Talented Kid". In 1959, Hamer released his only single, a "rockaballad" called "Two-of-a-Kind" (with the b side "If Only Mother Would Let Me") written by Wally Gold and Aaron Schroeder, through Mercury Records. The single was a commercial failure and Hamer never released another single.

By late 1963, The Danny Thomas Show had garnered five Primetime Emmy Awards (among other awards) and was still ranked in the Top 10. However, Danny Thomas announced that he had decided to end the show in order to produce and star in other projects.

After the series ended, 17-year-old Hamer enrolled at Palisades High School (later restructured as Palisades Charter High School), but had difficulty adjusting to public school as he was accustomed to being privately tutored on the set.

Shortly before graduating in June 1964, Hamer was interviewed by reporter Bob Thomas and stated that he intended to continue his acting career and hoped to branch out into dramatic roles. Hamer said that he was under consideration for roles in several television series including Mr. Novak, Arrest and Trial, and Ben Casey. Hamer also said that he planned to attend college on the advice of Danny Thomas, whom he considered a second father, since his own father had died in 1953.

About a year after The Danny Thomas Show ended, Hamer reprised the role of Rusty Williams in three episodes of The Joey Bishop Show, in which Rusty was a university student staying with the family of Joey Barnes. The show was coincidentally cancelled shortly after Hamer's arrival. Hamer also appeared in the reunion special The Danny Thomas TV Family Reunion, which aired on NBC.

On December 27, 1966, Hamer underwent emergency surgery at Santa Monica Emergency Hospital after sustaining a gunshot wound to the abdomen when a gun he was carrying in a shoulder holster slid out, fell to the ground, and discharged. Hamer was carrying the gun having just returned from an overnight hunting trip. After recovering, he appeared in a second reunion special, "Make More Room For Daddy", that aired during a segment of the NBC anthology series The Danny Thomas Hour, in 1967.

Throughout the mid to late 1960s, Hamer continued to attempt a transition into adult roles and, according to Danny Thomas, enrolled in acting classes, but was unable to land any acting jobs. By the end of the decade, he had grown increasingly bitter and depressed over his waning career. To support himself, he began working for a messenger service in Los Angeles and later worked as a carpenter's apprentice. Hamer's only non-"Rusty Williams" acting role post-1964 was a guest spot on the CBS sitcom Green Acres that aired in November 1969.

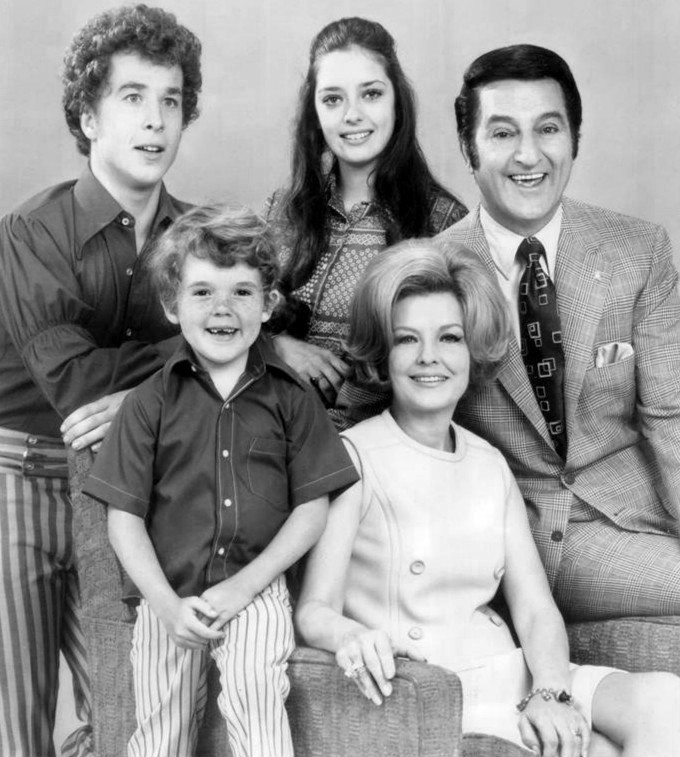
Hamer (top left) in 1970 with co-stars in Make Room for Granddaddy.

In 1969, Hamer again reprised his role as Rusty Williams in a third reunion special, Make Room for Granddaddy. The special aired on CBS on September 14. Due to the ratings success of the reunion specials, ABC created a weekly sequel series, also titled Make Room for Granddaddy, for their fall 1970 schedule. The series premiered on September 24, 1970, but failed to catch on with audiences. Make Room for Granddaddy was cancelled after one season. It was Hamer's final acting role.

== Later years ==
In the 1970s, Hamer moved to southwestern Louisiana where he worked on an off-shore oil rig for Exxon and delivered newspapers. In 1976, he relocated to DeRidder, Louisiana, to be closer to his ailing mother, Dorothy, who was suffering from Alzheimer's disease and lived with his older brother John. John had opened a cafe where, in his final years, Rusty Hamer occasionally worked as a short order cook.

In October 1981, Hamer reunited with former co-stars Danny Thomas and Angela Cartwright. The reunion was televised as part of the ABC special What Became Of...?, that aired on October 25.

== Death ==
On the night of January 18, 1990, John Hamer found his brother's body in his trailer home in DeRidder, Louisiana. Hamer had shot himself in the head with a .357 Magnum revolver.

John Hamer later said he believed that his brother had remained bitter over his inability to transition into acting as an adult. He also said he believed that his brother's chronic and debilitating back pain (for which Hamer refused to seek medical treatment) and their mother's illness had contributed to Hamer's depression. He stated:

He hasn't really been happy since his early 20s. But he didn't show any signs of this happening. It was just all of a sudden. [...] He was a very unhappy, very confused young man. No one does something like that if he isn't confused. I've heard of a lot of child actors who have become unhappy with their lives after they've left the industry.

Hamer's body was cremated and no service was held. His ashes were scattered at sea, three miles off Marina del Rey, California, with the ashes of Tommy Rettig in a combined ceremony after the latter's death in 1996.

== Legacy ==
On February 8, 1960, Hamer was awarded a star on the Hollywood Walk of Fame for his work in television. His star is located at 6323 Hollywood Boulevard.

Hamer's suicide raised awareness of the potential mental fragility of child performers and inspired fellow former child actor Paul Petersen, formerly of ABC's The Donna Reed Show, to establish the support group A Minor Consideration. The group seeks to improve working conditions for young actors and assists former child entertainers in making the transition from past fame to adult life.

== Filmography ==
Year	Title	Role	Notes
1953	Fort Ti	Jed's Nephew	Uncredited
1953–1964	Make Room for Daddy	Rusty Williams	323 episodes
1954	Four Star Playhouse	Dickie	Episode: "Vote of Confidence"
1954	Shower of Stars	Rusty	Episode: "Entertainment on Wheels"
1956	Dance with Me, Henry	Duffer	Final 'Abbott & Costello' film
1958	The Lucy-Desi Comedy Hour	Rusty Williams	Episode: "Lucy Makes Room for Danny"
1958	Westinghouse Desilu Playhouse	Rusty Williams	Episode: "Lucy Makes Room for Danny"
1958	The Ford Show, Starring Tennessee Ernie Ford	Himself	Episode #3.13
1961	The Red Skelton Show	Guest drummer	Episode #10.12
1965	The Joey Bishop Show	Rusty Williams	3 episodes
1967	The Danny Thomas Hour	Rusty	Episode: "Make More Room for Daddy"
1969	Green Acres	Alfred	Episode: "Oliver's Schoolgirl Crush"
1970–1971	Make Room for Granddaddy	Rusty Williams	24 episodes, (final appearance)
