= Mfuwe man-eating lion =

Man-eating lion

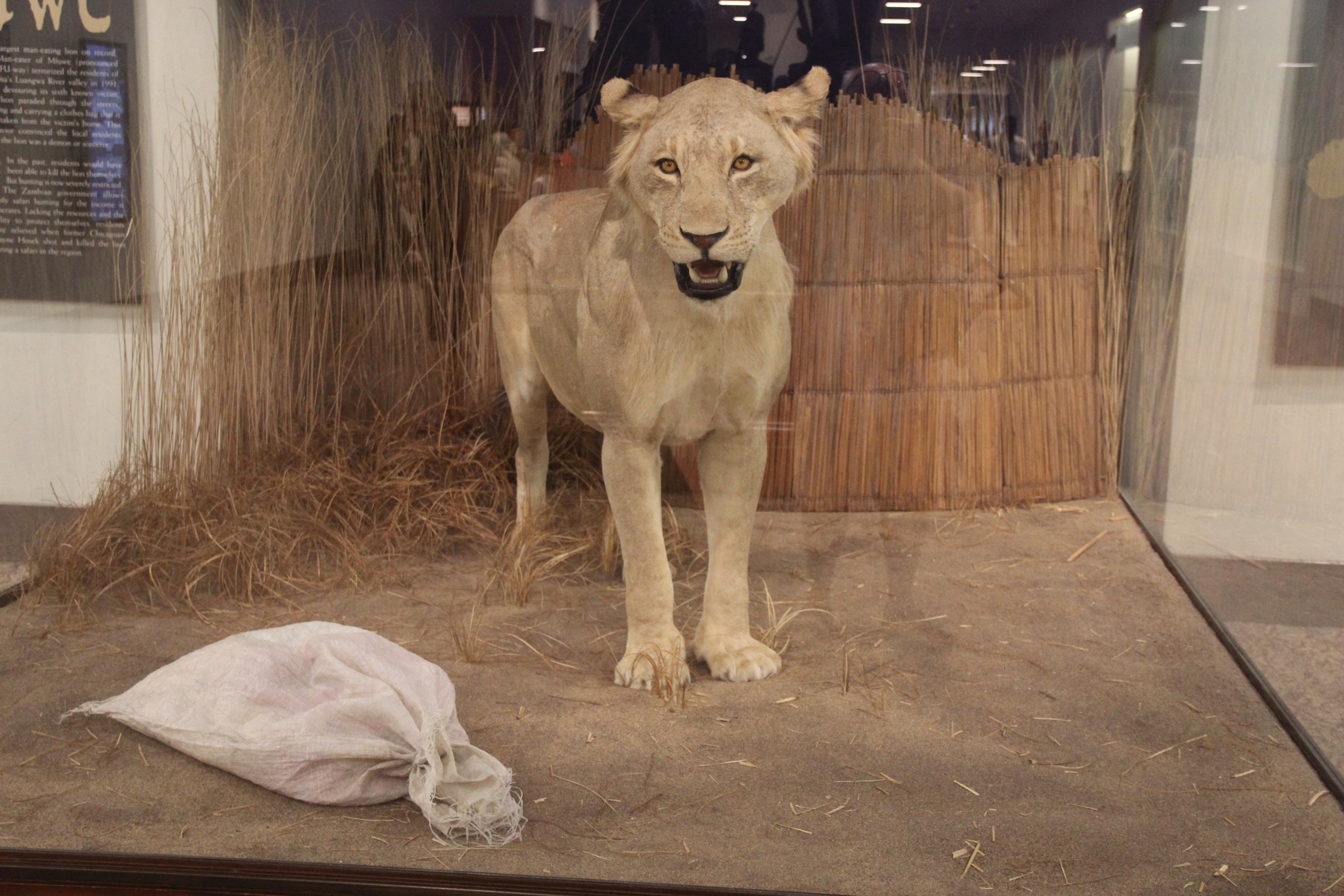
- The Man-eater of Mfuwe on display at the Field Museum
- Other names: The Man-Eater of Mfuwe; Lion of Mfuwe
- Species: Lion
- Died: 1991; Luangwa River valley
- Cause of death: Bullet wounds
- Known for: Killing and consuming six people

The Man-eater of Mfuwe was a sizeable male Southern African lion (Panthera leo melanochaita) responsible for the deaths of six people. Measuring 3.2 metres (10 ft) long and standing at 1.2 metres (3.9 ft) tall at the shoulders, with a weight of 249 kilograms (500 lbs), it is the largest man-eating lion on record.

== Attacks ==
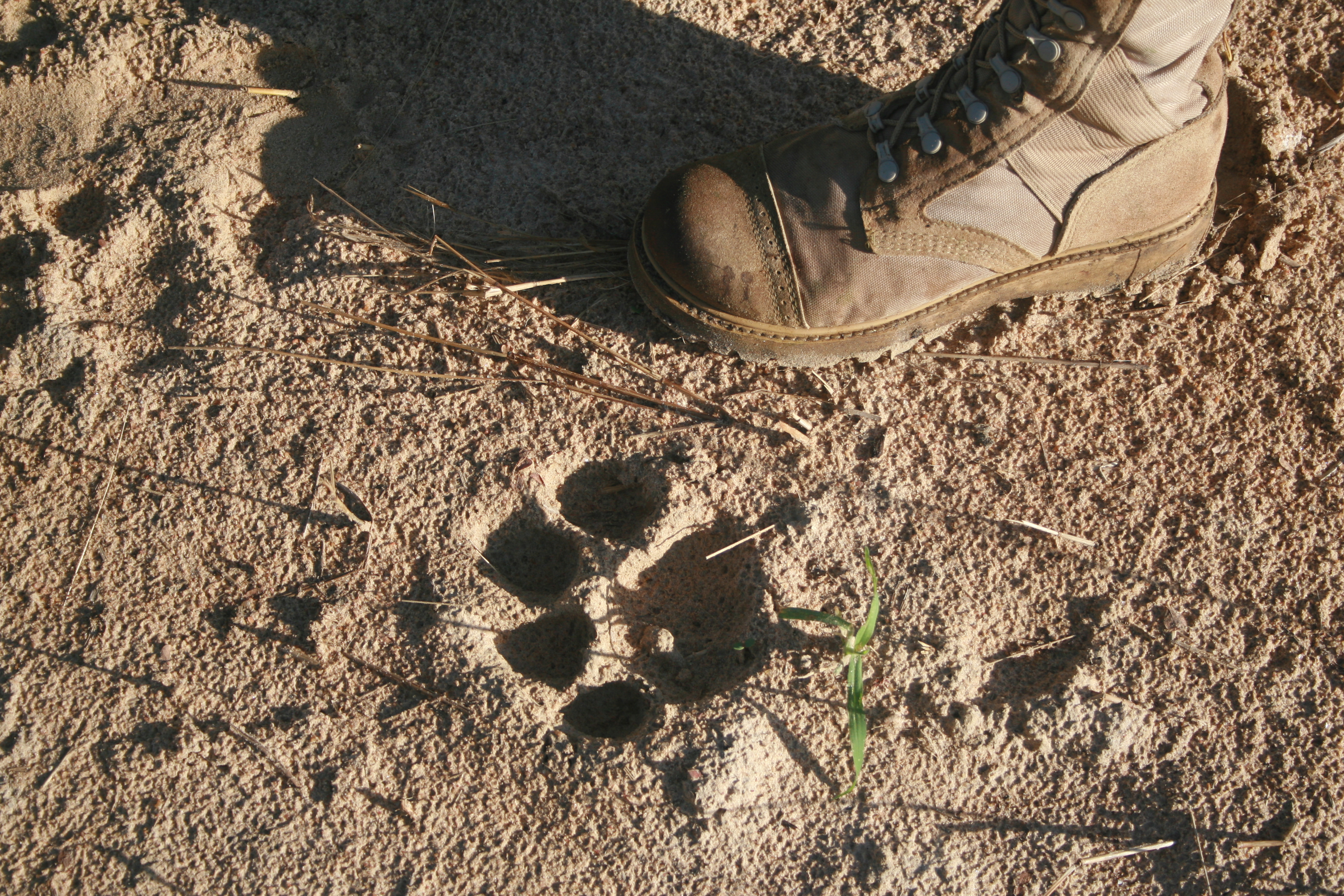
The paw print of a lion, photographed in the Luangwa Valley.

The Man-eater of Mfuwe was active within the Luangwa Valley in Zambia, an area which is home to the country's largest population of lions.

=== August 1991 ===
The first attack took place whilst two local boys were travelling along a road at night. While one of the boys was able to flee to safety, the second was mauled to death, with only scant pieces of his clothing and fragments of his skull left behind. The second incident involved an adult woman, whom the lion attacked after breaking into her home situated at the edge of a village.

The third incident occurred once again at night when a young boy, travelling alone to meet a friend, was set upon by the lion. The attack was interrupted by a game ranger who managed to scare the lion off by firing his gun into the air, though the boy later succumbed to his injuries.

Likely due to the lack of a prominent mane, it was initially believed that the lion was a female, with the lionesses of "L-pride" being blamed for the killings. One lioness was killed initially in hopes of ending the spree of attacks.

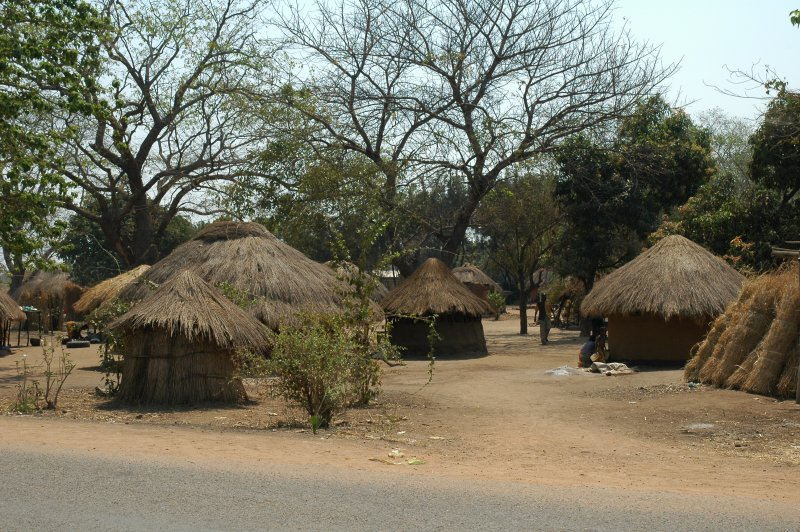
A village within the town of Mfuwe.

=== September 1991 ===
Despite attempts by both hunters and local game wardens to kill the man-eater, three more fatal attacks would occur before the lion's reign of terror would come to an end, with the final incident elevating the lion in the minds of locals from a simple animal to one that was possessed by a demon or sorcerer. The victim, a woman named Jesleen, was dragged from her rondavel and killed, with the lion returning the following day and re-entering the home, taking with him a cloth bag containing the woman's clothing. The lion carried and toyed with the bag within the village before being driven away by villagers, taking the item with him, with it eventually being found a mile away from the scene of the attack.

Just a day prior to his own death, the man-eater attempted to predate a 14-year old boy who had been out in a field, however the youth fled to a hut and managed to escape unharmed.

=== Causes of the attacks ===
Post-mortem examination of the Man-eater of Mfuwe's remains showed the lion to have been suffering from a severe jaw fracture in life, an injury that would have caused the cat considerable pain and made opening his mouth difficult, thus preventing him from successfully bringing down typical prey such as zebra and buffalo. As well, dental microphotographs of his teeth showed the lion had been avoiding consuming the bones of his victims, something indicative of his injury.

== Hunt ==
The combined efforts of Wayne Hosek, an American big game hunter and his companion Charl Beukes (sometimes spelled "Buekes"), a fellow professional hunter, would bring about the end of the man-eater.

Initially, the men set up a hunting blind nearby to where Jesleen's bag had been abandoned, using hippo meat placed on the ground as bait, but this attempt proved unsuccessful. Beukes would select the site of the second blind, with the pair taking more precautions to hide their presence from the lion, including having others construct the hide as to obscure the hunters' scent.

After several days, the man-eater would eventually come within range and Hosek fired the fatal shot, striking the lion below and behind his left shoulder. Villagers would soon gather, spitting on and beating the animal's carcass, along with singing and lighting fires in celebration of the animal's death.

=== Museum display ===
Wayne Hosek donated the taxidermied remains of the man-eater to the Field Museum of Natural History on 2 September 1998. The specimen has remained on display at the museum since, showcased in a diorama that includes a cloth bag reminiscent of the one he famously stole in life.

Incidentally, the museum is also home to the remains of the Man-eaters of Tsavo, a pair of similarly maneless lions who were responsible for the deaths of several dozen people in 1898.

=== Book ===
On September 20th, 2011, Wayne Hosek published a book detailing his hunt for the lion titled "The Man-eater of Mfuwe".
