= John Henry Patterson (author) =

British Army officer, hunter and author (1867–1947)

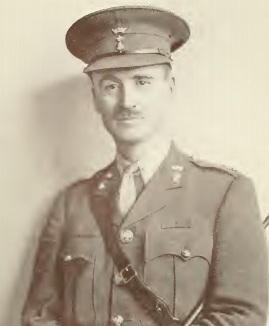
- Born: 10 November 1867; Forgney, County Longford
- Died: 18 June 1947 (aged 79); Bel Air, Los Angeles
- Burial place: Avihayil, Israel
- Spouse: Frances Helena Gray (m. 1895)
- Children: Bryan Patterson
- Military career
- Allegiance: United Kingdom
- Branch: British Army
- Service years: 1884–1920
- Rank: Lieutenant colonel
- Commands: Jewish Legion
- Conflicts: Second Boer War; World War I; Sinai and Palestine campaign
- Awards: Distinguished Service Order

Lieutenant-Colonel John Henry Patterson (10 November 1867 – 18 June 1947) was a British Army officer, hunter, and author best known for his book The Man-eaters of Tsavo (1907), which details Patterson's experiences during the construction of a railway bridge over the Tsavo River in the East Africa Protectorate from 1898 to 1899. The book went on to inspire three films: Bwana Devil (1952), Killers of Kilimanjaro (1959), and The Ghost and the Darkness (1996). During the First World War, Patterson served as the commander of the British Army's Jewish Legion, which has been described as the first precursor to the Israel Defense Forces.

== Biography ==
=== Youth and army service ===
Patterson was born in 1867 in Forgney, Ballymahon, County Longford, Ireland, to a Protestant father and Roman Catholic mother.

He joined the British Army in 1885 at the age of seventeen and eventually attained the rank of Lieutenant-Colonel and was awarded the Distinguished Service Order (DSO). He retired from the army in 1920.

=== East African adventures ===
In 1898, Patterson was commissioned by the Uganda Railway committee in London to oversee the construction of a railway bridge over the Tsavo River in present-day Kenya. He arrived at the site in March of that year.

==== Tsavo railway and man-eaters ====
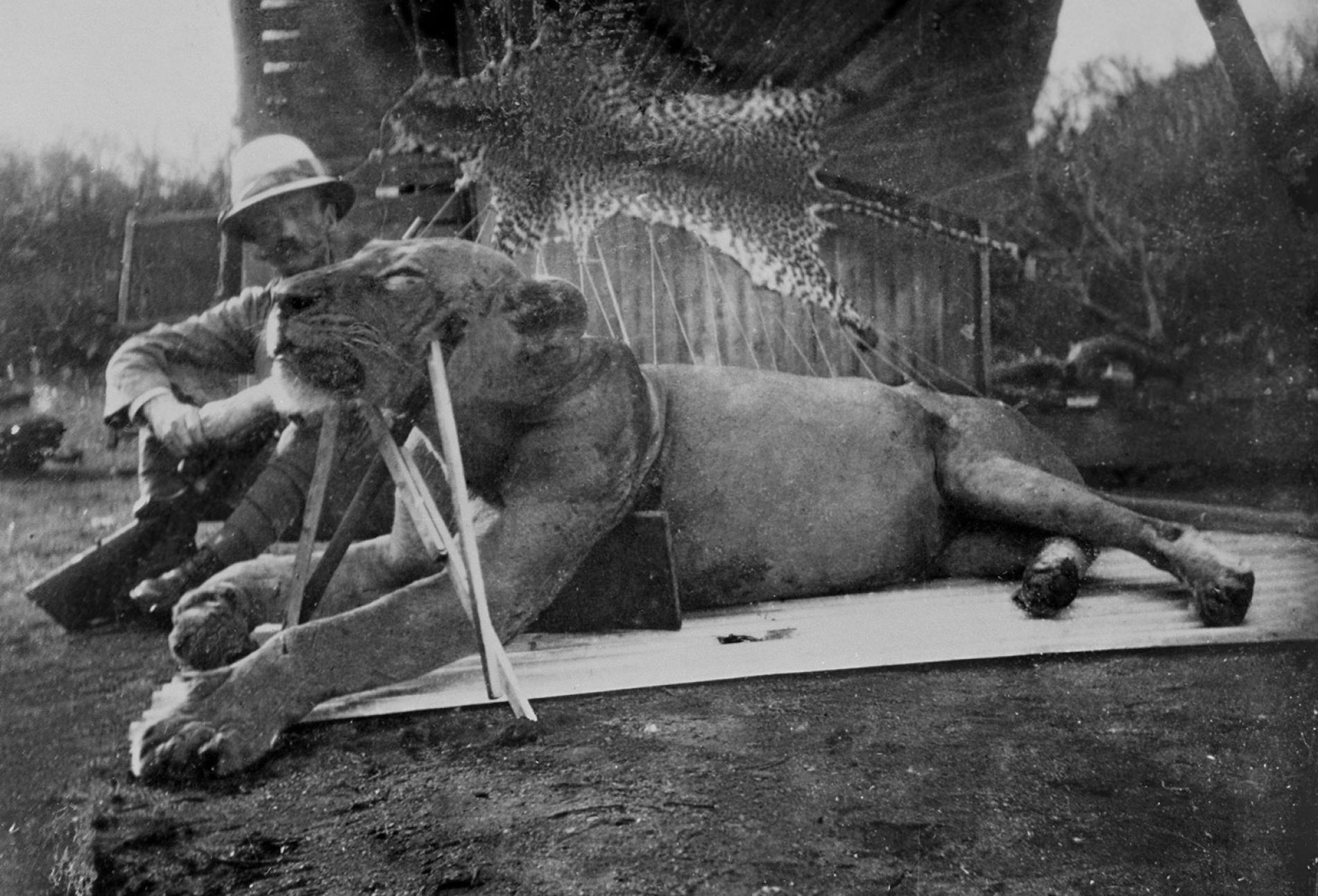
Lieutenant-Colonel Patterson with the first Tsavo lion – killed 9 December 1898

Almost immediately after Patterson's arrival, lion attacks began to take place on the workforce, with the lions dragging men out of their tents at night and feeding on their victims. Despite the building of thorn barriers (bomas) around the camps, bonfires at night, and strict after-dark curfews, the attacks escalated dramatically, to the point where the bridge construction ceased due to a fearful, mass departure by the workers. Along with the obvious financial consequences of the work stoppage, Patterson faced the challenge of maintaining his authority and even his personal safety at this remote site against the increasingly hostile and superstitious workers, many of whom were convinced that the lions were in fact evil spirits, come to punish those who worked at Tsavo, and that he was the cause of the misfortune because the attacks had coincided with his arrival.

The man-eating behaviour was considered highly unusual for lions and was eventually confirmed to be the work of a pair of rogue males, who were believed to be responsible for as many as 140 deaths. Railway records attribute only 28 worker deaths to the lions, but the predators were also reported to have killed a significant number of local people of which no official record was ever kept, which attributed to the railway's smaller record.

Various theories have been put forward to account for the lions' man-eating behaviour: poor burial practices, low populations of food source animals due to disease, etc. There was a slave trade route through the area, which contributed to a considerable number of abandoned bodies. Patterson reported seeing considerable instances of unburied human remains and open graves in the area, and it is believed that the lions (which, like most predators, will readily scavenge for food) adapted to this abundant, accessible food supply and eventually turned to humans as their primary food source. A modern analysis shows one of the lion's skulls had a badly abscessed canine tooth that could have hindered normal hunting behaviour. However, this hypothesis accounts for the behaviour of only one of the lions involved, and Patterson himself had disclaimed such theories, saying he had damaged the lion's tooth himself.

With his reputation, livelihood, and safety at stake, Patterson, an experienced tiger hunter from his military service in India, undertook an extensive effort to deal with the crisis. After months of attempts and near misses, he killed the first lion on the night of 9 December 1898 and the second one on the morning of 29 December (narrowly escaping death when the wounded animal charged him). The lions were maneless like many others in the Tsavo area, and both were exceptionally large. Each lion was over nine feet long from nose to tip of tail and required at least eight men to carry it back to the camp.

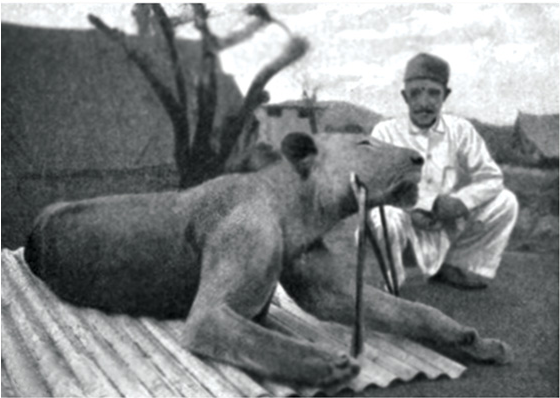
The second Tsavo lion – killed 29 December 1898

The workers and local people immediately declared Patterson a hero, and word of the event quickly spread far and wide, as evidenced by the subsequent telegrams of congratulations he received. Word of the incident was even mentioned in the House of Lords, by the Prime Minister Lord Salisbury.

With the man-eater threat eliminated, the workforce returned and the Tsavo railway bridge was completed on 7 February 1899. Although the rails were destroyed by German soldiers during the First World War, the stone foundations were left standing and the bridge was subsequently repaired. The workers, who in earlier months had all but threatened to kill him, presented Patterson with a silver bowl in appreciation for the risks he had undertaken on their behalf, with the following inscription:

"SIR, – We, your Overseer, Timekeepers, Mistaris and Workmen, present you with this bowl as a token of our gratitude to you for your bravery in killing two-man-eating lions at great risk to your own life, thereby saving us from the fate of being devoured by these terrible monsters who nightly broke into our tents and took our fellow-workers from our side. In presenting you with this bowl, we all add our prayers for your long life, happiness and prosperity. We shall ever remain, Sir, Your grateful servants, Baboo PURSHOTAM HURJEE PURMAR, Overseer and Clerk of Works, on behalf of your Workmen. Dated at Tsavo, 30 January 1899."

Patterson considered the bowl to be his most highly prized and hardest won trophy.

In 1907, he published his first book, The Man-Eaters of Tsavo, which documented his adventures during his time there. It was the basis for three films; Bwana Devil (1953), Killers of Kilimanjaro (1959) and the 1996 Paramount Pictures film, The Ghost and the Darkness, starring Val Kilmer (as Patterson) and Michael Douglas (as the fictional character "Remington").

In 1924, after speaking at the Field Museum of Natural History in Chicago, Illinois, Patterson agreed to sell the Tsavo lion skins and skulls to the museum for the then sizeable sum of $5,000. The lion skins were then stuffed and are now on permanent display along with the original skulls. The reconstructed lions are actually smaller than their original size, due to their skins' having been trimmed for use as trophy rugs in Patterson's house.

==== Eland discovery ====
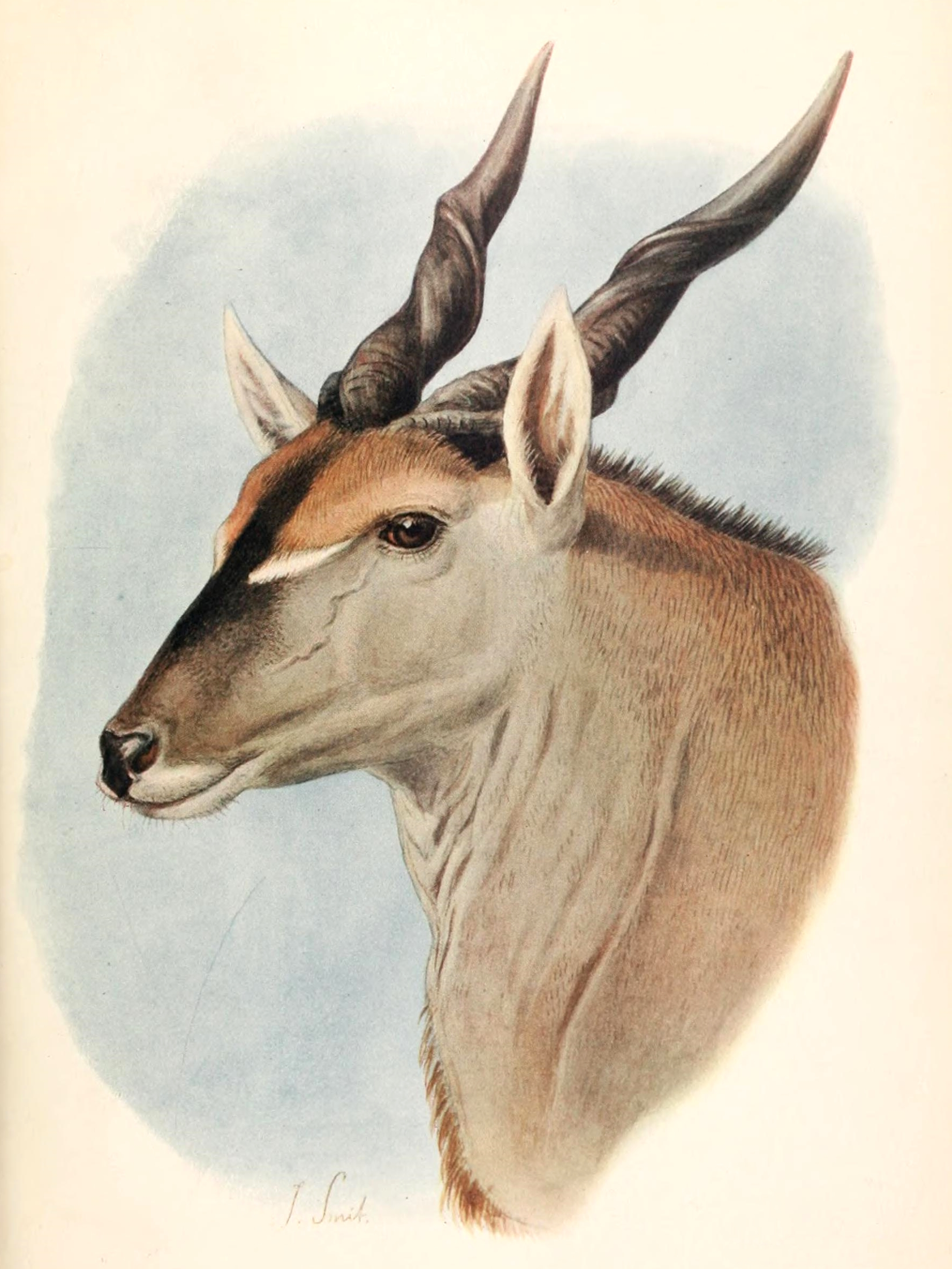
Taurotragus oryx pattersonianus by Joseph Smit (1907)

In 1906, Patterson returned to the Tsavo area for a hunting trip. During the trip, he shot an eland, which he noted possessed different features from elands in Southern Africa, where the species was first recognized. On returning to England, Patterson had the head of the eland mounted, where it was seen by Richard Lydekker, a member of the faculty of the British Museum. Lydekker identified Patterson's trophy as a new subspecies of eland, which Lydekker named Taurotragus oryx pattersonianius.

==== Game warden and Blyth ====
Colonial Secretary Lord Elgin appointed Colonel Patterson to the post of Game Warden – that is, superintendent of game reserves in the East Africa Protectorate, an experience he recounts in his second book, In the Grip of Nyika (1909).

While on a safari in 1908 with Audley Blyth, a son of James Blyth, 1st Baron Blyth, and Blyth's wife Ethel, Patterson's reputation was tarnished by Blyth's death by a gunshot wound (possible suicide – exact circumstances unknown). Witnesses confirmed that Patterson was not in Blyth's tent when the shooting took place, and that it was in fact Blyth's wife who was with him at the time, as she was reported as having run screaming from the tent immediately following the shooting. Patterson had Blyth buried in the wilderness and then insisted on continuing the expedition instead of returning to the nearest post to report the incident.

Shortly after, in poor health, Patterson returned to England with Mrs. Blyth amid rumours of murder and an affair. Although he was never officially charged or censured, this incident followed him for years after in British society and in the army. His case was raised in Parliament in April 1909. The incident was referenced in the film The Macomber Affair (1947), which was based on Ernest Hemingway's short story "The Short Happy Life of Francis Macomber" (1936).

=== War service ===
==== Second Boer War ====
Patterson joined the Essex Imperial Yeomanry for the Second Boer War (1899–1902), and served with the 20th Battalion, Imperial Yeomanry, for which he was awarded the Distinguished Service Order in November 1900. He returned home, but was again called for service when on 17 January 1902 he was appointed to command the 33rd Battalion, Imperial Yeomanry, with the temporary rank of lieutenant-colonel. The battalion left Southampton on SS Assaye in May 1902, arriving in South Africa after the war had ended with the Peace of Vereeniging. Patterson left Cape Town again on the SS Aurania in early January 1903, and arrived back in Southampton in early February, the same month he relinquished the command of the battalion.

==== Ulster Volunteer Force ====
Colonel Patterson commanded the West Belfast regiment of the Ulster Volunteers during the Home Rule Crisis of 1913–14. The Ulster Volunteers was a Unionist militia founded in 1912 to prevent Irish Home Rule. The Ulster Volunteers were based in the northern province of Ulster, with most of the organisation's 90,000 members coming from what is today Northern Ireland. Many Ulster Protestants feared being governed by an Irish Catholic-majority parliament in Dublin. In 1913, the militias were organised into the 'Ulster Volunteer Force' (UVF) and vowed to resist any attempts by the British Government to impose Home Rule on Ulster.

In April 1914, the UVF smuggled 20,000 rifles and 2,000,000 rounds of ammunition into Ulster from Germany. Colonel Patterson is believed to have been part of this operation with some of the weapons being stored at Fernhill House, HQ of the West Belfast regiment.

The Home Rule Crisis was halted by the outbreak of the First World War in August 1914.

==== First World War ====
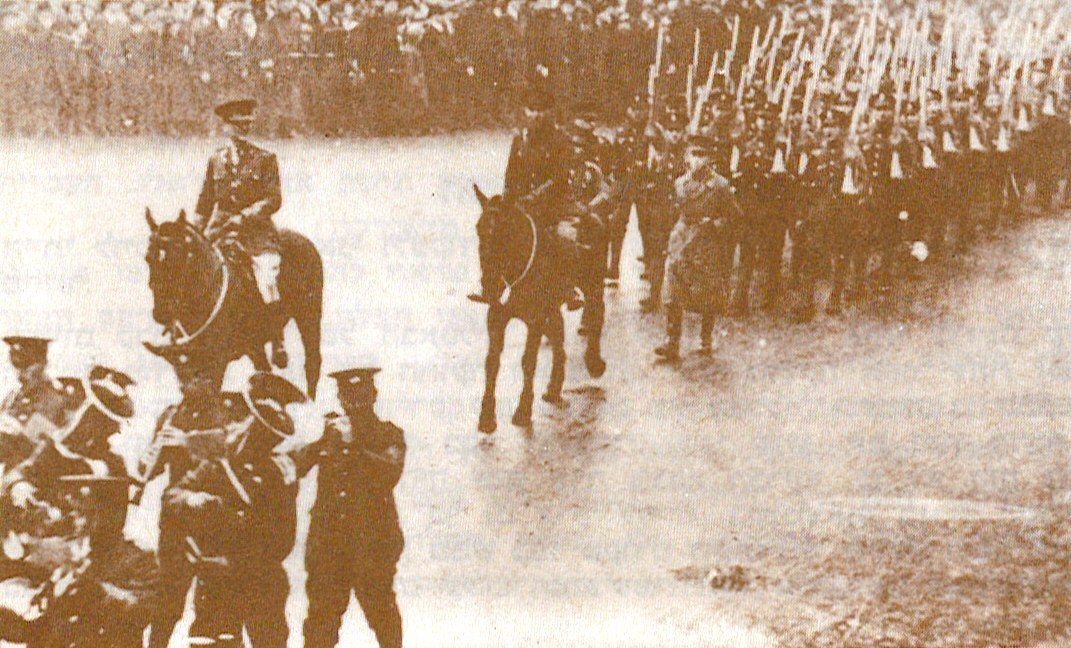
The 38th battalion of the Royal Fusiliers, led by Patterson (lead horse – left), marches in the streets of London, February 1918

Patterson served in the First World War. Although he was himself a Protestant, he became a major figure in Zionism as the commander of both the Zion Mule Corps and later the 38th Battalion of the Royal Fusiliers (also known as the Jewish Legion) which would eventually serve as the foundation of the Israeli Defence Force decades later. The Zion Mule Corps, which served with distinction in the Gallipoli Campaign has been described as "the first Jewish fighting force in nearly two millennia".

During his time in command of the Jewish Legion (which served with distinction in the Palestine Campaign), Patterson was forced to deal with extensive, ongoing antisemitism toward his men from many of his superiors (as well as peers and subordinates), and more than once threatened to resign his commission to bring the inappropriate treatment of his men under scrutiny. He retired from the British Army in 1920 as a lieutenant-colonel (the same rank he held when the war started) after thirty-five years of service. It is generally accepted that much of the admiration and respect of his men (and modern-day supporters) is due to the fact that he essentially sacrificed any opportunity for promotion (and his military career in general) in his efforts to ensure his men were treated fairly. His last two books, With the Zionists at Gallipoli (1916) and With the Judaeans in the Palestine Campaign (1922) are based on his experiences during these times.

"The formation of a Battalion of Jews for service in the British Army is an event without precedent in our annals, and the part played by such a unique unit is assured of a niche in history owing to the fact that it fought in Palestine, not only for the British cause, but also for the Restoration of the Jewish people to the Promised Land. In writing the following narrative, my object has been to give a faithful account of the doings of this Jewish Battalion while it was under my command."

=== Advocacy of Zionism ===
After his military career, Patterson continued his support of Zionism. He remained a strong advocate of justice for the Jewish people as an active member of the Bergson Group and a promoter of a Jewish army to fight the Nazis and to stop The Holocaust. He was a member of the Emergency Committee to Save the Jewish People of Europe. During the Second World War, while he was in America, the British government cut off his pension, arguing they had no way to securely transmit his funds to him. This left Patterson in severe financial difficulty. He energetically continued working toward the establishment of a separate Jewish state in the Middle East, which became a reality with the statehood of Israel on 14 May 1948, less than a year after his death.

Patterson was close friends with many Zionist supporters and leaders, among them Ze'ev Jabotinsky and Benzion Netanyahu. According to Benzion's younger son Benjamin Netanyahu, who later became Prime Minister of Israel, Benzion named his first son, Yonatan Netanyahu, after Patterson. Patterson attended Yonatan Netanyahu's circumcision and gave him a silver cup engraved with the words "To my beloved godson Yonatan from Lt.-Col. John Henry Patterson".

=== Family ===
He married Frances Helena Gray of Belfast in 1895. She, in 1890, had been one of the first women to take a Doctor of Laws (LLD) in the UK. Their son Bryan Patterson (1909–79) became a palaeontologist at the Field Museum in Chicago.

=== Later life, death and final request ===
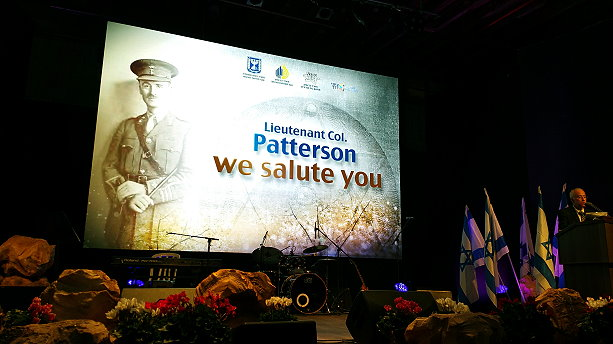
Picture of the reburial ceremony

During the 1940s, Patterson and his wife, "Francie", lived in a modest home in La Jolla, California. Eventually, with his wife in need of regular medical care and his own health in decline, he took up residence at the home of his friend Marion Travis in Bel Air, where he eventually died in his sleep at seventy-nine years of age. His wife died six weeks later in a San Diego nursing home. Both Patterson and his wife were cremated, and their ashes were interred at Angelus-Rosedale Cemetery, niche 952-OC in Los Angeles. According to Patterson's grandson, Alan Patterson, one of his final wishes was that both he and his wife eventually be interred in Israel, ideally with or close to the men he commanded during the First World War.

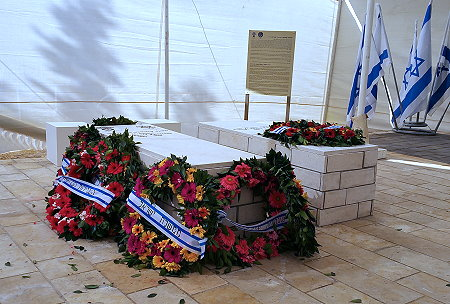
The reburial ceremony in Avihayil, Israel on 4 December 2014

Alan Patterson, the Jewish American Society for Historic Preservation, Canadian representative Todd Young, Beit HaGedudim (the museum of the Jewish Legion), and the moshav (village) of Avihayil (represented by Ezekiel Sivak) began a coordinated effort to honour this request in 2010. With the assistance and support of the Israeli government and Prime Minister Benjamin Netanyahu, on 4 December 2014, the remains of Patterson and his wife were re-interred in the Avihayil cemetery where some of the men he commanded are buried. Attending the ceremony were Prime Minister Netanyahu, members of his family, military and cabinet members of the Israeli government, the British Ambassador, the Irish Ambassador, Alan Patterson, Jerry Klinger of the Jewish American Society for Historic Preservation, Ezekiel Sivak of Avihayil, representatives and descendent family members of the Jewish Legion, Christians supporters of Israel, 350 guests and numerous other dignitaries. Netanyahu referred to Patterson as "the godfather of the Israeli army" and "a great friend of our people, a great champion of Zionism and a great believer in the Jewish State and the Jewish people... I feel it is an obligation of our people, our State and mine personally to fulfil his testimony".

A souvenir plate postal stamp was issued by the Israel Philatelic Service in Patterson's honour.

== Works ==
- The Man-Eaters of Tsavo and Other East African Adventures London: Macmillan and Co., 1907
- In the Grip of the Nyika; Further Adventures in British East Africa London: Macmillan and Co., 1909
- With the Zionists in Gallipoli London: Hutchinson, 1916
- With the Judaeans in the Palestine Campaign London: Hutchinson, 1922

== See also ==
- Tsavo Man-Eaters
- W. D. M. Bell
