= J. R. Eyerman =

American photographer and photojournalist (1906–1985)

J. R. Wharton Eyerman (9 November 1906 – 7 December 1985) was an American photographer and photojournalist.

== Early life ==
Eyerman was born in his parents' Butte, Montana photography studio. In a biographical vignette that Life often published on their photographers and writers on the title page, he explained, in verse, that the mysterious letters preceding his surname were not initials for any actual names;

My mama don tole me,
That she wouldn't give me,
A name like Walter or Moe:
So she done give me a mess of initials,
Said, "Son pick up a name as you go."

He left Butte to study civil engineering at the University of Washington in Seattle.

== Life magazine ==
Eyerman was on staff for Life magazine from 1942 to 1961. He covered World War II for Life on the European and Pacific fronts. He once said

Pressing the button for LIFE magazines just made the world stand still.

Among his most famous photographs is the oft-reproduced long-shot of movie audience members all wearing 3-D glasses while watching the premiere of Bwana Devil in Hollywood in November 1952.

Such visual repetition was a favorite device; another example is Eyerman's expansive aerial shot for Life of multiple moving vans simultaneously emptying furniture into newly built houses on a Lakeview suburban street that stretches to the horizon, while his picture of a receding crowd of engineers at their drafting tables in a vast office space was selected by curator Edward Steichen for the world-touring Museum of Modern Art exhibition The Family of Man that was seen by 9 million visitors.

Previously, at MoMA, Eyerman had contributed to Memorable Life Photographs, November 20 – December 12, 1951; and Korea - The Impact of War in Photographs, February 13 – April 22, 1951, in which five of his G.I. portraits were shown; and later his work appeared in Photographs from the Museum Collection, November 26, 1958 – January 18, 1959, also at the Museum of Modern Art.

He left Life in 1961 to work for Time, National Geographic, and several medical magazines.

== Technical innovations ==
After opening his own structural engineering firm in Seattle, he developed new tools to photograph in difficult situations. In his 1957 book, author Stanley Rayfield noted that

Eyerman's technical innovations have helped push back the frontiers of photography. He perfected an electric eye mechanism to trip the shutters of nine cameras to make pictures of an atomic blast [at Yucca Flat, Nevada, in 1952]; devised [with Otis Barton] a special camera for taking pictures 3600 feet beneath the surface of the ocean; successfully "speeded up" color film to make previously impossible color pictures of the shimmering, changing forms and patterns of the aurora borealis.

== Death ==
Eyerman died of kidney failure and heart failure at his home in Santa Monica, California.
