= Vice Squad (1953 film) =

1953 film by Arnold Laven

- Theatrical release poster
- Directed by: Arnold Laven
- Screenplay by: Lawrence Roman
- Based on: Harness Bull; 1937 novel by Leslie T. White
- Produced by: Jules Levy; Arthur Gardner; Sol Lesser (uncredited)
- Starring: Edward G. Robinson; Paulette Goddard
- Cinematography: Joseph F. Biroc
- Edited by: Arthur H. Nadel
- Music by: Herschel Burke Gilbert
- Color process: Black and white
- Production company: Sequoia Pictures
- Distributed by: United Artists
- Release date: 1953
- Running time: 88 minutes
- Country: United States
- Language: English
- Budget: $262,000
- Box office: $600,000

Vice Squad is a 1953 American film noir crime film directed by Arnold Laven and starring Edward G. Robinson and Paulette Goddard. The film is also known as The Girl in Room 17.

== Plot ==
In Los Angeles, criminals Al Barkis and Pete Monte attempt to hotwire a car. In a nearby apartment building, Vickie Webb bids farewell to Jack Hartrampf, a much older married undertaker. Patrolman Kellogg attempts to arrest Monte inside the car, but is shot by Barkis. Hartrampf witnesses the shooting and after the criminals flee, he rushes to Kellogg's aid. A patrol car arrives, and Hartrampf is brought to police headquarters for questioning. Seeking to keep his affair concealed, he is reluctant to cooperate.

Captain Barnaby arrives at his office, and his secretary Ginny informs him that Kellogg remains in critical condition. Barnaby meets with Miss Easton, who believes an Italian count is leading on her mother. Barnaby advises that he needs more evidence to establish marriage fraud and assigns Sgt. Atkinson to investigate. In the hallway, he meets Frankie Pierce, an ex-convict on parole, who is seeking to avoid a violation and claims Barkis is planning a bank robbery.

Inside the interrogation room, Barnaby pleads with Hartrampf to identify the shooter, but he declines. During a police lineup, Barnaby assigns Lt. Chisolm to investigate Frankie's claims; meanwhile, Kellogg dies. Elsewhere, Barkis and his accomplices meet at a warehouse and wait for Dutch, who, unknown to them, has been detained for the lineup. He is released and arrives at the rendezvous, where he tells the agitated criminals that Kellogg is dead.

Back at the police station, Barnaby notifies bank president Schaefer about the planned robbery and sets up a trap. When Hartrampf's attorney, Dwight Foreman, arrives, a persuaded Hartrampf states that it was too dark to see either criminal. He is released and immediately re-arrested on a false charge to sweat him. Barnaby is also told that Mona Ross, who runs an escort service, is unwilling to collaborate unless two of her girls are released. Barnaby complies. Elsewhere, at the station, Alfredo Di Nova, the self-described count, is detained.

Barkis and his accomplices stage their robbery without their backup man Marty Kusalich, who has abandoned the gang. Chisolm and his undercover officers exchange gunfire, leaving Dutch and another robber shot dead. Barkis wounds Chisolm, takes Carol Lawson, a young bank teller, hostage and escapes. Hartrampf is released and is arrested again under another pretense. Barnaby phones a reticent Mona and has his officers apprehend her for interrogation.

Mona reveals that one of her girls, Dolores, has been seeing Marty, who is soon arrested at her apartment. During interrogation, Marty claims he did not know about the robbery. When ballistic evidence confirms that Barkis had shot both Kellogg and Chisolm, Barnaby schemes to implicate Marty to force him to confess. Fearful of identifying the real killer, Hartrampf falsely fingers Marty. Threatened with the death penalty, Marty confesses on Barkis and Monte and reveals the location of the warehouse. Di Nova is revealed to be an imposter and is instructed to leave town or face criminal charges.

Per their plan, Monte motors a powerboat towards the waterfront hideout, where Barkis holds Carol hostage. Carol attempts to escape, but drops her glasses. Barnaby appears and rescues her, and then Detective Lacey shoots Barkis dead. Monte arrives shortly after and is arrested. Carol calls her mother on the radio-telephone to tell her she is safe.

== Cast ==
- Edward G. Robinson as Capt. Barnaby
- Paulette Goddard as Mona Ross
- K.T. Stevens as Ginny
- Porter Hall as Jack Hartrampf
- Adam Williams as Marty Kusalich
- Edward Binns as Al Barkis
- Barry Kelley as Dwight Foreman
- Jay Adler as Frankie Pierce
- Mary Ellen Kay as Carol Lawson
- Joan Vohs as Vickie Webb
- Lee Van Cleef as Pete Monte
- Harlan Warde as Det. Lacey
- Dan Riss as Lt. Bob Inlay
- Lewis Martin as Lt. Ed Chisolm
- Byron Kane as Prof. Bruno Varney
- Christine White as Miss Easton
