= Terror at Midnight =

1956 film by Franklin Adreon

- Theatrical release poster
- Directed by: Franklin Adreon
- Written by: John K. Butler; Irving Shulman
- Produced by: Rudy Ralston
- Starring: Scott Brady; Joan Vohs; Frank Faylen
- Cinematography: Bud Thackery
- Edited by: Tony Martinelli
- Music by: R. Dale Butts
- Color process: Black and white
- Production company: Republic Pictures
- Distributed by: Republic Pictures
- Release date: 1956
- Running time: 70 minutes
- Country: United States
- Language: English

Terror at Midnight is a 1956 American film noir crime film directed by Franklin Adreon and starring Scott Brady, Joan Vohs and Frank Faylen.

The film's sets were designed by art director Walter E. Keller.

== Plot ==
Rick Rickards, a cop, lends his car to Susan Lang, his fiancée. She accidentally runs into a night watchman riding a bicycle. An eyewitness named Speegle suggests she flee the scene before the watchman regains consciousness.

Susan takes the car to an auto shop run by Fred Hill, who recognizes it as Rick's vehicle. What she doesn't know is that Hill is in business with a couple of criminals, Hanlon and Mascotti. The men are concerned about Hill's alcoholic wife, Helen, who knows too much about their activities.

Speegle shows up at Susan's home, hoping to blackmail her for $500. He finds out her boyfriend is a cop and scrams. Susan is told by Hill that he needs more time to repair her car, Hill now realizing that the car's been involved in an accident, information he can use. Helen, seeing her husband and Susan together, believes he is seeing another woman and, in a fit of drunken jealousy, gets into a truck and runs down Hill, killing him.

Susan ends up suspected of the crime. Helen, in a panic and eager to leave town, goes to Hanlon and Mascotti threatening to tell everything she knows unless they pay her $5,000. They kill her instead. Susan finds the body and becomes the prime suspect in two murders now.

Rick offers to resign from the force, but is urged to stay on it and solve the case. He and another officer end up in a car chase, forcing Hanlon and Mascotti off the road, arresting one and shooting the other. Susan is cleared of all charges and Rick takes her home.

== Cast ==
- Scott Brady as Neal 'Rick' Rickards
- Joan Vohs as Susan Lang
- Frank Faylen as Fred Hill
- John Dehner as Lew Hanlon
- Virginia Gregg as Helen Hill
- Ric Roman as Police Sgt. Brazzi
- John Gallaudet as George Flynn
- Kem Dibbs as Nick Mascotti
- Percy Helton as Speegie
- Francis De Sales as Police Lt. Conway
- John Maxwell as Police Capt. Allyson
- Rick Vallin as Police Officer Gaudino
- John Damler as Police Officer Garfinkle
- Jose Gonzales-Gonzales as Delivery Man
- Joi Lansing as Hazel
- Ruth Lee as Mrs. Lang
- Doris Singleton as Linda
- Marjorie Stapp as Waitress
- Marcia Sweet as Neighborhood Woman
- Dan Terranova as The Kid
- Rod Williams as Police Officer Udell

== See also ==
- List of American films of 1956

== Bibliography ==
- Koper, Richard. Fifties Blondes: Sexbombs, Sirens, Bad Girls and Teen Queens. BearManor Media, 2010.
