= A Family Upside Down =

1978 television film directed by David Lowell Rich

- Written by: Gerald Di Pego
- Directed by: David Lowell Rich
- Starring: Helen Hayes; Fred Astaire; Efrem Zimbalist Jr.; Pat Crowley; Patty Duke
- Composer: Henry Mancini
- Country of origin: United States
- Original language: English

Production
- Producers: Ross Hunter; Jacques Mapes
- Cinematography: Joseph Biroc
- Editor: Richard Bracken
- Running time: 98 minutes
- Production company: Ross Hunter Productions

Original release
- Network: NBC
- Release: April 9, 1978

A Family Upside Down is a 1978 American drama television film directed by David Lowell Rich and written by Gerald Di Pego. It stars Helen Hayes and Fred Astaire as Ted and Emma Long, an elderly married couple, with Efrem Zimbalist Jr., Pat Crowley, and Patty Duke in supporting roles.

The film was praised for the performances of the cast, earning Astaire a Primetime Emmy Award for Outstanding Lead Actor in a Drama or Comedy Special. It also won a Golden Globe Award for Best Television Film.

== Plot ==
Ted Long is a retiree who suffers a debilitating heart attack that leaves him incapable of caring for himself. Unable to rely on his wife Emma, herself suffering from deteriorating health, Ted grows increasingly dependent on his adult children for his basic needs. Familial bonds are tested when Ted and Emma decide to move in with their son Mike and daughter-in-law Carol rather than face the prospect of living in a retirement home.

== Cast ==
- Helen Hayes as Emma Long
- Fred Astaire as Ted Long
- Efrem Zimbalist Jr. as Mike Long
- Pat Crowley as Carol Long
- Patty Duke as Wendy
- Brad Rearden as Scott Long
- Ford Rainey as Mr. Case
- Kim Hamilton as Paula
- Phillip R. Allen as Dr. Russo
- Carl Held as Al
- Lanna Saunders as Mrs. Lovell
- Belinda Palmer as Rhonda
- Miiko Taka as Mrs. Taka
- David Haskell as House Painter
- R. Norwood Smith as Wes Allen
- Charles Walker as Aide
- Gary Swanson as Instructor
- Gail Landry as Candy Striper
- Matthew Tobin as Dr. Chisholm
- Nolan Leary as Mr. Willy
- Ernestine Barrier as Mrs. Willy

== Awards and nominations ==
Year	Award	Category	Recipient	Result	Ref.
1978	Primetime Emmy Awards	Outstanding Lead Actor in a Drama or Comedy Special	Fred Astaire	Won	
1978	Primetime Emmy Awards	Outstanding Lead Actress in a Drama or Comedy Special	Helen Hayes	Nominated	
1978	Primetime Emmy Awards	Outstanding Performance by a Supporting Actor in a Comedy or Drama Special	Efrem Zimbalist Jr.	Nominated	
1978	Primetime Emmy Awards	Outstanding Performance by a Supporting Actress in a Comedy or Drama Special	Patty Duke	Nominated	
1978	Primetime Emmy Awards	Outstanding Cinematography in Entertainment Programming for a Special	Joseph Biroc	Nominated	
1979	Golden Globe Awards	Best Television Movie		Won	
