= Joseph Biroc =

American cinematographer (1903–1996)

- Born: Joseph Francis Biroc; February 12, 1903; New York City, New York, U.S.
- Died: September 7, 1996 (aged 93); Woodland Hills, California, US
- Occupation: Cinematographer
- Years active: 1927–1989
- Awards: See below

Joseph Francis Biroc, ASC (February 12, 1903 – September 7, 1996) was an American cinematographer. Born in New York City, he entered the film industry in 1918 as a laboratory technician in Fort Lee, New Jersey, and moved to Los Angeles in 1927, where he worked as a camera operator at RKO Pictures. During World War II he served in the U.S. Army Signal Corps, filming the Liberation of Paris in August 1944. He later worked as a freelance cinematographer at various studios and frequently collaborated with the director Robert Aldrich.

In addition to his film work, which included It's a Wonderful Life (1946) and The Flight of the Phoenix (1965), Biroc worked on various television series, including Adventures of Superman.

Biroc won the Academy Award for Best Cinematography for The Towering Inferno (1974), which he shared with Fred J. Koenekamp, having previously been nominated for Hush...Hush, Sweet Charlotte (1964). He also won two Primetime Emmy Awards, one for the television film Brian's Song and one for the series Casablanca. In 1988, he received the American Society of Cinematographers' Lifetime Achievement Award for his body of work.

== Early life ==
Joseph Francis Biroc was born on February 12, 1903, in New York City. He developed a passion for film in childhood. He recalled seeing his first film in 1910 on a vacant lot five blocks from his home, and said he knew from then that he wanted to spend his life making movies.

== Career ==
=== Early work and RKO ===
At the age of fifteen, with his uncle's help, Biroc began his career as a film laboratory technician with Paragon Labs in Fort Lee, New Jersey, in 1918. The apprenticeship began a series of jobs at various laboratories, which was then a standard route for aspiring cinematographers.

He worked at Craftsman Labs in New York from 1920 to 1923, then briefly for Goldwyn Pictures in Culver City, California, in 1923. He then returned to New York and took a job as a film printer for Famous Players–Lasky, where he was soon promoted to assistant cameraman. After Famous Players–Lasky shut down in 1927, Biroc moved to Los Angeles to work for United Artists, before moving to RKO as a camera operator. At RKO he served as an assistant to the cinematographers Leo Tover, Robert De Grasse and Edward Cronjager, and worked on films including Cimarron (1931), Sylvia Scarlett (1935), A Woman Rebels (1936), Swing Time (1936), Shall We Dance (1937) and Five Came Back (1939), though he received no screen credit, as RKO rarely credited camera operators. His last work before World War II was Bombardier (1943).

=== World War II ===
In 1943, Biroc became a motion picture cameraman in the U.S. Army Signal Corps. He filmed the Liberation of Paris in August 1944. In 1945 he filmed conditions at the Dachau concentration camp in Germany while attached to George Stevens's Special Motion Picture Coverage Unit. He rose to the rank of captain and later major.

=== Postwar film and television work ===
Biroc received his first screen credit as a cinematographer on It's a Wonderful Life (1946), on which he worked alongside the cinematographer Joseph Walker. He was later the cinematographer on Bwana Devil (1952), described as the first American feature-length colour film shot in 3-D.

In 1952, Biroc began his association with the producer-director Robert Aldrich, starting with an episode of The Doctor and continuing with films such as World for Ransom (1954), Attack (1956), Hush...Hush, Sweet Charlotte (1964), for which he received his first Oscar nomination, The Flight of the Phoenix (1965) and The Longest Yard (1974). He also shot material for network television early on, including musical shorts featuring Duke Ellington, Nat King Cole and Louis Armstrong, which was unusual for cameramen at the time. For much of the 1950s he worked mainly in television, in both black and white and colour, and he ended his career in the 1970s and 1980s working on television films, specials and miniseries.

Biroc wrote several articles on his working methods for American Cinematographer, including accounts of shooting the miniseries Washington: Behind Closed Doors (1977), in which sets were built with full ceilings so that they would resemble real locations, and of his work with the director Wim Wenders on Hammett (1982), where he described his approach as basic lighting and photography in the manner of earlier decades.

== Death ==
Biroc died on September 7, 1996, in Woodland Hills, California, aged 93. He was survived by a sister, Agnes Kronmeyer of Cranford, New Jersey, and four grandchildren.

== Filmography ==
=== Film ===
Year	Title	Director	Notes
1929	The Rescue	Herbert Brenon	with George Barnes & James Wong Howe
1943	Bombardier	Richard Wallace	
1946	It's a Wonderful Life	Frank Capra	with Joseph Walker
1947	Magic Town	William A. Wellman	
1948	On Our Merry Way	Leslie Fenton; King Vidor	
1948	My Dear Secretary	Charles Martin	
1949	Roughshod	Mark Robson	
1949	Johnny Allegro	Ted Tetzlaff	
1949	Mrs. Mike	Louis King	
1950	The Killer That Stalked New York	Earl McEvoy	
1951	Cry Danger	Robert Parrish	
1951	All That I Have	William F. Claxton	
1951	The Bushwhackers	Rod Amateau	
1952	Loan Shark	Seymour Friedman	
1952	Without Warning!	Arnold Laven	
1952	Red Planet Mars	Harry Horner	
1952	Bwana Devil	Arch Oboler	
1953	The Tall Texan	Elmo Williams	
1953	The Glass Wall	Maxwell Shane	
1953	The Twonky	Arch Oboler	
1953	Vice Squad	Arnold Laven	
1953	Donovan's Brain	Felix E. Feist	
1953	Appointment in Honduras	Jacques Tourneur	
1954	Riders to the Stars	Richard Carlson	Uncredited
1954	World for Ransom	Robert Aldrich	
1954	Down Three Dark Streets	Arnold Laven	
1954	The Steel Cage	Walter Doniger	
1955	Bengazi	John Brahm	
1956	Ghost Town	Allen H. Miner	
1956	Nightmare	Maxwell Shane	
1956	Quincannon, Frontier Scout	Lesley Selander	
1956	Attack	Robert Aldrich	
1956	Tension at Table Rock	Charles Marquis Warren	
1956	The Black Whip	Charles Marquis Warren	
1957	The Ride Back	Allen H. Miner	
1957	The Garment Jungle	Vincent Sherman	
1957	China Gate	Samuel Fuller	
1957	Run of the Arrow	Samuel Fuller	
1957	The Unknown Terror	Charles Marquis Warren	
1957	The Amazing Colossal Man	Bert I. Gordon	
1957	Forty Guns	Samuel Fuller	
1958	Underwater Warrior	Andrew Marton	
1958	Home Before Dark	Mervyn LeRoy	
1958	Born Reckless	Howard W. Koch	
1959	Verboten!	Samuel Fuller	
1959	The Bat	Crane Wilbur	
1959	The FBI Story	Mervyn LeRoy	
1960	Ice Palace	Vincent Sherman	
1960	13 Ghosts	William Castle	
1961	Gold of the Seven Saints	Gordon Douglas	
1961	Operation Eichmann	R. G. Springsteen	
1961	The Devil at 4 O'Clock	Mervyn LeRoy	
1961	Sail a Crooked Ship	Irving Brecher	
1962	Hitler	Stuart Heisler	
1962	Convicts 4	Millard Kaufman	
1962	Confessions of an Opium Eater	Albert Zugsmith	
1963	Bye Bye Birdie	George Sidney	
1963	Toys In The Attic	George Roy Hill	
1963	Promises! Promises!	King Donovan	
1963	Under the Yum Yum Tree	David Swift	
1963	Gunfight at Comanche Creek	Frank McDonald	
1964	Viva Las Vegas	George Sidney	
1964	Ride the Wild Surf	Don Taylor	
1964	Bullet for a Badman	R. G. Springsteen	
1964	To Trap a Spy	Don Medford	
1964	Kitten with a Whip	Douglas Heyes	
1964	The Young Lovers	Samuel Goldwyn Jr.	
1964	Hush...Hush, Sweet Charlotte	Robert Aldrich	
1965	I Saw What You Did	William Castle	
1965	The Flight of the Phoenix	Robert Aldrich	
1966	The Russians Are Coming the Russians Are Coming	Norman Jewison	
1966	The Swinger	George Sidney	
1966	Warning Shot	Buzz Kulik	
1967	Enter Laughing	Carl Reiner	
1967	Who's Minding the Mint?	Howard Morris	
1967	Tony Rome	Gordon Douglas	
1967	Fitzwilly	Delbert Mann	
1968	The Detective	Gordon Douglas	
1968	The Legend of Lylah Clare	Robert Aldrich	
1968	Lady in Cement	Gordon Douglas	
1968	The Killing of Sister George	Robert Aldrich	
1969	What Ever Happened to Aunt Alice?	Lee H. Katzin	
1970	Too Late the Hero	Robert Aldrich	
1971	Mrs. Pollifax-Spy	Leslie H. Martinson	
1971	Escape from the Planet of the Apes	Don Taylor	
1971	The Grissom Gang	Robert Aldrich	
1971	The Organization	Don Medford	
1972	Ulzana's Raid	Robert Aldrich	
1973	Emperor of the North Pole	Robert Aldrich	
1973	Cahill U.S. Marshal	Andrew V. McLaglen	
1974	Blazing Saddles	Mel Brooks	
1974	The Towering Inferno	John Guillermin	with Fred J. Koenekamp
1974	The Longest Yard	Robert Aldrich	
1974	Shanks	William Castle	
1975	Hustle	Robert Aldrich	
1976	The Duchess and the Dirtwater Fox	Melvin Frank	
1977	The Choirboys	Robert Aldrich	
1979	Beyond the Poseidon Adventure	Irwin Allen	
1980	Airplane!	Jim Abrahams; David Zucker; Jerry Zucker	
1981	...All the Marbles	Robert Aldrich	
1982	Hammett	Wim Wenders	with Philip H. Lathrop
1982	Airplane II: The Sequel	Ken Finkleman	

=== Television ===
Year	Title	Notes
1950	Dick Tracy	5 episodes
1952	China Smith	Episode: "Straight Settlement"
1952	Four Star Playhouse	Episode: "The Officer and the Lady"
1953	I'm the Law	14 episodes
1954	The Mickey Rooney Show	5 episodes
1954	Dear Phoebe	Episode: "The Christmas Show"
1954	The Lone Wolf	3 episodes
1954	Police Call	Episode: "Montreal"
1954-55	Treasury Men in Action	12 episodes
1955	The Man Behind the Badge	Episode: "The Case of the Hunted Hobo"
1955	My Friend Flicka	Episode: "The Stranger"
1955	Screen Directors Playhouse	Episode: "The Final Tribute"
1955-56	TV Reader's Digest	3 episodes
1956	General Electric Summer Originals	Episode: "It's Sunny Again"
1956-58	Adventures of Superman	26 episodes
1957	General Electric Theater	Episode: "Mr. Kensington's Finest Hour"
1957	Alfred Hitchcock Presents	Episode: "Silent Witness"
1957-58	Playhouse 90	3 episodes
1958	The Thin Man	Episode: "Unlucky Lucky Numbers"
1958	Hey, Jeannie!	Episode: "The Landlord"
1958	Alcoa Theatre	2 episodes
1959	Dick Powell's Zane Grey Theatre	Episode: "Checkmate"
1959	Richard Diamond, Private Detective	4 episodes
1959	The David Niven Show	Episode: "The Twist of the Key"
1959	The Detectives	Episode: "The Streger Affair"
1959-60	Hotel de Paree	2 episodes
1960	The DuPont Show with June Allyson	Episode: "Escape"
1960	Goodyear Theatre	Episode: "Author at Work"
1960-61	Checkmate	3 episodes
1962-63	Empire	4 episodes
1964	The Man from U.N.C.L.E.	Episode: "The Vulcan Affair"
1972	Ghost Story	Episode: "The New House"
1983	Casablanca	5 episodes
1985	Hell Town	Episode: "Father of Hell Town"

==== Television films and miniseries ====
Year	Title	Notes
1956	Cavalry Patrol	Failed pilot
1958	The Adventures of Superpup	Failed pilot
1971	Brian's Song	
1972	Gidget Gets Married	
1972	Playmates	
1972	The Crooked Hearts	
1974	Wonder Woman	Failed pilot
1974	Honky Tonk	
1974	Thursday's Game	
1976	The Moneychangers	
1977	Washington: Behind Closed Doors	
1977	SST: Death Flight	
1978	A Family Upside Down	
1978	Little Women	
1978	The Clone Master	
1980	Kenny Rogers as The Gambler	
1980	Scruples	
1982	Desperate Lives	
1984	The Jerk, Too	
1985	A Death in California	
1986	Outrage!	
1986	A Winner Never Quits	
1987	Time Out for Dad	

Refs:

== Awards and nominations ==
Institution	Year	Category	Work	Result	Ref.
Academy Awards	1965	Best Cinematography (Black & White)	Hush...Hush, Sweet Charlotte	Nominated	
Academy Awards	1975	Best Cinematography	The Towering Inferno	Won	
American Society of Cinematographers	1988	Lifetime Achievement Award	—N/a	Won	
Primetime Emmy Awards	1972	Outstanding Cinematography for a Movie Made for Television	Brian's Song	Won	
Primetime Emmy Awards	1977	Outstanding Cinematography for a Series	The Moneychangers ("Part 1")	Nominated	
Primetime Emmy Awards	1978	Outstanding Cinematography for a Movie Made for Television	A Family Upside Down	Nominated	
Primetime Emmy Awards	1978	Outstanding Cinematography for a Series	Washington: Behind Closed Doors ("Part 1")	Nominated	
Primetime Emmy Awards	1979	Outstanding Cinematography for a Series	Little Women ("Part 2")	Nominated	
Primetime Emmy Awards	1980	Outstanding Cinematography for Limited Series or Movie	Kenny Rogers as The Gambler	Nominated	
Primetime Emmy Awards	1983	Outstanding Cinematography for a Series	Casablanca ("The Masterbuilder's Woman")	Won	
Primetime Emmy Awards	1985	Outstanding Cinematography for Limited Series or Movie	A Death in California	Nominated	
Society of Camera Operators	1986	Lifetime Achievement Award	—N/a	Won	

== Bibliography and further reading ==
- Biroc, Joseph. "Hollywood Launches 3-D Production". American Cinematographer (Hollywood), August 1952.
- Biroc, Joseph. "Photographing Washington: Behind Closed Doors". American Cinematographer (Hollywood), November 1977.
- American Cinematographer (Hollywood), July 1981.
- Focus on Film (London), no. 13, 1973.
- Patterson, R. "On Hammett". American Cinematographer (Hollywood), November 1982.
- Basinger, Jeanine. The It's a Wonderful Life Book. 1987.
- American Cinematographer (Hollywood), March 1989.
- Obituary. American Cinematographer (Hollywood), November 1996.
- Obituary. Cinefantastique (Forest Park), vol. 28, no. 6, 1996.
