= Joan Vohs =

American model and actress

- Born: July 30, 1927; St. Albans, Queens, New York City, U.S.
- Died: June 4, 2001 (aged 73); Tarzana, Los Angeles, California, U.S.
- Other names: Joan Vohs Stephens; Elinor Joan Vohs
- Occupations: Actress, model
- Years active: 1949–1969
- Spouse: John G. Stephens (m. 1952)
- Children: 2

Joan Vohs (July 30, 1927 – June 4, 2001) was an American model and film and television actress.

== Early years ==
Vohs was a native of St. Albans, Queens, in New York City, the daughter of Mr. and Mrs William Vohs, who also had two younger daughters.

She danced with The Rockettes before becoming an actress. She later danced with Agnes DeMille's troupe and became a Conover model.

== Career ==
Vohs made her movie debut in Girls School for Columbia Pictures. She was an occasional hostess on the program Faith of Our Children.

She appeared on several episodes of Fireside Theater and on Bachelor Father, Family Affair, Maverick, and Perry Mason, among other programs.

== Personal life ==
Vohs married John Stephens in 1952. They had one son, William, and one daughter, Laurie. She was an active Sunday school teacher.

== Death ==
Vohs died on June 4, 2001, of heart failure in Tarzana, California, aged 73.

== Filmography ==
Year	Title	Role	Notes
1949	My Dream Is Yours	Party Guest	Uncredited
1949	The Girl from Jones Beach	Model	Uncredited
1949	It's a Great Feeling	Model	Uncredited
1949	Yes Sir, That's My Baby	Mrs. Flugeldorfer	
1949	The Inspector General	Peasant Girl	Uncredited
1950	Dangerous Inheritance		
1950	Girls' School	Jane Ellen	
1950	County Fair	Phyllis	Uncredited
1951	Royal Wedding	Dancer in Haiti Number	Uncredited
1951	As You Were	Sgt. Peggy P. Hopper	
1951	I'll See You In My Dreams	Chorine	Uncredited
1953	The Girl in Room 17	Vicke Webb	
1953	Fort Ti	Fortune Mallory	
1953	Vice Squad	Vickie Webb	
1953	Crazylegs	Ruth Stahmer	
1954	Sabrina	Gretchen Van Horn	
1954	Cry Vengeance	Lily Arnold	
1955	Fort Yuma	Melanie Crown	
1956	Terror at Midnight	Susan Lang	
1957	Lure of the Swamp	Cora Payne	

== Bibliography ==
- Pitts, Michael R. Western Movies: A Guide to 5,105 Feature Films. McFarland, 2012.
