= The Ghost and the Darkness =

1996 film by Stephen Hopkins

- Theatrical release poster
- Directed by: Stephen Hopkins
- Written by: William Goldman
- Based on: The Man-eaters of Tsavo by John Henry Patterson
- Produced by: Gale Anne Hurd; Paul B. Radin; A. Kitman Ho
- Starring: Michael Douglas; Val Kilmer
- Cinematography: Vilmos Zsigmond
- Edited by: Robert Brown; Roger Bondelli; Steve Mirkovich
- Music by: Jerry Goldsmith
- Production companies: Constellation Films; Douglas/Reuther Productions
- Distributed by: Paramount Pictures
- Release date: October 11, 1996
- Running time: 110 minutes
- Country: United States
- Language: English
- Budget: $55 million
- Box office: $75 million

The Ghost and the Darkness is a 1996 American historical adventure film directed by Stephen Hopkins and starring Val Kilmer and Michael Douglas. The screenplay, written by William Goldman, is a fictionalized account of the Tsavo man-eaters, a pair of lions that terrorized workers in and around Tsavo, Kenya in 1898.

The film received mixed reviews and grossed $75 million against a production budget of $55 million. It won the Academy Award for Best Sound Editing for supervising sound editor Bruce Stambler.

== Plot ==
In 1898, Robert Beaumont, the primary financier of a railway project in Tsavo, Kenya, seeks out the expertise of Lt. Colonel John Henry Patterson, an Anglo-Irish military engineer, to get the project on schedule. Patterson travels from England to Tsavo, promising his wife, Helena, that he will complete the bridge and return to London for their child's birth. Shortly after his arrival, he meets British supervisor Angus Starling, Kenyan foreman Samuel, and Doctor David Hawthorne. Hawthorne informs Patterson of a recent lion attack that has affected the undertaking.

That same night, Patterson ends the life of an approaching lion with a single gunshot, earning the respect of the laborers and allowing them to resume their activities safely. Only a few weeks later, however, a new lion drags Mahina, the construction foreman, from his tent. At sunrise, his mutilated body is recovered, and Patterson tries another nighttime hunt. In the morning, he is informed by Starling that the corpse of a second worker has been found at the opposite end of the camp from his position.

Heeding Samuel's advice, Patterson has thorn fences built around the tents to keep lions out. Several days later, in broad daylight, a lion assails the camp, killing another worker. As Patterson, Starling, and Samuel corner the lion while it feasts on the body, another lion leaps upon them from the roof of a building, slicing Starling's throat and injuring Patterson's left arm. Patterson recovers and attempts to shoot them, but both lions escape. Samuel says no pair of man-eaters has ever been seen before; they have always been solitary hunters.

The workers, led by a man named Abdullah, turn on Patterson and all progress on the bridge halts. Patterson requests soldiers from England as protection, but is denied. During a brief visit to the site, Beaumont threatens to tarnish Patterson's reputation if Beaumont's commission is not concluded on time. He also announces he will contact famed hunter Charles Remington to help Patterson eliminate the threat, due to Patterson's past failures.

A short time later, Remington arrives at Tsavo with skilled Maasai warriors, who dub the lions "the Ghost" and "the Darkness" due to their notorious methods. Remington's initial attempt to trap one lion in a thicket fails when Patterson's borrowed gun misfires. Daunted, the warriors decide to leave, but Remington stays behind. He builds a new hospital tent for sick and injured workers and tempts the lions to the abandoned building with animal parts and blood. The man-eaters seemingly fall for the trap, but Remington and Patterson shoot at them, and they retreat to the new hospital, slaughtering many patients and Hawthorne.

Abdullah and the workers depart, leaving Patterson, Remington, and Samuel alone. The first two locate the animals' lair and discover the bones of dozens of victims, leading Remington to realize that the lions have been hunting for sport. Back at camp that evening, Patterson mounts a hunting stand in a clearing and lures one of the predators to his position using a baboon as bait. The plan goes awry when Patterson falls from the stand, but Remington slays the lion before it can leap on Patterson. He, Patterson, and Samuel spend the rest of the night drinking and celebrating, but the next morning, Patterson wakes to find the remaining lion devoured Remington while he and Samuel slept.

The two men cremate Remington's remains and burn the tall grass around the camp, driving the surviving lion toward the trap they set there. It ambushes them on the partially constructed bridge and, after a lengthy chase, Patterson finally dispatches it with a double-barreled rifle Samuel has thrown to him from a nearby tree. Abdullah and the workers return and complete the bridge on time. Patterson reunites with Helena and meets their son for the first time.

== Cast ==
- Michael Douglas as Charles Remington
- Val Kilmer as Lt. Colonel John Henry Patterson
- John Kani as Samuel
- Bernard Hill as David Hawthorne
- Tom Wilkinson as Sir Robert Beaumont
- Emily Mortimer as Helena Patterson
- Om Puri as Abdullah
- Henry Cele as Mahina
- Brian McCardie as Angus Starling

== Production ==
The film is based upon The Man-eaters of Tsavo by Lieutenant Colonel John Henry Patterson, the man who actually killed both real lions.

=== Screenplay ===
William Goldman first heard about the story when travelling in Africa in 1984, and thought it would make a good script. In 1989, he pitched the story to Paramount as a cross between Lawrence of Arabia and Jaws, and they commissioned him to write a screenplay which he delivered in 1990.

"My particular feeling is that they were evil", said Goldman of the lions. "I believe that for nine months, evil popped out of the ground at Tsavo."

The script fictionalizes Patterson's account, introducing an American big-game hunter called Charles Remington. The character was based on Anglo-Indian big-game hunter Charles H. Ryall, superintendent of the Railway Police. In original drafts, the character was called Redbeard, and Goldman says his purpose in the story was to create an imposing character who could be killed by the lions and make Patterson seem more brave; Goldman says his ideal casting for the role would have been Burt Lancaster.

According to Goldman, Kevin Costner expressed interest in playing Patterson, but Paramount wanted to use Tom Cruise who ultimately declined. Work on the film slowed until Michael Douglas moved his producing unit with partner Steven Reuther, Constellation Films, to Paramount. Douglas read the script and loved it, calling it "an incredible thriller about events that actually took place." Douglas decided to produce and Stephen Hopkins was hired to direct.

Val Kilmer, who had just made Batman Forever and was a frequent visitor to Africa, then expressed enthusiasm for the script, which enabled the project to be financed.

The part of Remington was originally offered to Sean Connery and Anthony Hopkins but both declined; the producers were considering asking Gérard Depardieu when Douglas decided to play the role himself. Stephen Hopkins later said he was unhappy about this.

In early drafts of the script, Remington was originally going to be an enigmatic figure but when Douglas chose to play him, the character's role was expanded and was given a history. In Goldman's book Which Lie Did I Tell?, the screenwriter argues that Douglas' decision ruined the mystery of the character, making him a "wimp" and a "loser".

=== Locations ===
The film was shot mainly on location at Songimvelo Game Reserve in South Africa, rather than Kenya, due to tax laws. Many Maasai characters in the film were actually portrayed by South African actors, although the Maasai depicted during the hunt were portrayed by real Maasai warriors who were hired for the movie.

=== Filming ===
While the real man-eaters were, like all lions from the Tsavo region, a more aggressive, maneless variety, those used for filming were actually the least aggressive available, for both safety and aesthetic reasons. Paramount's cinematic lions were two male African lions with manes. They were mostly performed by Caesar and Bongo of Clarington, Ontario, Canada's Bowmanville Zoo. Caesar and Bongo were also featured in George of the Jungle. This cinematic production featured three other male African lions: two from France and one from the United States.

Director Stephen Hopkins later said of the shoot:

We had snake bites, scorpion bites, tick bite fever, people getting hit by lightning, floods, torrential rains and lightning storms, hippos chasing people through the water, cars getting swept into the water, and several deaths of crew members, including two drownings.... Val came to the set under the worst conditions imaginable. He was completely exhausted from doing The Island of Dr. Moreau; he was dealing with the unfavorable publicity from that set; he was going through a divorce; he barely had time to get his teeth into this role before we started; and he is in nearly every scene in this movie. But I worked him six or seven days a week for four months under really adverse conditions, and he really came through. He had a passion for this film.

== Reception ==
=== Box office ===
During its opening weekend, The Ghost and the Darkness grossed $10.3 million. The film ultimately grossed over $38.6 million domestically, and $75 million worldwide.

=== Critical response ===
The film won the Academy Award for Best Sound Editing (Bruce Stambler) at the 69th Academy Awards. However, Val Kilmer was nominated for the Razzie Award for Worst Supporting Actor along with The Island of Dr. Moreau at the 17th Golden Raspberry Awards. Reviews were mixed, with Rotten Tomatoes giving it a 51% rating based on 51 reviews. The site's consensus states: "The Ghost and the Darkness hits its target as a suspenseful adventure, but it falls into a trap of its own making whenever it reaches for supernatural profundity." Metacritic, which uses a weighted average, assigned the film a score of 46 out of 100, based on 26 critics, indicating "mixed or average reviews". Audiences polled by CinemaScore gave the film an average grade of "B+" on an A+ to F scale.

Roger Ebert said the film was so awful it "lacked the usual charm of being so bad it's funny" adding it was "an African adventure that makes the Tarzan movies look subtle and realistic". Ebert put the film on his list of the worst movies of 1996. Conversely, David R. Ellis listed this film at #8 on his "Top 10 Animal Horror Movies" countdown, a list he made to promote the release of Shark Night 3D in 2011.

Hopkins said in a 1998 interview that the film "was a mess... I haven't been able to watch it."

== Home media ==
The Ghost and the Darkness was released by Paramount Home Video on DVD on December 1, 1998.

On May 10, 2022, Shout! Factory issued The Ghost and the Darkness on Blu-Ray in a new 4K scan.

== Historical accuracy ==
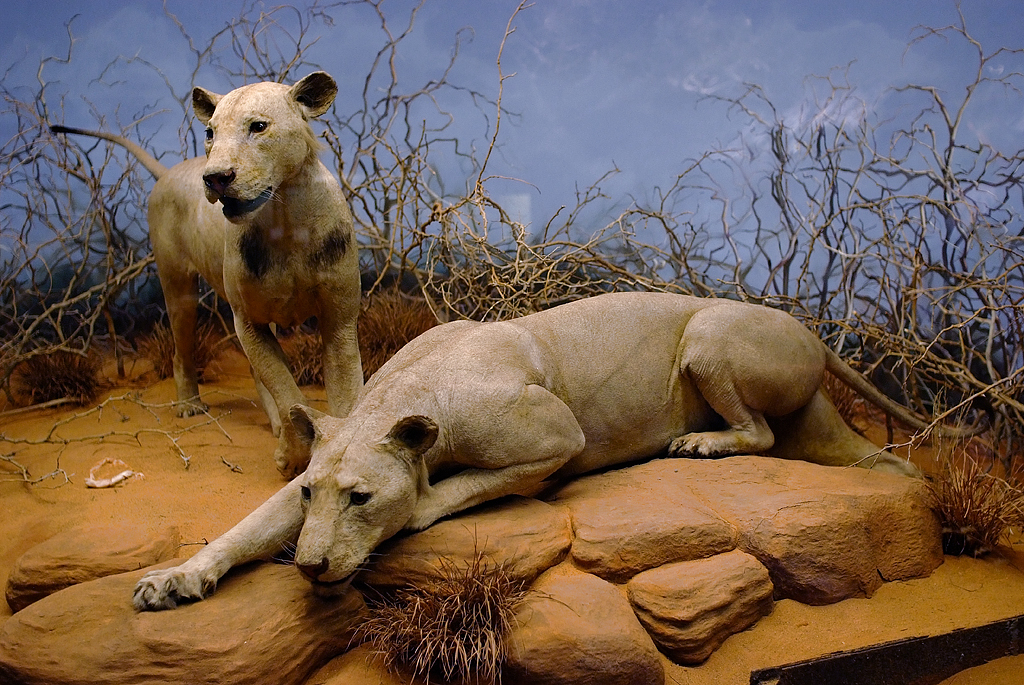
The Tsavo Man-Eaters on display in the Field Museum of Natural History in Chicago.

Although Patterson claimed the lions were responsible for up to 135 deaths, a peer-reviewed paper on man-eating lions and the circumstances surrounding this notorious event states that about 28–31 killings can be verified (Kerbis Peterhans & Gnoske, 2001). However, data from the lions' bones does not rule out that the total combined number of deaths could be as high as 72, an important caveat given that Patterson's journal only counted Indian workers, while the exact numbers of the deaths among native African workers were not documented.

Patterson's 1907 book itself states that the lions "had devoured between them no less than twenty-eight Indian coolies" and "scores of unfortunate African natives of whom no official record was kept." This lesser number of 28 was confirmed in the definitive paper on man-eating behavior and the Tsavo lions by Kerbis Peterhans and Gnoske (2001) and soon thereafter in Dr. Bruce Patterson's definitive book The Lions of Tsavo: Exploring the Legacy of Africa's Notorious Man-Eaters published by McGraw-Hill in 2004. Kerbis Peterhans & Gnoske showed that the greater toll attributed to the lions resulted from a pamphlet written by Col. Patterson in 1925, stating "these two ferocious brutes killed and devoured, under the most appalling circumstances, 135 Indian and African artisans and laborers employed in the construction of the Uganda Railway."

== See also ==
- Bwana Devil (1952)
- The Man-eaters of Tsavo, by J. H. Patterson
- Prey (2007), a South African thriller film
- Rogue (2020), an American action thriller film
- Beast (2022), a survival action horror film
- The Edge (1997), a survival thriller film

== Bibliography ==
- Goldman, William (2000). Which Lie Did I Tell?. Bloomsbury. ISBN 9780747549772.
