= Bwana Devil =

1952 film by Arch Oboler

- Theatrical release poster
- Directed by: Arch Oboler
- Written by: Arch Oboler
- Produced by: Arch Oboler; Sidney W. Pink
- Starring: Robert Stack; Barbara Britton; Nigel Bruce
- Cinematography: Joseph F. Biroc; William D. Snyder
- Edited by: John Hoffman
- Music by: Gordon Jenkins
- Production companies: Gulu Productions; Arch Oboler Productions
- Distributed by: United Artists
- Release date: November 26, 1952
- Running time: 79 minutes
- Country: United States
- Language: English
- Budget: $323,000
- Box office: $5 million

Bwana Devil is a 1952 American adventure film written, produced and directed by Arch Oboler and starring Robert Stack, Barbara Britton and Nigel Bruce. The film dramatizes the true story of the Tsavo maneaters and was filmed with the Natural Vision 3D system. The film is notable for sparking the first 3D film craze in the American film industry. It is the first feature-length 3D film in color and the first 3D sound feature in English.

== Plot ==
In British East Africa in the early 20th century, thousands of workers are building the Uganda Railway, Africa's first railroad, and intense heat and sickness make the project a formidable task. Bob Hayward and Dr. Angus McLean lead the mission. A pair of man-eating lions are on the loose and completely disrupt the undertaking. Hayward desperately attempts to overcome the situation, but the slaughter continues.

Britain sends three big-game hunters to kill the lions, and Bob's wife also arrives. After the hunters are killed by the lions, Bob resolves to kill the lions himself. A grim battle endangers Bob and his wife, but Bob kills the lions.

== Cast ==
- Robert Stack as Bob Hayward
- Barbara Britton as Alice Hayward
- Nigel Bruce as Dr. Angus McLean
- Ramsay Hill as Major Parkhurst
- Paul McVey as Commissioner
- Hope Miller as Portuguese Girl
- John Dodsworth as Sir William Drayton
- Patrick O'Moore as Ballinger
- Pat Aherne as Latham
- Edward C. Short
- Bhogwan Singh as Indian Headman
- Paul Thompson
- Bhupesh Guha as Dancer
- Bal Seirgakar as Indian Hunter
- Kalu K. Sonkar as Karparim
- Miles Clark Jr as Mukosi

== Production ==
The film's plot is based on the Tsavo Man-Eaters, a pair of lions who killed workers building the Uganda Railway. The incidents were also the basis for the book The Man-eaters of Tsavo (1907), the story of the events as written by Lt. Col. J. H. Patterson, the British engineer who killed the animals. The story was also the basis for the film The Ghost and the Darkness (1996) with Michael Douglas and Val Kilmer.

By 1951, film attendance had fallen dramatically from 90 million in 1948 to 46 million, largely the result of the advent of television. Cinerama successfully premiered in September 1952, but its bulky and expensive three-projector system and huge curved screen were impossible to duplicate in any but the largest theaters.

Former screenwriter Milton Gunzburg and his brother Julian promoted their Natural Vision 3D film process, shopping it to various Hollywood studios. However, Twentieth Century-Fox was focusing on the introduction of CinemaScope and had no interest in another new process, and Columbia Pictures and Paramount Pictures also declined. John Arnold, who headed the Metro-Goldwyn-Mayer camera department, was impressed enough to convince MGM to purchase an option on the process, but the studio allowed the option to lapse. Gunzburg turned his focus to independent producers and demonstrated Natural Vision to Arch Oboler, producer and writer of the popular Lights Out radio show. Oboler was impressed enough to option it for his next film project.

Oboler announced the project, titled The Lions of Gulu, in March 1952. He intended to include footage shot in Africa several years earlier. Filming was to begin May in the Natural Vision process. Howard Duff and Hope Miller were the first stars signed, but they both withdrew and were replaced by Robert Stack and Barbara Britton. The title was changed to Bwana Devil in June 1952.

Oboler began production funded by his own bankroll of $10,000. He shot more than a third of the film before receiving any financial backers, and by the time that the film was completed, he had provided approximately half of the budget with his own money.

The film was shot in the San Fernando Valley, and the Paramount Ranch was the setting for an African savanna. A hiking trail in the area named the Bwana Trail identifies the film's shooting locations. Authentic African footage shot by Oboler in 1948 in 2D was incorporated into the film. Ansco Color film was employed rather than the more expensive and cumbersome Technicolor process.

Lloyd Nolan appears in a prologue for the film.

The film was granted Production Code approval in its 2D format, but a kissing scene initially prevented approval for the 3D version.

== Release ==
The film premiered on November 26, 1952 with a twin engagement at the Hollywood Paramount Theatre and the Paramount Theatre in downtown Los Angeles. It opened to the public the following day.

As with all American screenings of feature-length 3D films in the 1950s, the polarized light method was employed and the audience wore 3D glasses with gray Polaroid filters. The two-strip Natural Vision projection system required substantial alterations to theater projectors and the fitting of a special non-depolarizing surface on screens.

M.L. Gunzburg Presents 3D, a short film produced by Bob Clampett and featuring Beany and Cecil, was screened preceding the film. Long thought lost, the short rejoined Bwana Devil for screenings at the Egyptian Theater in 2003 and 2006.

United Artists bought the rights to Bwana Devil from Arch Oboler Productions for $500,000 and a share of the profits and began a wide release of the film in March. A lawsuit followed in which producer Edward L. Alperson Jr. claimed that he was part owner of the film after purchasing a share of it for $1,000,000, but the court decided in Oboler's favor.

The other major studios reacted by releasing their own 3D films. Warner Bros. optioned the Natural Vision process for House of Wax, which premiered on April 10, 1953 and was advertised as the first 3D release by a major studio. However, Columbia Pictures had released Man in the Dark two days earlier.

== Reception ==
In a contemporary review for The New York Times, critic Bosley Crowther wrote:

Outside of the novel sensation of seeing movie images appear as though they are being looked at through a large-size stereoscope—an illusion that fluctuates greatly and is crudely and artlessly used—there is little or no stimulation of a pictorial or dramatic sort to be had ... For the most part, this much touted picture ... is clumsy try at an African adventure film, photographed in very poor color in what appear to be the California hills. The story is meagre and hackneyed—downright old-fashioned, in fact; the direction smacks strongly of slap-dash and the acting is nigh absurd. ... [T]he stereoscopic effect is confused, With some figures appearing three-dimensional and others in the same frame appearing flat; some figures appearing with nimbuses—or "ghosts"—along one side and, now and then, all of them flattening onto a straight two-dimensional plane. When foreground figures are walked in front of a process screen, as they are on several occasions, the effect is uneven, too. And, unfortunately, too many instances of foreground figures disintegrating as they leave the frame or being left in visual suspension indicate that the esthetics of three-dimension are still unsolved.

Hollis Alpert of The Saturday Review wrote:

It is the worst movie in my rather faltering memory, and my hangover from it was so painful that I immediately went to see a two-dimensional movie for relief. Part of the hangover was undoubtedly induced by the photography process itself. To get all the wondrous effects of the stereoscopic motion picture one has to wear a pair of polaroid glasses, made—so far as I could determine—from tinted cellophane and cardboard. These keep slipping off, hanging from one ear, or sliding down the nose, all the while setting up extraneous tickling sensations. And once you have them adjusted and begin looking at the movie, you find that the tinted cellophane (or whatever it is) darkens the color of the screen, so that everything seems to be happening in late afternoon on a cloudy day. The people seem to have two faces, one receding behind the other; the screen becomes unaccountably small, as though one is peering in at a scene through a window. Everything keeps getting out of proportion. Nigel Bruce will either loom up before you or look like a puppet. Sometimes there is depth and sometimes there isn't. One thing is certain: it was all horribly unreal."

In a review for Variety, William Brogdon wrote: "[T]he 3-dimension technique seen in 'Bwana Devil' is not yet ready for widespread use. It does show some improvement over the process of 12 or more years back, but still falls in the gimmick class, needing further technical advances before being suitable for general use."

The film grossed $154,000 in its first two weeks at the Paramount theaters in Los Angeles where it had premiered, setting house records. It earned $2.7 million in theatrical rentals in the U.S. and Canada in 1953. United Artists recorded an overall loss of $200,000 on the film.

== Legacy ==
The audience at the premiere of Bwana Devil, photographed by J. R. Eyerman for Life magazine

Life magazine photographer J. R. Eyerman shot a series of photos of the audience wearing 3D glasses at the film's premiere. One of the photos, published as a full page in the magazine, has become an iconic symbol of the 3D era of the 1950s. It was also shown on the cover of Life, The Second Decade, 1946–1955, a book published in conjunction with an exhibition of Life photographs held at the International Center of Photography. Another of the photos was used as a symbol of alienation under capitalism for the American cover of Guy Debord's book The Society of the Spectacle (1973). The photo used for Debord's book shows the audience in "a virtually trance-like state of absorption, their faces grim, their lips pursed". However, in the photo chosen by Life, "the spectators are laughing, their expressions of hilarity conveying the pleasure of an uproarious, active spectatorship".

In 2006, Bwana Devil was screened in two-strip polarized 3D at the Second World 3D Film Expo at Grauman's Egyptian Theatre in Hollywood.

== Home media ==
The film was never released in VHS or DVD format, but Kino Lorber released it on Blu-ray disc in 2D, 3D and anaglyphic 3D versions on July 30, 2024.
