= The Man-eaters of Tsavo =

1907 book by John Henry Patterson

- Author: John Henry Patterson
- Language: English
- Genre: Non-fiction
- Publisher: Macmillan and Co., Limited
- Publication date: 1907
- Publication place: United Kingdom
- Media type: Print

The Man-eaters of Tsavo is a semi-autobiographical book written by Anglo-Irish military officer and hunter John Henry Patterson. Published in 1907, it recounts his experiences in East Africa while supervising the construction of a railroad bridge over the Tsavo river in Kenya, in 1898. It is titled after a pair of man-eating lions that terrorized the undertaking for nine months until they were shot by Patterson. His recounting of this incident projected him to fame, and it remains the subject of debate to this day. It has also been the basis of numerous films, the best known being The Ghost and the Darkness (1996), starring Val Kilmer and Michael Douglas.

== Overview ==
Following the death of the lions, the book tells of the bridge's completion in spite of additional challenges (such as a fierce flood) as well as many stories concerning local wildlife (including other lions) local tribes, the discovery of the maneaters' cave and various hunting expeditions.

An appendix contains advice to sportsmen visiting British East Africa. The book also includes photographs taken by Patterson at the time which include the railway construction; the workers; local tribes; scenery and wildlife; and the man-eaters.

Several publications about and studies of the man-eating lions of Tsavo have been inspired by Patterson's account. The book has been adapted to film three times: a monochrome, British film of the 1950s, a 1952 3-D film titled Bwana Devil, and a 1996 color version called The Ghost and the Darkness, where Val Kilmer played the daring engineer who hunts down the lions of Tsavo.

== Historicity of the account of the man-eaters ==
The Victorian style of the prose may appear today as overwritten; however, the editor's note to the 1986 reprint claims that the facts suggest that some aspects were actually downplayed, such as the death of Captain Arthur Joseph Haslam, a friend of Patterson's, about which more grisly facts are known. The book describes attacks by two man-eating lions on workers building the Uganda Railway through British East Africa in 1898 and how the pair were eventually killed by Patterson. It was remarkable that 135 people were killed by the man-eaters in less than a year before Patterson managed to kill them (although this number is contested, it is not disproven).

Patterson's 1907 book itself states that "between them [the lions] no less than 28 Indian coolies, in addition to scores of unfortunate African natives of whom no official record was kept" were killed. Later accounts exaggerated this number: 135 'Indian and African artisans and labourers' (Patterson, 1925), '135 armed men' (Patterson & Neiburger, 2000) and 140 (Caputo, 2000). In 2001, Julian Kerbis Peterhans and Tom Gnoske published their definitive paper on man-eating behavior among lions with special reference to the Tsavo situation. They documented between 28 and 31 victims. This lesser number was confirmed in Dr. Bruce Patterson's definitive book The Lions of Tsavo: Exploring the Legacy of Africa's Notorious Man-Eaters. He showed that the greater toll attributed to the lions resulted from a pamphlet written by Colonel Patterson in 1925, stating "these two ferocious brutes killed and devoured, under the most appalling circumstances, 135 Indian and African artisans and laborers employed in the construction of the Uganda Railway."

The skins of the lions may be found at the Field Museum of Natural History in Chicago.

== Setting ==
The book is set in East Africa. The nearest large city to the man-eater attacks is Mombasa, the largest city then and second largest city now in Kenya. The Tsavo man-eater attacks occurred while working on the Uganda Railway. The railway reached Lake Victoria at Port Florence, now Kisumu, which at that time was in Uganda territory. It was separate from railway developments elsewhere in East Africa, for instance in German-run Tanganyika.

The railway project was controversial and the British Press referred to it as "The Lunatic Express", as critics considered it a waste of funds, while supporters argued it was necessary for transportation of goods and suppression of slavery.
