= Maneless lion =

Male lions with a gene polymorphism

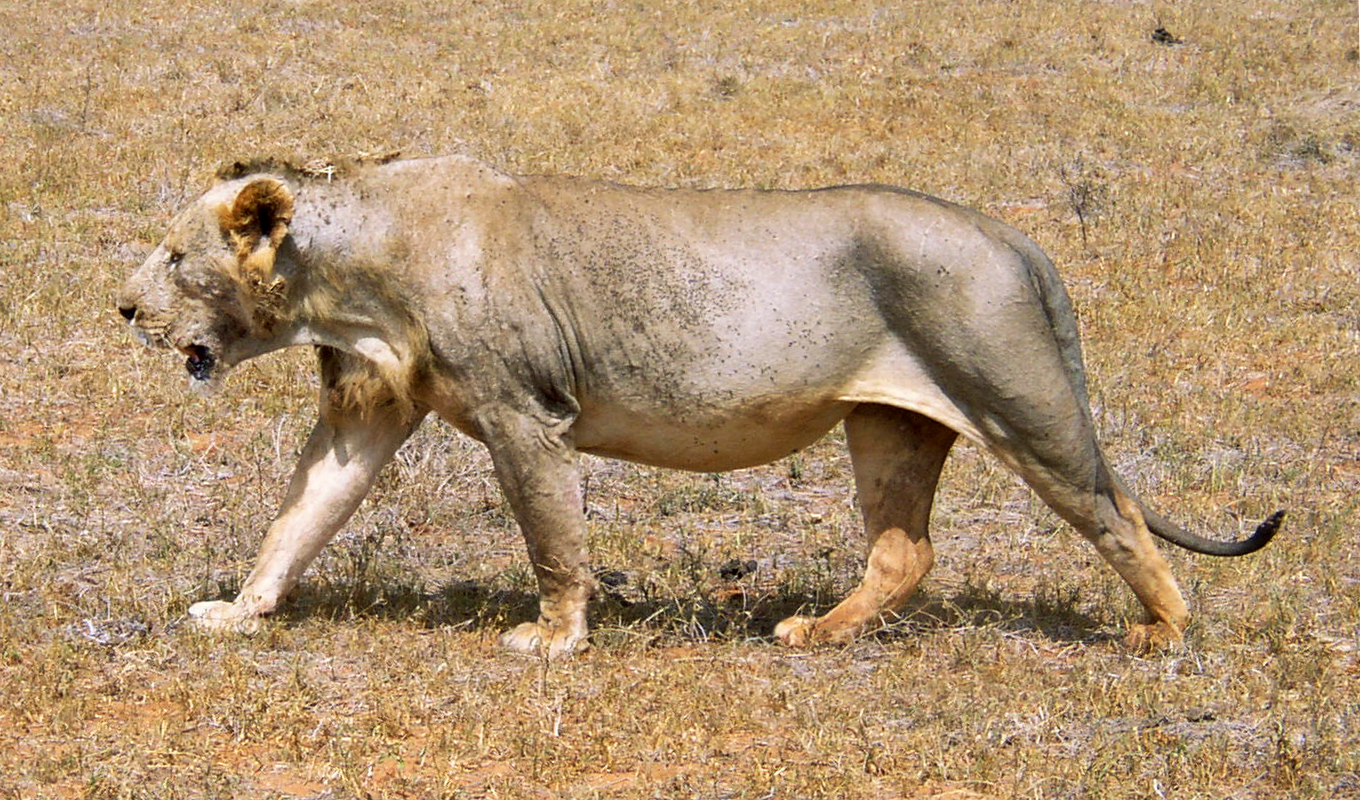
Maneless male lion from Tsavo East National Park, Kenya, East Africa

The term "maneless lion" or "scanty mane lion" often refers to a male lion without a mane, or with a weak one.

The purpose of the mane is thought to signal the fitness of males to females. Experts disagree as to whether or not the mane defends the male lion's throat in confrontations.

Although lions are known for their mane, not all males have one. This might be because of a polymorphism within males.

== Modern lions ==
=== In Eurasia ===
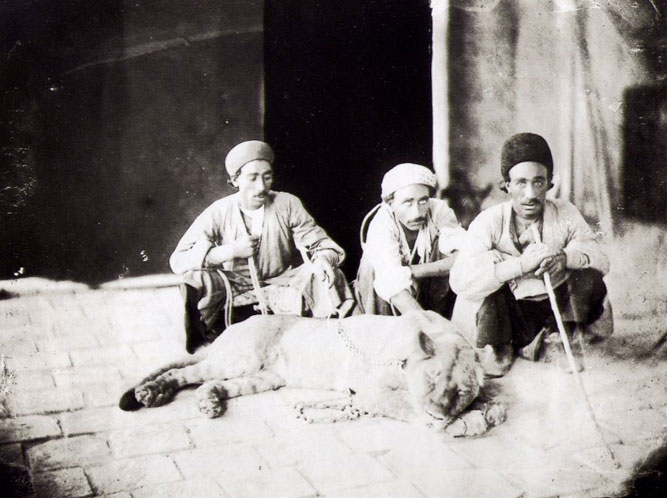
Men with a restrained Asiatic lion in Iran, 1880.

The Asiatic lion is often considered to have a weak mane due to the hot climate of Asia. The manes of most lions in ancient Greece and Asia Minor were also less developed and did not extend to below the belly, sides or ulnas. Lions in Mesopotamia had hair on the underbelly, unlike modern lions in India. A relief from Nineveh in the Mesopotamian Plain shows a lion with underbelly hair. Lions with such smaller manes were also known in the Syrian region, Arabian Peninsula and Egypt.

=== In Africa ===
In West Africa, lions with weak manes or none are often seen.

Lions in ancient Egyptian art are usually depicted without a mane, but with a ruff around the neck. The reason for this is not known.

== Cave lions ==
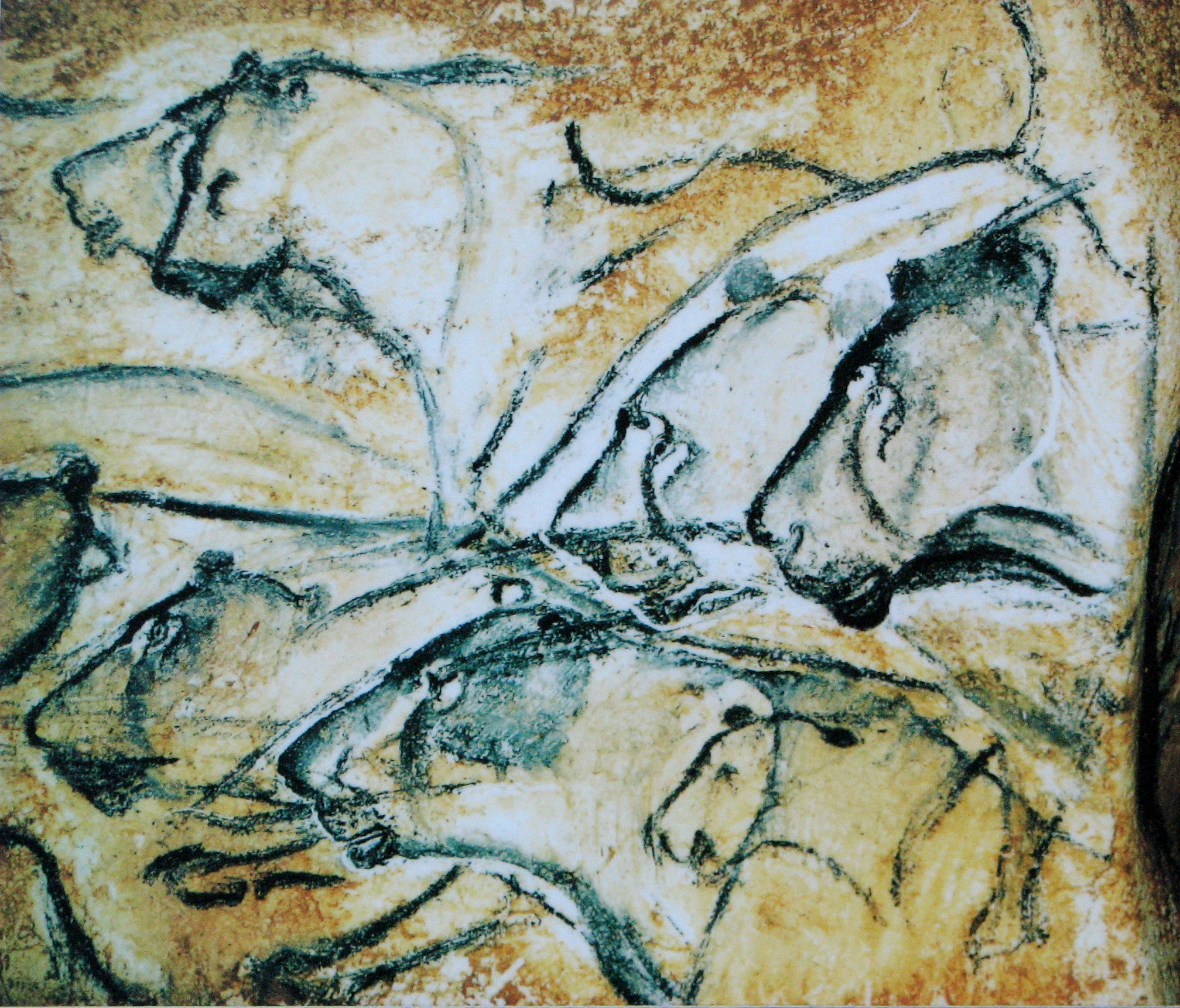
Upper Paleolithic cave painting in the Chauvet Cave, France

Paleolithic European cave paintings depict all cave lions (which are a distinct species most closely related to the modern lion) without manes, even if they display clear male characteristics such as the presence of a scrotum, suggesting that manes were absent in this species.

== See also ==
- White lion
- Panthera leo leo
- Panthera leo melanochaita
