= Milton Gunzburg =

American screenwriter

Milton Lowell Gunzburg (1910 – April 6, 1991) was an American journalist and screenwriter. Gunzburg developed the Natural Vision stereoscopic 3-D system.

== Career ==
After pursuing his education at UCLA and Columbia University, Gunzburg became a Hollywood scriptwriter at Metro-Goldwyn-Mayer Studio in the 1940s before abandoning the business to focus on the development of 3D filming in the 1950s. While watching footage of home movies which he had filmed in 3D, he was inspired to pursue the development of a new 3D technique for the film industry. Along with his brother Julian, a Beverly Hills ophthalmologist, and cinematographer Friend Baker, he developed the Natural Vision 3D film system in 1951, attracting the attentions of Arch Oboler who used it in his film Bwana Devil. Although the film was a critical disaster, it was an enormous commercial success. Natural Vision was then used to film House of Wax with Vincent Price and The Charge at Feather River. In 1972 Gunzburg sued Warner Bros. regarding both films claiming that he had not been paid according to his contract. The success of Natural Vision led to a lucrative contract with Polaroid wherein Gunzburg maintained exclusive rights for a year to sell the special glasses required to view the 3D films.

== Personal life ==
Gunzburg died of cancer in Beverly Hills, California in 1991.
