= White hunter (disambiguation) =

White hunter (sometimes great white hunter) is a term for professional big-game hunters of European descent who plied their trade in Africa, especially during the first half of the 20th century.

The term may also refer to:

- The Great White Hunter, the title by which the 1947 American film The Macomber Affair was re-released in 1952
- White Hunter, a 1938 book by J. A. Hunter about African safaris
- White Hunter (film), a 1936 American film about a safari guide
- White Hunter (TV series), 1957 British television series, based on the above noted book by J. A. Hunter
- "White Hunter" (As Time Goes By), a 1993 television episode
- White Hunter Black Heart, a 1990 American film about the making of a film in the early 1950s in Africa
