= .400 Purdey =

Centerfire rifle cartridge

- Type: Rifle
- Place of origin: United Kingdom

Production history
- Designer: James Purdey & Sons
- Designed: 1905
- Produced: 1905–present

Specifications
- Case type: Rimmed, straight
- Bullet diameter: .405 in (10.3 mm)
- Neck diameter: .427 in (10.8 mm)
- Base diameter: .469 in (11.9 mm)
- Rim diameter: .516 in (13.1 mm)
- Case length: 3 in (76 mm)
- Overall length: 3.6 in (91 mm)

Ballistic performance
Bullet mass/type	Velocity	Energy
230 gr (15 g)	2,050 ft/s (620 m/s)	2,150 ft⋅lbf (2,920 J)
- Test barrel length: 26.5; Sources: Barnes & Kynoch.

The .400 Purdey, also known as the .400 3-inch Straight and .400 Purdey Light Express 3-inch, is an obsolete rifle cartridge developed by James Purdey & Sons.

== Design ==
The .400 Purdey is a rimmed straight walled centerfire rifle cartridge intended for use in single shot and double rifles. It fires a bullet of .405 inches (10.3 mm) diameter weighing 230 grains (15 g), driven by 47 grains (3.0 g) of cordite, at a listed speed of 2,050 feet per second (620 m/s).

== History ==
In Britain, from the inception of breech-loading rifles there were a large number of straight black powder .40 in (10 mm) paper and coiled brass cartridges developed of varying case lengths from 2 to 3 1/4 inches. Around 1905, Purdey loaded the 3 inch brass cartridge with a light cordite load to create this cartridge. Unusually for a proprietary cartridge, the .400 Purdey was introduced as a "Nitro for Black" loading, typically a mild loading of smokeless powder for a Black Powder Express cartridge, carefully balanced through trial to replicate the ballistics of the black powder version.

In 1899 John Rigby & Company shortened the black powder predecessor of the .400 Purdey to 2.75 inches (70 mm) and necked it down to .358 inches (9.1 mm) to create the .400/350 Nitro Express which in turn later became the .350 Rigby No 2.

== Use ==
The .400 Purdey was reasonably popular in India for deer, boar and even tiger, and was available in both double rifles and more reasonably priced Martini action sporting rifles. Whilst obsolete, cartridges can still be purchased today from manufacturers such as Kynoch.

== See also ==
- List of rifle cartridges
- 10 mm rifle cartridges
