= Ikimizi =

Ikimizi can refer to:

- Nandi bear
- Marozi
