= John Rigby & Company =

Irish gunmaking firm

- Industry: Firearms
- Founded: 1775; 251 years ago Dublin, Ireland
- Founder: John Rigby
- Headquarters: United Kingdom
- Area served: Worldwide
- Products: Rifles, Shotguns
- Services: Engraving
- Owner: Lüke & Ortmeier Gruppe
- Website: http://www.johnrigbyandco.com/

John Rigby & Company (or John Rigby & Co. (Gunmakers) Ltd) is a gunmaking firm founded by John Rigby in 1775 in Dublin. The company was established by the first John Rigby in Dublin, Ireland, apparently in 1775; his grandson, also John, opened a London branch in 1865; and Dublin operations had ceased by February 1897. The company is now owned by Lüke & Ortmeier Gruppe and is based in Vauxhall, central London, under the supervision of managing director Marc Newton.

John Rigby & Co. builds rifles based on Mauser barrelled actions and double rifles based on its Rigby-Bissell 1879 patent rising-bite action. Rigby also offers a serial-number research service, refurbishes vintage Rigbys for owners and collectors around the world, and maintains a Rigby collection in its showroom.

== Company history ==
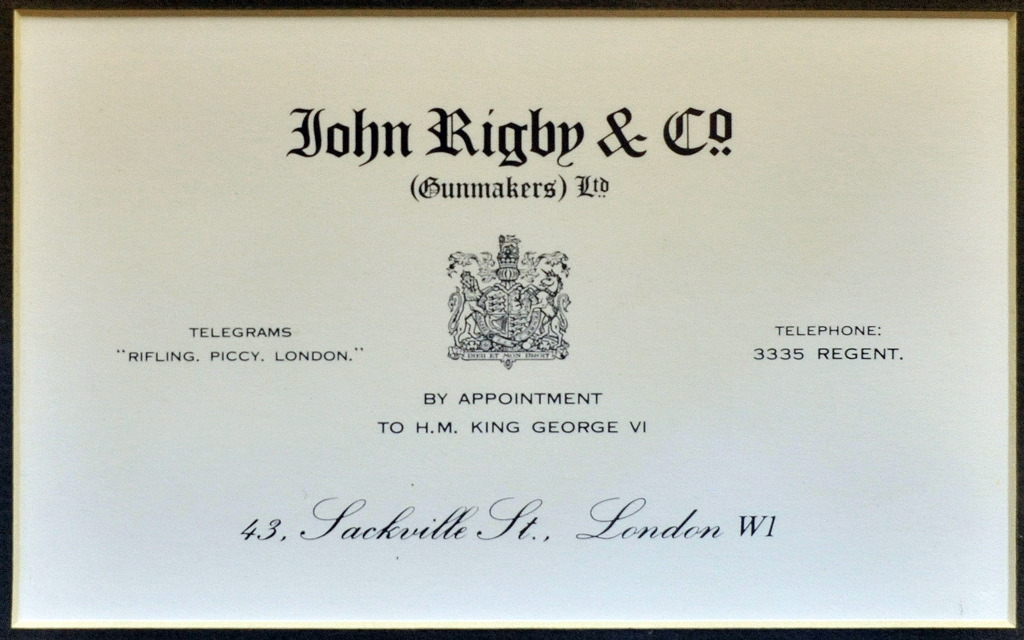
Rigby label from the early 1900s

Some documents suggest the firm was established in 1735. However, since the first John Rigby was born in 1758 in Dublin and entered the gunmaking trade there in 1775, Rigby today claims that as its founding date. (If John Rigby took over another gunmaking house, he would have inherited its founding date, in which case 1735 could be valid.) The surviving business ledgers date from 1781 and show that by then John Rigby was making, under his own name, shotguns, rifles, muskets, spring guns, carbines, blunderbusses, and pistols to clients' specifications and a wide range of prices.

Rigby was nearly bankrupted during the Irish Rebellion of 1798 when the government seized the arms from his premises, those belonging to the firm and its clients, presumably to keep them out of the rebels' hands. However, by 1810 (if not sooner), John Rigby had rebuilt his business and, in addition to sporting guns, was making, updating, and repairing thousands of guns for Ireland's police, military, postal, and customs services.

After John Rigby died in 1818, his sons William and John Jason Rigby operated the business as W. & J. Rigby from c. 1820 to 1865, a period that spanned flintlock, percussion, pinfire, and needlefire ignition and marked the start of the modern metallic cartridge era. Rigby was a leader in barrel-making and rifling technology and, at the time, was also recognised for its high-grade duelling pistols. (Irish gentlemen especially had a fondness for calling each other out over perceived slights to their honour.)

The third John Rigby, born in 1829 in Dublin and educated in science at Trinity College, took over in 1858, when his father, William, died. It was this John Rigby who brought the firm to international prominence. In 1865, capitalising on the awards his family's guns had earned at the Great Exhibition in London in 1851 and at the Paris Exhibition of 1855, in 1865 John Rigby opened a store at 72 St James's Street in London's West End. Sometime in the 1890s, Rigby sold his Dublin operations to Trulock & Harriss (keeping, however, his customers in Ireland) and became a bona fide member of the small circle of elite gunmakers who catered for London society.

Like his grandfather, the third John Rigby was a top target shooter and developed the Rigby Target Rifle for competition use. He won several Wimbledon Cups (the premier long-range rifle championship in the United Kingdom) and, for 28 years, he helped form the Irish national shooting team. Rigby also won the Abercorn Cup and the first Gordon Bennett Cup, and was Irish Champion three times. Between circa 1860 and 1875, the Rigby .451-calibre muzzleloader was the match rifle of choice throughout the United Kingdom. In October 1874, one such rifle was presented to Lt. Col. George A. Custer: the Irish team had dined with him, and President and Mrs. Ulysses S. Grant, in Chicago. The Irish were on an American tour following the first International Rifle Match at the Creedmoor Range in New York. There, John Rigby had posted the highest individual scores among all competitors.

During the period from the Crimean War to the First World War, every facet of firearms and ammunition underwent radical change, and thousands of related patents were filed in Britain, the United States, and Europe. The areas of greatest interest were military rifles (a matter of grave national importance) and, because of their prestige, top-shelf sporting guns. John Rigby & Co. was deeply involved in creating guns and cartridges for both markets. Because of his expertise, the British government appointed John Rigby superintendent of the Royal Small Arms Factory at Enfield Lock in 1887. There, Rigby and his large staff resolved design and production problems for a new rifle and its cartridge: the .303-calibre Lee Enfield, which in various forms went on to serve as the principal battle rifle for the United Kingdom until 1957.

By government policy, at the age of 65, in 1894, John Rigby retired from government service. He returned to the family firm with the latest knowledge on repeating rifles, smokeless powder, metallurgy, rifling, and bullet design, as well as international contacts at the highest levels of gunmaking. One of these was Peter Paul Mauser, and in 1898, Rigby was appointed the exclusive importer and distributor of Mauser rifles and components for the British Empire. Rigby also developed sporting versions of the Mauser-action rifle, sold under their trade name as the "Rigby-Mauser" system; they also repackaged ammunition and sold it under their own name, such as the 7x57 Mauser, which they called the .275 bore, a highly successful stalking cartridge at the time.

In 1912, John Rigby & Co. lost the exclusive British sales contract to a member of the Mauser family, but Rigby continued to base its magazine rifles on Mauser (and Mauser-style) actions, a practice it still follows today. Among professional and sporting hunters in India and Africa, Rigby became known as the 'aristocrat of bolt-action rifles'.

Rigby developed a successful medium-heavy game round known as the .350 Rigby, and its rimmed counterpart for double rifles, the .350 No. 2. Rigby also invented the .416 Rigby cartridge.

Although some modern gun writers have credited Rigby with inventing or promoting the 7x57 as the ".275 Rigby" cartridge, this is untrue. There was no such cartridge name at the time, and it is a modern misunderstanding of Rigby marketing of the period, which called their rifles "Rigby-Mausers." Throughout the British Empire, the 7x57 cartridge was commonly known as the .275 (or .276), and there was no association with Rigby itself, which never marketed any proprietary cartridge by that name nor stamped a rifle with that chambering. Despite this, the .275 Rigby name has caught on, and special brass headstamps and custom rifles marked ".275 Rigby" have become desirable, despite having no historical basis. (Rigby did sell repackaged German-made 7x57 ammunition under their own name in the early 20th century, but it was marked .275 Bore, as were their rifles.)

At John Rigby's request, in 1900, Mauser began to develop a stretched version of its G98 action for larger cartridges. This became known as the Magnum Mauser and has served as the foundation for countless bolt-action big-game rifles ever since. The larger action was originally meant for Rigby's interim .400/.350 round, but in 1911 the company introduced the .416 Rigby cartridge for rifles built on the Magnum Mauser action. This was the first magazine rifle that could perform on a par with the powerful Nitro-Express double rifles at one-third to one-fifth of their price.

John Rigby was well-versed in Nitro Express cartridges. In 1898, with the help of the Curtis's & Harvey Gunpowder Company, he introduced the first of them: the Rigby .450 NE. In 1899, however, the colonial government of India began to restrict .450-calibre rifles and ammunition, which forced British gunmakers to develop a flood of variations to avoid the India ban. The most popular of these proved to be the .470 Nitro Express, and John Rigby & Co. adopted this as its 'standard' heavy double-rifle load.

In addition to the Nitro Express cartridge, Rigby was noted for the vertical-bolt, or rising-bite, action, used on its double rifles and shotguns. Based on the Rigby-Bissell Patent of 1879, this is a locking system with a post that rises vertically from the break-off into a U-shaped loop extending rearward from the top rib of the barrels, serving as a third fastener. Between 1879 and 1933, Rigby built approximately one thousand rising-bite guns and rifles in many different bores. Within a few weeks after the first new rising-bite action passed London proof, in November 2014, Rigby received orders for more than a dozen such rifles. Following the unveiling of the first completed modern rising-bite in January 2016, Rigby received over 20 further orders for rising-bite shotguns and rifles.

John Rigby died in 1916, leaving a prosperous business in the hands of his son, Theodore. After Theodore Rigby's death in 1951, the company was acquired by Vernon Harriss, a solicitor, businessman, international match rifle shooter, and holder of the Royal Warrant. After Mr Harriss' death in 1965, his widow sold the business in 1968 to a team of investors led by David Marx. Marx contracted with J. Roberts & Son, a London gun company established in 1959, to build Rigby guns. Paul Roberts, Joseph Roberts' son, took over Rigby in 1982 and operated it until 1997. D.H.L. Black's book, Great Irish Gunmakers: Messrs Rigby, 1760-1869, was published in 1992.

In 1997, Paul Roberts sold the Rigby name and other intellectual property to Neil Gibson of Texas, but kept the right to continue building certain Rigby guns and rifles in England, while Gibson began making Rigby firearms in California.

In 2010, two American investors, Jeff Meyer and John Reed, acquired the assets of John Rigby & Co.. They returned the manufacturing to London, J. Roberts & Son, and published the book Rigby: A Grand Tradition. The new owner also settled various trademark disputes and secured the historic Rigby archives.

In 2013, Rigby was sold to L&O Holding, which owns J.P. Sauer & Sohn, SIG Sauer Inc., Blaser, and Mauser, all of which have historic ties to Rigby, including a collaboration prior to World War I on developing the Magnum Mauser action for the Rigby .416 cartridge. L&O repatriated Rigby entirely to London, where it now has an office, showroom, and a factory at 13-19 Pensbury Place, SW8, in London's Vauxhall district.

== Rigby Patents ==
- No. 1976 of 1854 - a lever cartridge rammer for a revolver; a type of rifling; a safety hook for an outside-hammer lock; a means of joining barrels with straps and wedges; etc.
- No. 3140 of 1860 - a trapdoor-type gate to allow barrels to be loaded at their breeches (with J. Needham).
- No. 899 of 1860 - sideways-pivoting barrels; a drop-down revolver barrel; a needlefire cartridge; a cartridge lined with sheet brass; etc. (with William Norman).
- No. 1966 of 1862 (provisional) - a drop-down barrel that also moves horizontally; a breechblock cartridge extractor; a rifle foresight that adjusts for windage as well as range.
- No. 332 of 1867 (provisional) - a rebounding hammer for pistols and single- and double-barrel guns.
- No. 1098 of 1871 - a snap-action locking underlever; sub-gauge barrel liner tubes; etc.
- No. 312 of 1875 (provisional) - a method of choke boring a shotgun barrel (with M. W. Scott).
- No. 1141 of 1879 - 'vertical/horizontal bolting for drop-down guns' (with Thomas Bissell).
- No. 1361 of 1882 - a sidelever falling-block single-shot rifle (with Langrishe Fyers Banks).
- No. 16321 of 1888 - 'bayonets attaching to gun barrels'.
- No. 301 of 1897 - a single-trigger mechanism (with M. A. and L. E. Atkins)
- No. 5554 of 1906 - 'apparatus for teaching correct aiming with a rifle'.

== Cartridges developed by John Rigby & Co. ==
- .450 Nitro Express (1898)
- .275 Rigby (1899)
- .400/.350 Nitro Express (1899)
- .350 Rigby and .350 Rigby No. 2 (1908)
- .416 Rigby (1911)
- .275 No 2 Magnum (1927)
- .450 Rigby (1995)

== Notable clients and users (a partial list) ==
- Edward VII
- Elizabeth II
- George IV
- George V
- George VI
- Franz Joseph II, Prince of Liechtenstein
- Maximillian, Prince of Furstenberg
- W.D.M. 'Karamojo' Bell
- George H. W. Bush
- Sir Winston Churchill
- Jim Corbett
- Lt. Col. George A. Custer
- Denys Finch-Hatton
- John A. Hunter
- Field Marshal Kitchener
- Marshal C. G. E. Mannerheim
- Pete Pearson
- Philip Percival
- Sir Charles Ross, 9th Baronet
- Kermit Roosevelt
- Harry Selby
- Frederick Courney Selous
- Wilbur Smith
- John 'Pondoro' Taylor

Rigby rifles and guns were also popular among the royalty of India and Asia, including Sheikh Abdullah and the Emir of Afghanistan, as well as the nawabs, rajas, maharajas, maharanas, and other rulers of the princely states of Alwar, Berar, Bharatpur, Bhopal, Bijawar, Idar, Jhalawar, Jhind, Jodhpur, Karauli, Kashmir, Khairpur, Kutch, Patiala, Pooch, Rewa, Surguja, Tikari, Udaipur, and Uliver.

== Royal Warrants ==
John Rigby & Co. held a royal appointment to:

- King George IV
- The Prince of Wales (1885)
- King Edward VII
- King George V
- King George VI
- Queen Elizabeth II (Warrant no longer held).
