= W. Robert Foran =

British Army officer, hunter and writer (1881–1968)

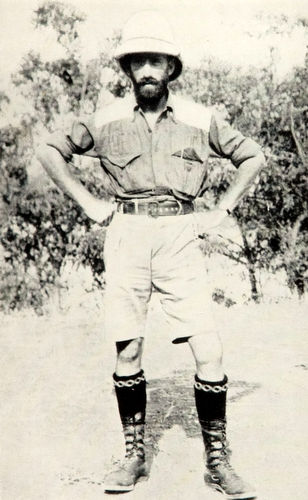
W. Robert Foran at the end of the Roosevelt Expedition.

William Robert Foran (1881–1968) was a British Army officer, big game hunter and travel writer.

== Biography ==
Foran trained at Royal Military College, Sandhurst, and was commissioned into British Army as it was enlarged during the Second Boer War in South Africa. He originally served with the 21st Battalion Imperial Yeomanry, where he was promoted to lieutenant. While in South Africa, he transferred to a regular army regiment as second lieutenant in The Prince Albert's (Somersetshire Light Infantry) on 23 April 1902, and after the end of the war that year left Natal for British India in November 1902. He later achieved the rank of Major. He traveled from Johannesburg to Mombasa, Kenya in 1904, and then to the newly founded city of Nairobi to buy land for farming. While in Nairobi, Foran was recruited by the British East Africa Police, becoming one of its six original officers.

Foran distinguished himself as a big game hunter and wrote numerous articles and books based on his adventures, including Kill or Be Killed: The Rambling Reminiscences of an Amateur Hunter, published in 1933, which includes stories about fellow big game hunters James H. Sutherland, Arthur Henry Neumann, W. D. M. Bell and Chauncey Hugh Stigand. Foran worked as a travel writer for the National Geographic Society and wrote Malayan Symphony: Being The Impressions Gathered During A Six months' Journey Through The Straits Settlements, Federated Malay States, Siam, Sumatra, Java And Bali about his 1935 trip through Southeast Asia. His account of a visit to Tristan da Cunha, the most remote inhabited archipelago in the world, was published in November 1938.

He lived out the last years of his life in Nanyuki, Kenya, and died in 1968.
