= Monkey tail =

A monkey tail is the tail visible on some monkeys.

Monkey tail may also refer to:

- At sign, the symbol "@" also known as a monkey tail or apetail
- Monkey tail plant, the plant Heliotropium curassavicum
- Monkey tail tree, the tree Araucaria araucana
- Monkey's tail, a Chilean drink, Cola de mono
- Monkey's tail, a stopper knot for ropes
- Monkey Tail (Westley Richards), a British rifle

== See also ==
- Monkey's fist, a type of knot
