= Westley Richards =

British manufacturer of guns and rifles

- Type: Private
- Industry: Firearms
- Founded: 1812; 214 years ago
- Founder: William Westley Richards
- Headquarters: 130 Pritchett Street, Birmingham, England, United Kingdom
- Area served: Worldwide
- Products: Double rifles, Bolt-action rifles, Shotguns
- Website: WestleyRichards.com

Westley Richards is a British manufacturer of guns and rifles and also a well established gunsmith. The company was founded in 1812 by William Westley Richards, who was responsible for the early innovation of many rifles used in wars featuring the British Army during the 1800s. It remained in the hands of the Richards family until it was purchased by Walter Clode in 1957. Currently the company has two listed directors, Alexander Clode and Sheikh Sultan Bin Jassim Al Thani of Qatar. The company has received a number of royal warrants since 1840.

Famous gun owners have included Ernest Hemingway, Maharaja of Alwar and actor Stewart Granger. Today, Westley Richards is one of the oldest surviving traditional gun and rifle makers in England. In 2009, the company diversified into a number of other markets, including country clothing.

== History ==
Westley Richards was founded in Birmingham in 1812 by William Westley Richards at the age of 22. His family background had been in fine jewellery, cutlery and the gun trade. Early in the company's history, Richards coined the motto, "to be the maker of as good a gun as can be made", which is still used to this day.

William Westley Richards was an early gun innovator, creating a number of gun-related patents. The two most significant was the patent relating to the use of a new waterproof primer for the ignition of percussion guns and also the first flip-up sight, which went on to be used by the British Army. Richards opened a gun shop in London in 1815 on New Bond Street. The shop was owned and managed by William Bishop, who was known as the 'Bishop of Bond Street'. It was stated in a book published by G. T. Teasdale-Buckell in 1900, that Bishop had served as a lieutenant.

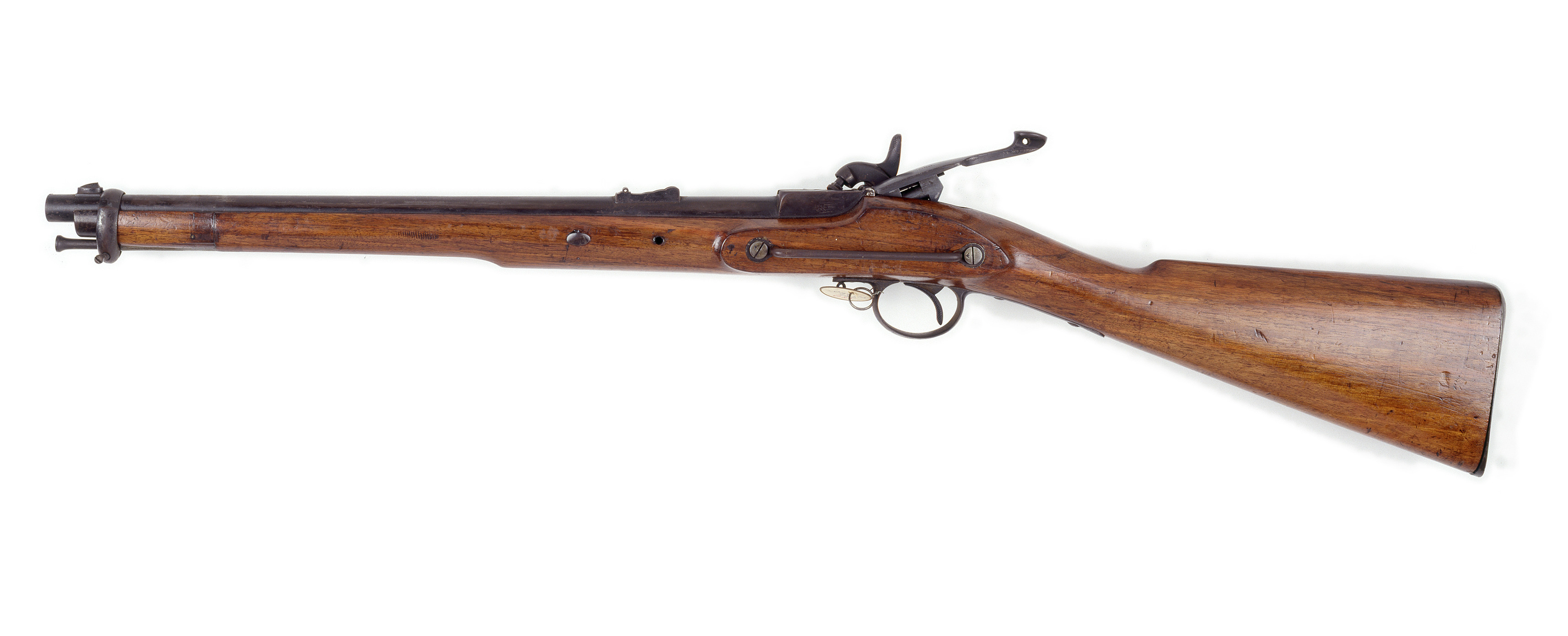
Westley Richards' Cavalry carbine (1865), the 'Monkey Tail'

In 1865, control of the gunsmith company was inherited by Westley Richards, who was the eldest son of the founder. Richards carried on in a similar vein to his father, innovating various guns and registering patents. In 1862, he was responsible for the innovation of the fastening system used on some rifles. His innovations with rifles continued for the next decade, creating the falling block rifle in 1868 and a solid drawn-metallic cartridge case.

John Deeley took over the commercial side of the company, with the aim to expand the business from 1871. These expansions were mainly focused on South Africa and India, both of which were part of the British Empire. Before the Second Boer War, the two Boer republics' most common rifle was the .450 Westley Richards falling-block, single-action, breech-loading rifle, with accuracy up to 600 yards. It was similar to the Martini-Henry Mark II used by British troops. A book about the First Boer War, (J. Lehmann's The First Boer War, 1972), offered this comment: "Employing chiefly the very fine breech-loading Westley Richards - calibre 45; paper cartridge; percussion-cap replaced on the nipple manually - they made it exceedingly dangerous for the British to expose themselves on the skyline". Another popular military arm used by the Boers was the Westley Richards Monkey Tail.

In the decades to come, these expansions proved to be vital to the company's global success.

Following the establishment of the new type of shotgun mechanism, the company's success in manufacturing both military and sporting weapons saw them move to a new base in 1894. The gun factory in Bournbrook was then established and designed by the architect Charles Bateman. Prior to the turn of the century, Leslie B. Taylor took over the operations at Westley Richards & Co. He was responsible for the ongoing improvement of the boxlock action.

In 1898–1903, WR acted as Mauser agents, selling pistols as well as rifles/carbines and their actions to most of the British gun trade.

During the next 50 years and two World Wars, the company survived and pressed their skills into the war efforts. Following World War II, there was a decline in the manufacturing of weapons in general. The war efforts over the past decades had changed the organisation into a producer of military weapons, but due to the end of the war, the demand slowed dramatically. In 1957, Walter Clode purchased the company and was responsible for turning around the fortunes of the company. He purchased the company for £2,000 and then invested a further £12,000 to get it back on its feet. During this period, he moved his focus to the United States. He restored many old weapons used in India, reselling them as vintage restorations at shows around the world, including Las Vegas.

Shortly after the company announced that it would be expanding its operations into the clothing market. The reason behind the move was said to be down to the large close season for shooting in the United Kingdom, which traditionally runs from January through to August. By launching a clothing brand, it allowed the company to capitalise on this slow period.

In 2012, the company celebrated its bicentenary, publishing the book, In Pursuit of the Best Gun, written by Jeremy Musson.

== Notable guns ==
One of the most famous guns was created by John Deeley in the late-1800s. Deeley produced the first boxlock action shotgun, which was a hammerless action of a type commonly used in double barrelled shotguns, dating back to roughly 1875. The boxlock action uses concealed, self-cocking hammers in a break-open action. It was strongly opposed by most sportsmen and manufacturers at first, but became the dominant form of double barrelled shotgun action.

The 12G Westley Richards Droplock is one of the more famous guns produced by the gunsmith. One of the guns is said to be on display at the royal residence, Sandringham House.

=== Customers ===
During the 1920s, Jai Singh Prabhakar, Maharaja of Alwar was the owner of a number of Westley Richards rifles. Around the same period of time, it was reported that Maharaja Bhupinder Singh also possessed a number of Westley Richards rifles; it was reported by The Tribune that Singh's rifle would be sold for an estimated £30,000.

George Eastman notably referred to his Westley Richards guns in his book Chronicles of an African Trip, which was published in 1927. Stewart Granger was also known to own Westleys, including a .577 rifle. It was said that he carried the rifle during the filming of King Solomon's Mines in 1950.

Ernest Hemingway was said to be an owner of numerous Westley Richards guns and rifles. In March 2011 it was announced that one of Hemingway's double rifles has been sold in auction for $295,000. The double rifle was a .577 Nitro Express.

James H. Sutherland, the noted elephant hunter who shot between 1,300 and 1,600 elephants, used a Westley Richards single-trigger Droplock .577 Nitro Express double rifle for most of his hunting, along with a bolt action .318 Westley Richards which he used in open country where the quarry was difficult to approach and long shots were required. Upon his death, Sutherland bequeathed his rifles to his friend Major G.H. Anderson. In 2007, Sutherland's .577 Nitro Express brought £68,000 at auction.

Jim Corbett owned a Westley Richards 275 model as mentioned in The Temple Tiger and More Maneaters of Kumaon.

== Clothing and accessories ==
From 2009 onwards, the company began to focus on branded clothing as well as firearms. They focused on the hunting and shooting communities, stating that professional shooters and social groups would benefit from another luxury clothing brand in this field.

The product range includes bags and suitcases. Since the launch of the clothing and accessory lines, it is said that clothing now accounts for 50% of the company's turnover.

== Royal honours ==
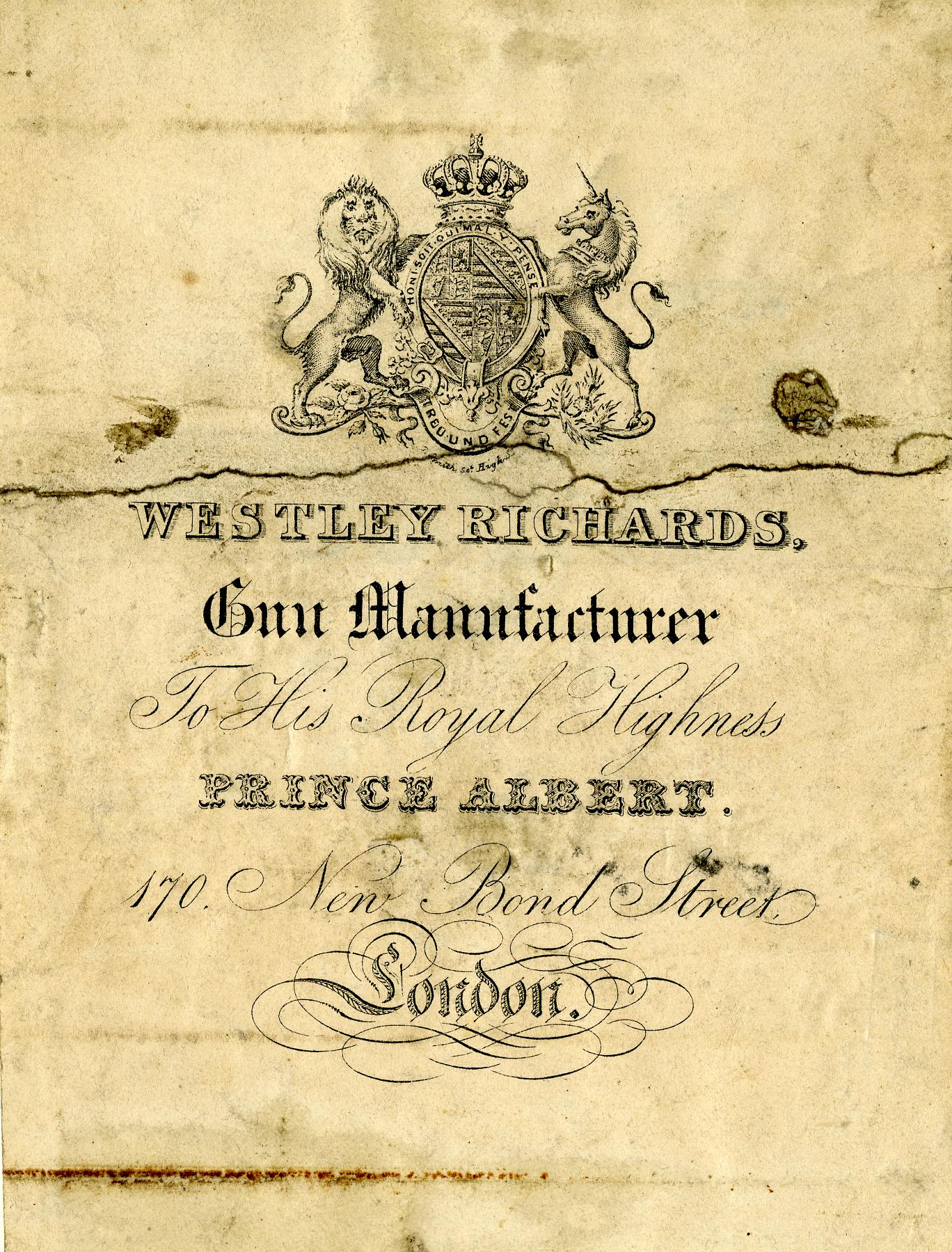
Westley Richards trade card with Prince Albert's royal warrant, c.1840

The company has a number of royal warrants, dating back to their first in 1840. Prince Albert was the issuer of the first warrant received by the company. Other royal warrants were issued by Queen Victoria, King Edward VII and King George V.

The company also received a royal warrant in Persia, from the Shah of Persia and the royal family. The last of the warrants came in 1911, which was presented by King George V.

== See also ==
- Category:Westley Richards cartridges
