= .400/350 Nitro Express =

Rifle cartridge

- Type: Rifle
- Place of origin: United Kingdom

Production history
- Designer: John Rigby & Company
- Designed: 1899
- Produced: 1899–present

Specifications
- Parent case: .400 Purdey
- Case type: Rimmed, bottleneck
- Bullet diameter: .358 in (9.1 mm)
- Neck diameter: .380 in (9.7 mm)
- Shoulder diameter: .415 in (10.5 mm)
- Base diameter: .470 in (11.9 mm)
- Rim diameter: .520 in (13.2 mm)
- Rim thickness: .050 in (1.3 mm)
- Case length: 2.75 in (70 mm)
- Overall length: 3.685 in (93.6 mm)
- Case capacity: 78.1 gr H_{2}O (5.06 cm^{3})

Ballistic performance
Bullet mass/type	Velocity	Energy
310 gr (20 g)	2,000 ft/s (610 m/s)	2,752 ft⋅lbf (3,731 J)
- Test barrel length: 28 in Sources: Barnes & Kynoch.

The .400/350 Nitro Express, also known at the .400/350 Nitro Rigby, is a medium bore rifle cartridge developed by John Rigby & Company.

== Design ==
The .400/350 Nitro Express is a rimmed bottlenecked centerfire cartridge originally designed for use in single-shot, bolt action and double rifles. It fires solid or soft point bullets of .358 inches (9.1 mm) weighing 310 grains (20 g) at 2,000 feet per second (610 m/s).

== History ==
The .400/350 Nitro Express was developed by John Rigby & Co by necking down the .400 Purdey and was introduced in 1899. That same year Rigby approached the engineers at Mauser to make a special Gewehr 98 bolt action to handle this cartridge, its introduction in 1900 was the birth of the magnum length bolt action, paving the way for such cartridges as the .375 H&H and .416 Rigby. The magazines of these early magnum length Rigby mauser rifles were slanted to accommodate these rimmed cartridges.

At one time the .400/350 Nitro Express was one of the most popular and widely used medium bore cartridges for hunting in Africa, this popularity was in a large part a result of the excellent bullet design which gave uniform and dependable results.

== Use ==
While the .400/350 Nitro Express was not intended for hunting dangerous game, it was successfully used for hunting all African game. John "Pondoro" Taylor used a single-shot extensively on lion and other African big game, stating in his African Rifles and Cartridges that this was a favourite rifle of his and the cartridge produced excellent penetration and overall performance.

The later .350 Rigby No 2 uses the same cartridge case but fires a lighter projectile at higher velocities.

== See also ==
- Nitro Express
- List of rifle cartridges
- 9mm rifle cartridges
