= .275 No 2 Magnum =

Rifle cartridge

- Type: Rifle
- Place of origin: United Kingdom

Production history
- Designer: John Rigby & Company
- Designed: 1927
- Produced: 1927–present

Specifications
- Parent case: .375 Flanged Nitro Express
- Case type: Rimmed, bottleneck
- Bullet diameter: .284 in (7.2 mm)
- Neck diameter: .318 in (8.1 mm)
- Shoulder diameter: .450 in (11.4 mm)
- Base diameter: .510 in (13.0 mm)
- Rim diameter: .582 in (14.8 mm)
- Case length: 2.5 in (64 mm)
- Overall length: 3.26 in (83 mm)
- Case capacity: 75.2 gr H_{2}O (4.87 cm^{3})
- Primer type: Berdan 217

Ballistic performance
Bullet mass/type	Velocity	Energy
140 gr (9 g)	2,675 ft/s (815 m/s)	2,230 ft⋅lbf (3,020 J)

The .275 No 2 Magnum, also known as the 7mm Rigby Magnum Flanged and the .275 No 2 Rigby, is an obsolete centerfire rifle cartridge developed by John Rigby & Company in 1927.

== Overview ==
The .275 No 2 Magnum is a rimmed cartridge intended for use in double rifles. Rigby introduced the .275 No 2 Magnum by necking down the .375 Flanged Nitro Express, it was still available in the early 1960s. The .275 No 2 Magnum's performance is comparable to the .275 Rigby.

As is common with cartridges for double rifles, due to the need to regulate the two barrels to the same point of aim, the .275 No 2 Magnum was offered in one loading, firing a 140 gr (9.1 g) bullet with a listed speed of 2,675 ft/s (815 m/s).

In his African Rifles and Cartridges, John "Pondoro" Taylor rated the .275 No 2 Magnum as his favourite of all the small bore cartridges.

== See also ==
- List of rifle cartridges
- 7mm rifle cartridges
