= John Pollard (writer) =

British writer

- John Pollard (1961 dust jacket portrait for 'Africa for Adventure')
- Born: John Richard Thornhill Pollard; 5 April 1914; Exeter, England
- Died: 25 August 2013 (aged 99); Anglesey, Wales, United Kingdom
- Occupations: Hunter, naturalist, writer, Historian

John Richard Thornhill Pollard (5 April 1914 – 25 August 2013) was a British writer who wrote a number of books on classic history and his travels in Africa. His African books include many stories of Raymond Hook, a larger than life character who ran a zoo farm.

== Biography ==
John Pollard was born in Exeter in 1914, educated in Herefordshire and Devon and at Exeter College, Oxford. Formerly a classical schoolmaster, then a lecturer in Classics at St Andrews University and the University of Wales.

During WWII he served as an officer with the Devonshire Regiment and the King's African Rifles in Italian Somaliland, Abyssinia, Kenya and Uganda.

He travelled extensively throughout the whole African continent and throughout Europe, with a keen interest in mountaineering, natural history, angling and sport of every description.

He later moved to Bangor, North Wales with his wife and children.

== Books ==
=== Books on Africa ===
First editions of John Pollard's four African books, published by Robert Hale

==== Adventure Begins in Kenya (1957) ====
Published by Robert Hale, 1957. Pollard's first book set in Africa describes a quest for the rare Lammergeyer vulture-eagle. The search takes him to Mount Kenya where he is accompanied by remarkable hunter and naturalist, Raymond Hook.

==== Africa for Adventure (1961) ====
Published by Robert Hale, 1961. A follow up to his first book, Pollard recounts a further series of adventures with Raymond Hook throughout East Africa. Including tales of charging elephants, dangerous snakes, man-eating lions and tragedy on an icy mountain.

==== African Zoo Man (1963) ====
Published by Robert Hale, 1963. Pollard's biography of his remarkable friend Raymond Hook. Recounting Hook's search for the Spotted Lion, running an African zoo, milking deadly puff adders, surviving two World Wars, and racing cheetahs against Greyhounds.

==== The Long Safari (1967) ====
Published by Robert Hale, 1967. Pollard's fourth and final book set in Africa, he recounts his ambitious 2,000 mile safari from Mwingi, Kenya through the wilderness to reach Eritrea on the Red Sea.

=== History Books ===
- Journey to the Styx (C.Johnson, 1955)
- Wolves and Werewolves (Robert Hale, 1964)
- Seers, Shrines and Sirens (George Allen & Unwin, 1965)
- Helen of Troy (Robert Hale, 1965)
- Birds in Greek Life and Myth (Thames and Hudson, 1977)
