= R. J. D. "Samaki" Salmon =

R. J. D. Salmon MVO, MC
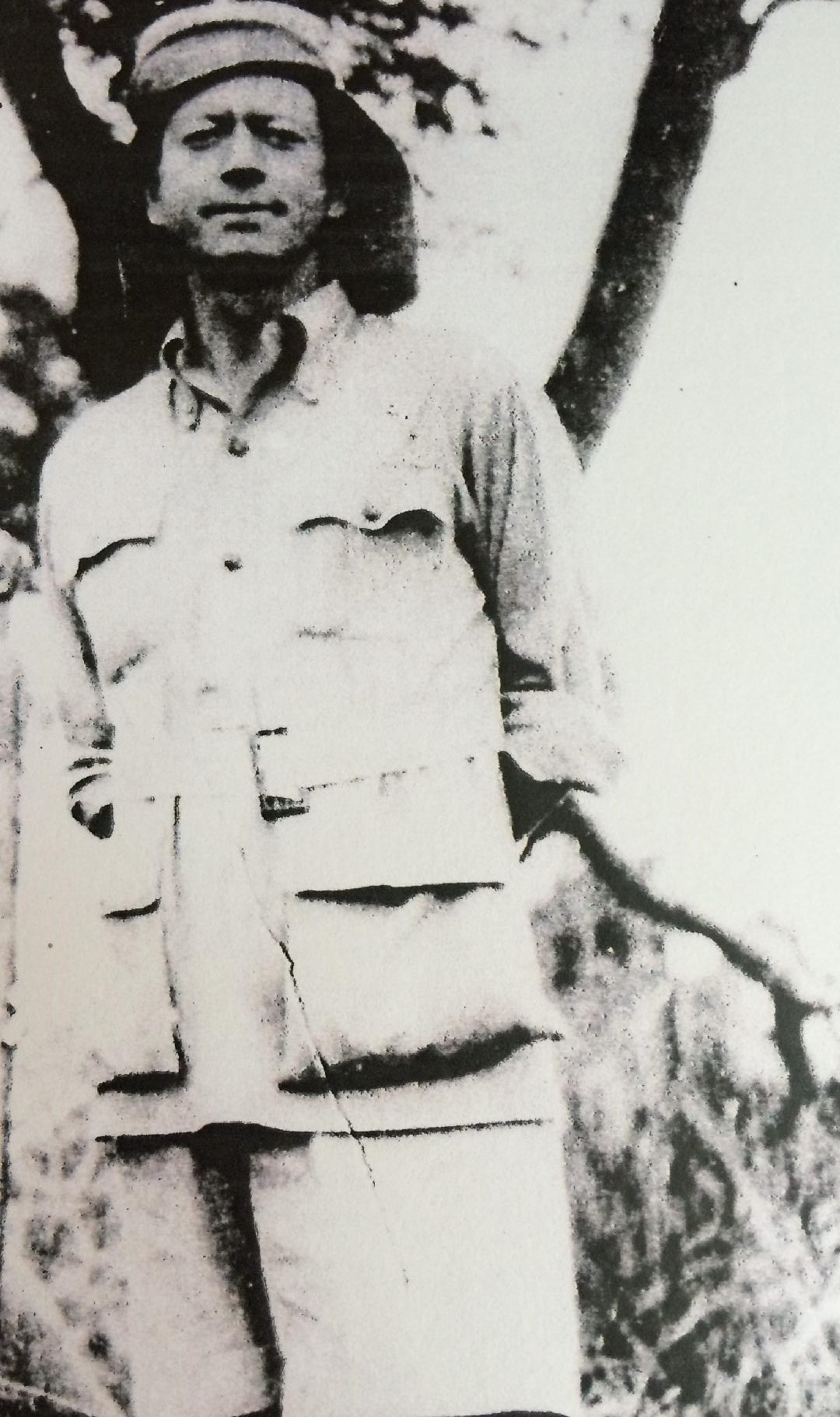
- Salmon, 1925
- Born: Roy John Dugdale Salmon; 1888; Auckland, New Zealand
- Died: 1952 (aged 63–64); South Africa
- Other name: Samaki
- Occupation: Game warden
- Years active: 1924–1949
- Employer: Uganda Game Department
- Spouse: Celia (de Groot)
- Children: Charmain
- Awards: Member of the Royal Victorian Order
- Military career
- Allegiance: British Empire
- Branch: British Army
- Service years: 1914–1920
- Rank: Captain
- Unit: King's African Rifles
- Awards: Military Cross

Roy John Dugdale "Samaki" Salmon, MVO, MC (1888–1952) was a New Zealand-born game warden and elephant control officer in the Uganda Protectorate.

== Early life ==
Salmon was born in Auckland in 1888, being educated and spending his early life there. Salmon stood around 6 feet 1 inch (185 cm) and was strongly built, he was described as cool and unexcitable with nerves of steel and a great sense of humour. In 1911 at the age of 23, Salmon boarded a ship for Africa in search of adventure, disembarking in Mombasa later in the year, he remained there for almost a year conducting a variety of jobs. In 1912 Salmon set out for the remote Uganda Protectorate with the intention of becoming a coffee grower, his initial efforts at growing coffee in the Busoga district were unsuccessful, so he moved to the area of Fort Portal where he enjoyed more success and settled permanently.

== Great War service ==
In 1914 with the outbreak of World War I, Salmon volunteered for service and was commissioned in December 1914 into the King's African Rifles. Initially serving under Tracy Philipps, Salmon served throughout the East African Campaign, participating in a number of raids into German East Africa. In 1917 Salmon was awarded the Military Cross for his actions, the citation stating:

For conspicuous gallantry and devotion to duty. He swam a rapid and crocodile-infested river by night, two hundred yards from an enemy post, taking a rope with him with which he afterwards pulled a boat across. He then armed himself with bombs and proceeded to scout up the enemy's side of the river. This fearless act enabled us to cross the river, which otherwise presented many difficulties.

By war's end Salmon achieved the rank of captain, he was not demobilised until 1920, returning to his coffee plantation afterwards. It was during his wartime service that Salmon received the nickname "Samaki", Swahili for fish, a name that was to stick to him for the remainder of his life.

== Coffee grower ==
As the owner of a coffee plantation, Salmon was able to obtain a planter's elephant hunting licence, this allowed the license holder to shoot 20 elephant a year to protect their plantations from the depredations of elephant. Salmon gained a reputation as a skilled elephant hunter, always filling his quota quickly and efficiently.

== Game warden ==
In 1924, in an effort to combat the destruction to cropping and fencing caused by elephant that prevented the development of agriculture, the Ugandan Government created the Uganda Game Department, appointing Captain Charles R.S. Pitman as chief game warden. The entire Protectorate was divided into four large districts and a white hunter with extensive experience, along with a large native staff, was recruited as a game ranger to control the elephant numbers in each district. Salmon was recruited, along with Captain C.K.D. Palmer-Kerrison and veteran ivory hunters and poachers Pete Pearson and F.G. "Deaf" Banks. At the time there were estimated to be over 16,000 elephant in Uganda, with an annual increase of 12%, and the elephant control section found it necessary to shoot 13,096 head between 1925 and 1935 in order to keep the population within defined parks and areas of unused land. The four white hunters were provided with a salary of £50 a month, and to further improve their lot, in 1925 the Governor of Uganda, Sir William Gowers, made them Colonial Civil Servants by official decree, ensuring a lifetime pension.

=== Hunting preferences and records ===
It is estimated that over the course of his life Salmon shot up to 4,000 elephant, more than anyone else in history. Throughout his career Salmon set a number of elephant hunting records that were unparalleled by other hunters, he once shot 40 elephants in a day, 70 elephant in three days and 230 elephant in three weeks and on one occasion 12 elephant with 14 shots in less than two minutes, like W.D.M. "Karamojo" Bell, Salmon possessed detailed knowledge of elephant anatomy and his hunting technique kept a herd together, instead of scattering at the first shot. Unlike elephant hunters who shot large tuskers for their ivory, in the course of his duties Salmon shot bulls, cows and calves in as humane a way as possible.

Salmon used two .416 Rigby bolt-action rifles for the majority of his elephant hunting, although he owned a .470 Nitro Express double rifle which he used occasionally then he had to follow a wounded elephant into thick vegetation, the double rifle allowing for an immediate second shot.

Salmon was ably assisted in his duties by his gunbearer Mussa, who was renowned for his ability to rapidly reload for Salmon, allowing him to maintain continuous fire. Mussa achieved a degree of fame, once being the subject of a full-page feature in The Field magazine where he was described as "The Prince of Gun-bearers".

Salmon was unique among professional elephant hunters in that he did not consider the African elephant to be intelligent, writing in The Field magazine in 1951: "My outstanding impression is of the pathetic stupidity of the overwhelming majority of them. Between the fortieth and fiftieth elephants, the not-so-stupid one would turn up; and then the idea that the whole elephant race was pathetic would be in abeyance for an indefinite period."

=== Royal guide ===
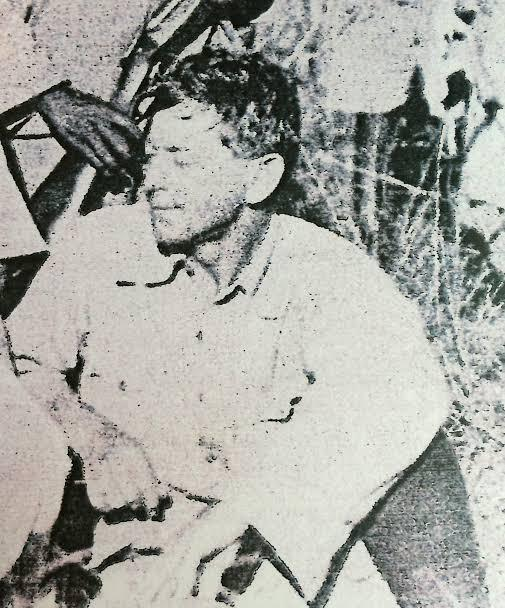
Salmon, 1928

In 1924 Salmon, along with Pete Pearson, accompanied a safari for the Duke and Duchess of York (later King George VI and Queen Elizabeth the Queen Mother) as hunting guides during their visit to Uganda. In 1928 Salmon, again with Pearson, organised an 8 day hunting safari for the Prince of Wales (later King Edward VIII) during the Uganda leg of his East African royal tour. On the last day of the safari the royal party were following the tracks of a bull elephant near the Murchison Falls when they were charged by another rogue bull, Pearson grabbed the Prince and flung him to safety (into a thorn bush) then he and Salmon fired simultaneously at the elephant, which crashed dead to the ground 4 yards (3.7 m) from the Prince.

Salmon again guided the Prince of Wales on a safari during a royal tour of Uganda in 1930 (this time without Pearson who died in 1929). A notable incident during that tour occurred when the prince requested to see Fort Portal in the fabled Mountains of the Moon, Salmon began guiding the royal party from their boat on the Semliki River, not having been in that area for five years and realising the paths had become overgrown, as dusk approached Salmon begrudgingly admitted he was lost. The entire party, including the prince, spent the night huddled in the rain sharing a bottle of whiskey, the prince amused at Salmon's discomfort at getting the heir to British throne lost in the jungle.

In 1932 Salmon guided King Albert I of Belgium on a safari and in 1938 Prince Henry, Duke of Gloucester.

=== Chief game warden ===
In 1930 Charles Pitman was seconded to Rhodesia and Salmon was appointed Uganda's chief game warden, continuing in that capacity until ill-health forced him to retire in 1949. In this role, Salmon was actively involved in extending the boundaries of Uganda’s national parks as well as advocating for the creation of new reserves, Salmon's goal as chief game warden was to allow humans and wildlife to coexist within Uganda.

Salmon's reputation as a game warden and elephant hunter was widespread, with articles about him and his exploits appearing in magazines such as The Field and Country Life. Upon his coronation in 1937, King George VI appointed Salmon to the Royal Victorian Order as a Member of the Forth Class.

== Marriage ==
In 1931 at the age of 43, Salmon met a young South African woman Celia de Groot, who had been travelling alone from Durban to Port Said in her small car, the pair marrying soon afterwards. Celia was a slim woman of medium height who was always impeccably dressed and who was herself a keen hunter and expert shot. Every year Celia hunted three elephant, as were permitted with a sporting license, always with her right handed 7x57 Mauser rifle, despite her being left handed. Celia always shot her elephant in the head, and always hunted with only a native tracker, she shot around 50 elephant over the course of her life. The pair had one child, a daughter Charmain.

== Later life ==
Upon his retirement from the Uganda Game Department, Salmon and Celia moved to South Africa, purchasing a farm in Natal where Salmon died six years later in 1952.

== See also ==
- List of famous big game hunters
- W.D.M. "Karamojo" Bell
- James H. Sutherland
