= William Westley Richards =

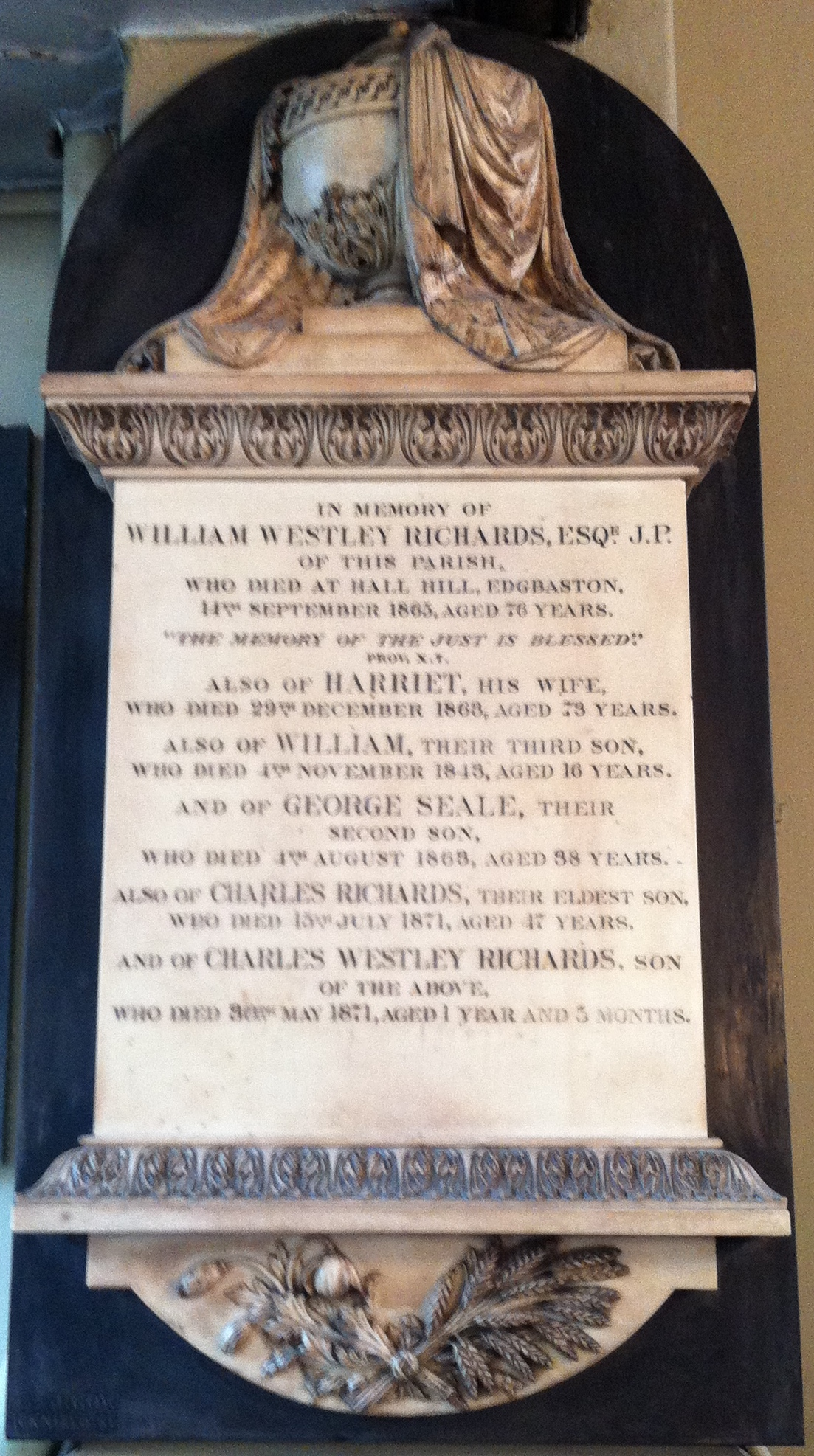
Memorial to William Westley Richards in St Philip's Cathedral, Birmingham

William Westley Richards (24 November 1789 – 11 September 1865) was a British firearms manufacturer and founder of Westley Richards.

Richards was born in Birmingham, Warwickshire, England to Theophilus Richards and Mary Bingham.

He married his first wife, Ann Barlow in 1813. They had six children: Westley, Emma, Caroline, Edward Harding, Ellen, and Mary Anne. William and Ann divorced before 1823. He married his second wife, Harriett Seale (1793–1865) on 18 January 1823 at St Pancras Old Church, London. He had three children by his second marriage, Charles, George Seale, and William.

William died 11 September 1865 at Hall Hill, Edgbaston, Warwickshire.

In 1812, at the age of 22, he established the Westley Richards gunmaking business in Birmingham, which still bears his name. His family background had been in fine jewellery, cutlery and the gun trade. He coined the motto, "to be the maker of as good a gun as can be made" which is still used.

Richards was an innovator, creating a number of gun-related patents. The most significant were the patent relating to the use of a new waterproof primer for the ignition of percussion guns and also the first flip-up sight, which went on to be used by the British Army. Richards opened a gun store in London in 1815 on New Bond Street. The store was owned and managed by William Bishop, known as the Bishop of Bond Street.

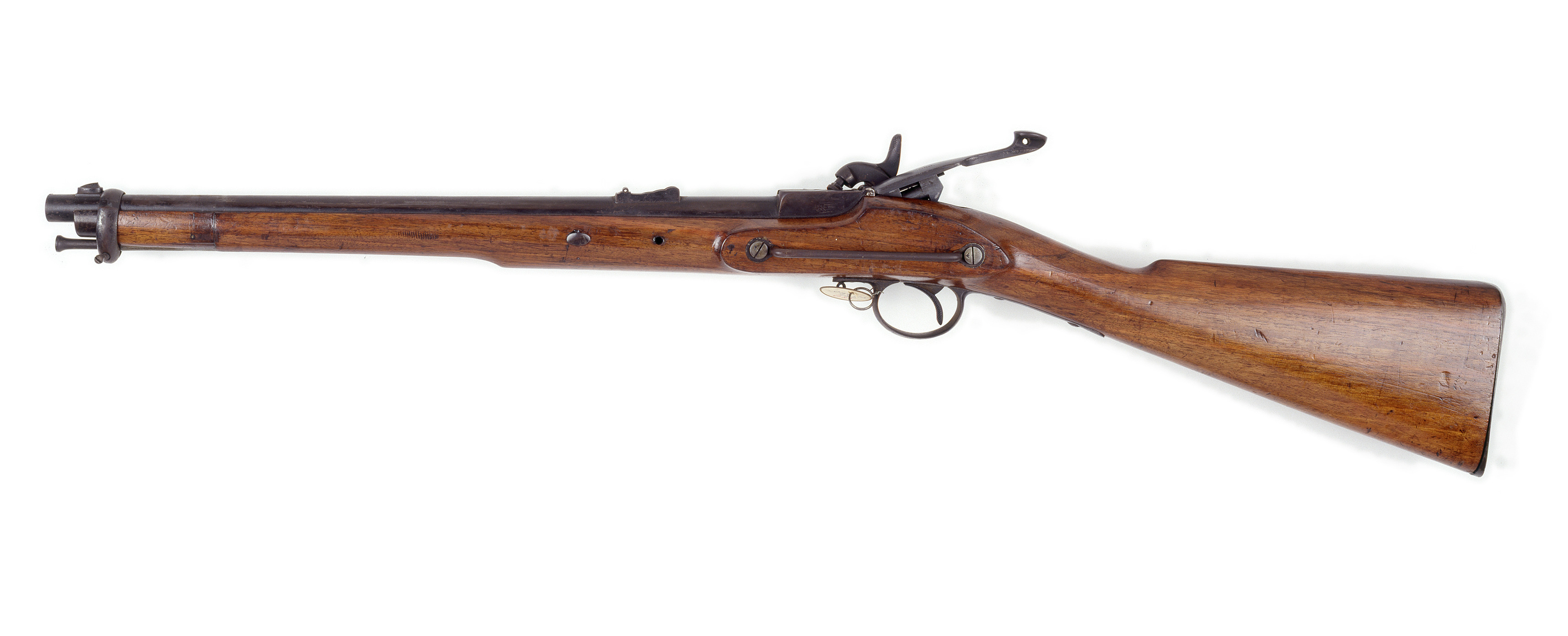
Westley Richards' Cavalry carbine, 1865

Control of the gunsmith company was inherited by Westley Richards, eldest son of the founder. Richards carried on in a similar vein to his father, innovating various guns and registering patents.
