= .350 Rigby =

Centerfire rifle cartridge

- Type: Rifle
- Place of origin: United Kingdom

Production history
- Designer: John Rigby & Company
- Designed: 1908
- Produced: 1908

Specifications
- Case type: Rimless, bottleneck
- Bullet diameter: .358 in (9.1 mm)
- Neck diameter: .383 in (9.7 mm)
- Shoulder diameter: .455 in (11.6 mm)
- Base diameter: .517 in (13.1 mm)
- Rim diameter: .534 in (13.6 mm)
- Case length: 2.742 in (69.6 mm)
- Overall length: 3.44 in (87 mm)
- Case capacity: 91.4 gr H_{2}O (5.92 cm^{3})

Ballistic performance
Bullet mass/type	Velocity	Energy
225 gr (15 g)	2,625 ft/s (800 m/s)	3,440 ft⋅lbf (4,660 J)
- Test barrel length: 24 in Sources: Barnes & Kynoch.

.350 Rigby No 2

Specifications
- Parent case: .400/350 Nitro Express
- Case type: Rimmed, bottleneck
- Bullet diameter: .358 in (9.1 mm)
- Neck diameter: .379 in (9.6 mm)
- Shoulder diameter: .419 in (10.6 mm)
- Base diameter: .468 in (11.9 mm)
- Rim diameter: .518 in (13.2 mm)
- Rim thickness: .050 in (1.3 mm)
- Case length: 2.749 in (69.8 mm)
- Overall length: 3.685 in (93.6 mm)
- Case capacity: 78.1 gr H_{2}O (5.06 cm^{3})

Ballistic performance
Bullet mass/type	Velocity	Energy
225 gr (15 g)	2,600 ft/s (790 m/s)	3,400 ft⋅lbf (4,600 J)
- Test barrel length: 26 in Sources: Barnes & Kynoch.

The .350 Rigby and .350 Rigby No 2 are proprietary medium bore rifle cartridges developed by John Rigby & Company.

== Design ==
The .350 Rigby and .350 Rigby No 2 are both bottlenecked centerfire rifle cartridges, originally both cartridges fired a bullet of .358 inches (9.1 mm) weighing 225 grains (14.6 g).

=== .350 Rigby ===
The .350 Rigby, also known as the .350 Rigby Magnum and the .350 Rigby Nitro Express, is a rimless cartridge intended for use in Mauser magnum length bolt action magazine sporting rifles, it fires its bullet at a muzzle velocity of 2,625 feet per second (800 m/s).

=== .350 Rigby No 2 ===
The .350 Rigby No 2 is the rimmed version of the .350 Rigby, intended for use in single shot and double rifles, it shares the same cartridge case as the Rigby's earlier .400/350 Nitro Express, but fires the lighter 225 grain bullet of the .350 Rigby at a muzzle velocity of 2,600 feet per second (790 m/s).

== History ==
John Rigby & Co introduced both cartridges in 1908, intended for use as an all-round African hunting rounds, they were somewhat overshadowed by the arrival of the .375 Holland & Holland in 1912, although some sportsmen preferred these cartridges to the latter as the Rigby cartridges had less recoil.

== Use ==
The .350 Rigby and .350 Rigby No 2 have been used successfully as general purpose African hunting cartridges on most African game species.

Famous users included Denys Finch Hatton, Pete Pearson and John "Pondoro" Taylor. In his African Rifles and Cartridges Taylor wrote of the .350 Rigby "There is nothing spectacular about this cartridge; it has never had the write-up that the .318 Westley Richards and .375 Holland & Holland Magnum get from time to time; nevertheless, it is splendidly effective at ranges of up to at least 150 yd (140 m) and kills as instantaneously as the .375 Holland & Holland Magnum. In addition, it has an appreciably lighter recoil."

== See also ==
- Nitro Express
- List of rifle cartridges
- 9mm rifle cartridges
