= Westley Richards Monkey Tail =

19th-century English firearm

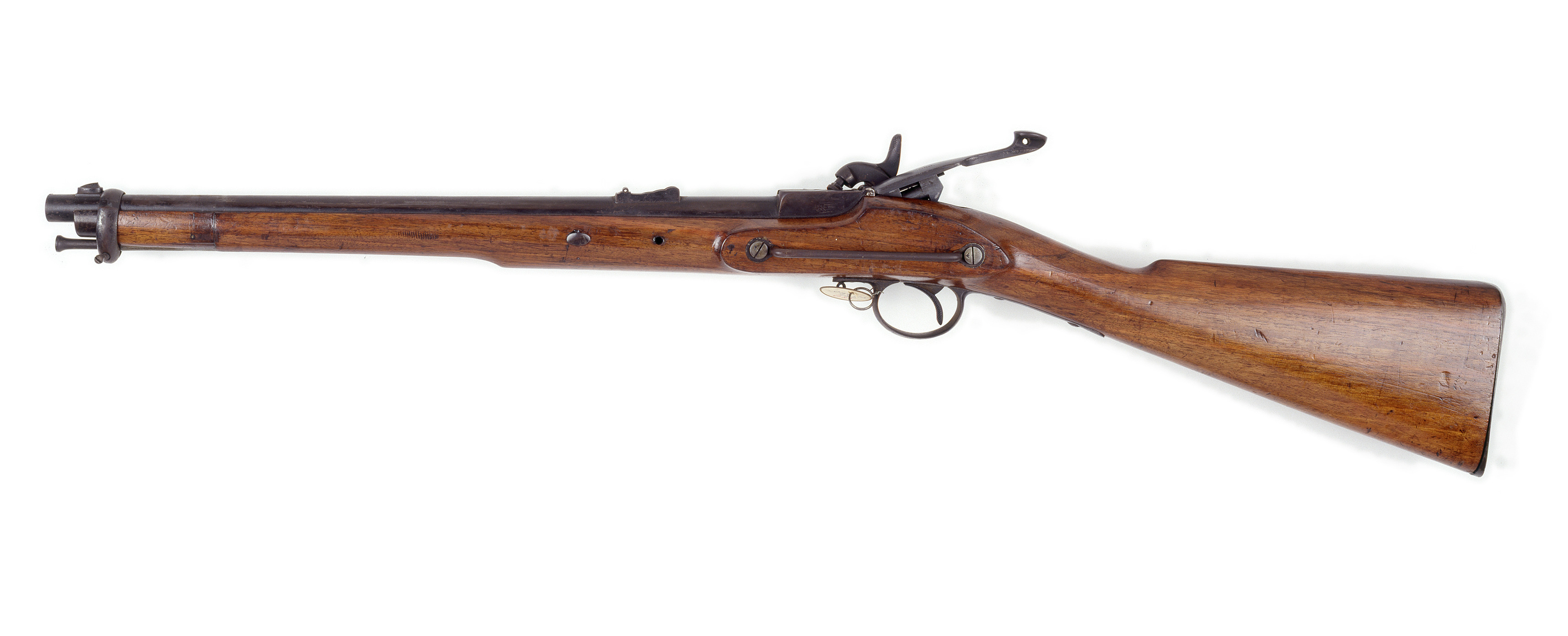
- A Westley Richards Monkey Tail carbine.
- Type: Breechloader Service Rifle or Carbine
- Place of origin: England

Service history
- In service: 1866-1880
- Used by: See Users
- Wars: Fenian Raids; Xhosa Wars; Australian frontier wars Anglo-Zulu War; First Boer War; Second Boer War

Production history
- Designer: William Westley Richards
- Unit cost: £24
- No. built: Approximately 61,000
- Variants: See Variants

Specifications
- Length: 36-39 inch (Rifle Variants); 20-25 inch (Carbine Variants)
- Cartridge: .450; .451; .455; .483
- Action: Percussion Cap Breechloader
- Effective firing range: 400 yards (365.76 m)
- Maximum firing range: 800 yards (731.52 m)
- Feed system: Single-shot

The Westley Richards Monkey Tail, commonly known simply as the Monkey Tail was a series of breechloading percussion cap firearms invented and designed by the British firearm manufacturer Westley Richards. The firearm nickname is derived from the long lever on top of the action used to open and close the breechblock which looked like a monkey's tail when fully opened.

== Overview ==
In 1858 Westley Richards, a prominent gunsmith firm headquartered in Birmingham received patent for a unique breechloading design. The firearm's action involved a lever which, when lifted, exposed the entire chamber and allowed a paper cartridge to be inserted. This cartridge featured a greased piece of felt wadding which helped to both seal and lubricate the bore when fired. When the lever was opened it resembled a monkey's tail, which quickly became the firearm's unofficial name.

In 1860 Richards submitted his design to the War Office, which was in the process of adopting a standardised carbine for cavalry troops. The War Office officially accepted Richard's design in 1866 and purchased over 2,000 carbines directly from Richards, a further 19,000 were made at the Royal Small Arms Factory under the Enfield licence. A substantial amount of rifled muskets, such as the Pattern 1853 Enfield were also converted to the Monkey Tail breechloading system. According to firearms historian Brian C. Knapp, the Monkey Tail was "the most successful of all British made capping breech loaders". Unfortunate for Richards, the same year his carbine was accepted, the British military had already adopted the simpler Snider–Enfield which chambered a self-contained metallic cartridge. According to the American Rifleman, while many Monkey Tail rifles and carbines remained in service, many were eventually replaced by the Snider-Enfield.

== Design ==
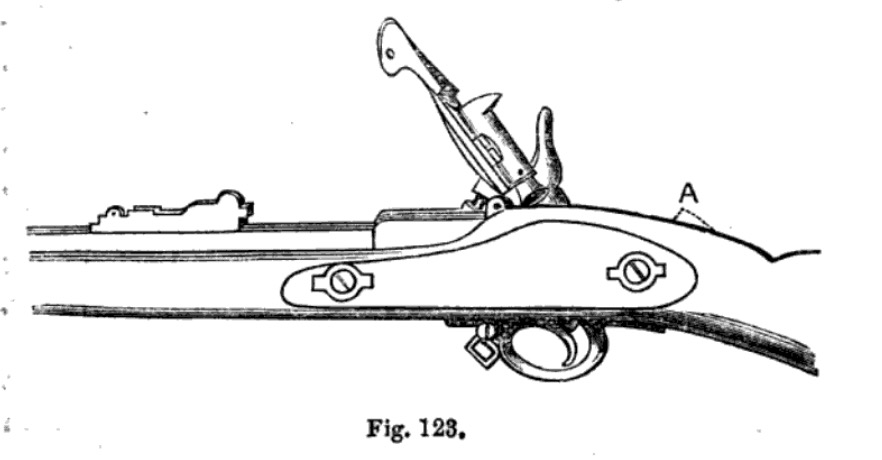
An illustration of the breech of a Westley Richards "monkey tail" rifle

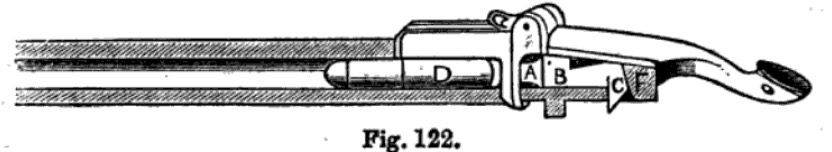
A cutaway drawing of the breech's interior

The common Monkey Tail rifle and carbine fired a .450 calibre (52-bore) bullet made out of cast lead with a charge of roughly 55 grains of black powder. Different variants of the Monkey Tail shot different calibres or were sometimes rebored entirely by civilian hunters. Calibres which the Westley Richards Monkey Tail shot include: .450, .451, .455, and .483.

Richard's 1866 patent incorporates Whitworth rifle pattern hexagonal rifling and a groove depth of .480. The locking system utilised by Richard includes a sliding plunger that was actuated by the pressure of the cartridge being fired, moving backwards and locking the breech so it could not open until the pressure had subsided. As a double safety, the hammer was machined in such a way that the breech could only be opened when the hammer nose was resting on the cone (nipple). Placing the gun on half-cock or full-cock prevented the action from being opened unintentionally. Alternatively, if the firearm could not be loading using the breech block system, the firearm could still be loaded and used as a muzzleloader.

== Military use ==
Although considered obsolete by the 1870s the Monkey Tail continued to be used by the British military well into the 1880s. British Yeomanry Cavalry units that received the carbine variant include: the Royal Wiltshire Yeomanry, the Duke of Lancaster's Own Yeomanry, the Queen's Own Royal Glasgow Yeomanry, the Uxbridge Yeomanry, and the Berkshire Yeomanry. Other cavalry regiments who received large quantities of the Monkey Tail include: the 10th Royal Hussars, the 18th Royal Hussars, and the Carabiniers (6th Dragoon Guards).

The first known military use of the Monkey Tail in battle was during the Fenian raids, some 2,000 36" (91.44 cm) Monkey Tail rifles were ordered for use by the garrison in Montreal. Both the South African Republic and the Orange Free State purchased large quantities of Monkey Tail rifles and carbines for civilian big-game hunting and Boer commando use. both variants of the Westley Richards Monkey Tail were used during the First Boer War, most notably at the Battle of Majuba Hill where the majority of the 400 Boers who attacked the hill were armed with Monkey Tails.

According to South African historian John Laband:

"The most popular firearm of all was the British-made 1866 pattern Westley Richards rifle which the Boers personalised as "Wessel Rykaard" or "Wessel Riekert". It was a .450 calibre, falling block, single action breech-loading rifle firing a no.2 cartridge, and which was very accurate up to 600 yards".

== Variants ==
- Monkey Tail Rifle: The full-sized rifle variant of the Monkey Tail consisted of a 36" (91.44 cm) or 39" (99.06 cm) barrel and is capable of accepting the P-1864 Snider Rifle Short Socket Bayonet.
- Monkey Tail Carbine: The carbine variant of the Monkey Tail consisted of a 19" (48.26 cm), 20" (50.8 cm), and 25" (63.5 cm) barrels with a graduated sights for 400, 700, and 800 yards.
- Monkey Tail Pistol: Pistol variants of the Monkey Tail were made exclusively from cut-down and modified carbines. The Monkey Tail pistols themselves only had 9" (22.86 cm) barrels. No more than 1,000 pistols were ever produced for the Portuguese military as simpler to produce metallic cartridge revolvers had already rendered the breechloading Monkey Tail pistols obsolete.

== Centrefire conversion ==
For some time Richards attempted to convert many of his Monkey Tail paper cartridge firearms to accept centrefire brass cartridges, only 500-600 of these conversions were made, and according to Forgotten Weapons, only 13 are known to still exist. After converting existing Monkey Tail rifles and carbines, Richards went on to perfect the Westley Richards Improved Martini–Henry rifle and later the Deely-Edge falling-block rifle.

== Users ==
- British Empire: A total of 61,000 variants were produced for the British Empire and its colonies, however, most were eventually replaced by the easier to produce Snider–Enfield.
- Australia: Members of the Victorian Yeomanry (volunteer light cavalry) of Melbourne were significantly armed with the carbine variant.
- South African Republic: Citizens of the South African Republic (ZAR) privately purchased a large amount of Monkey Tail rifles and carbines.
- Orange Free State: In 1883 the Orange Free State (OVS) purchased and imported roughly 500 of Richard's carbines and rifles, alongside many Martini–Henry rifles. One example of an OVS marked carbine is held by the National Army Museum in London.
- Portugal: In 1867 Richards was contracted to supply 8,000 Monkey Tail rifles and 2,000 carbines to the Portuguese Army via Luís da Câmara Leme. The contract also included 1,000 pistols made out of cut-down carbines.
- Portuguese Mozambique: Military forces and colonial police of Portuguese Mozambique were equipped with both the rifle and carbine variants.
