= J. A. Hunter =

Scottish hunter (1887–1963)

John Alexander Hunter
- Born: John Alexander Hunter; 3 June 1882; Scotland
- Died: 27 June 1963 (aged 81); Kenya
- Occupation: Professional hunter
- Spouse: Hilda Bunbury
- Children: 6

John Alexander Hunter (3 June 1882 – 27 June 1963) was a white hunter in Africa from the early 1900s through the 1950s who led many notable safaris.

== Biography ==
John Alexander Hunter was born on 30 May 1887 near Shearington, Dumfries-shire, Scotland.

He moved permanently to British East Africa in 1908, where he later led the Livermore expedition, with the aid of A.P.de K.Fourie, that opened up the Ngorongoro Crater to European hunters. He held several world records for big game at various times, and killed over 1,000 rhinos in Kenya, most of them in the Makueni hunting ground, which the Government needed to get rid of, in order to give these lands for re-settlement of the Kamba people. Besides safaris and other control operations for the Kenya Game Department, in Makueni Hunter killed 996 alone, from 26 August 1944 to 31 October 1946. It turned out that those lands were useless for human settlement. In later years, he became concerned about the possible extinction of the wildlife he had so assiduously hunted, and spoke in favour of conservation. His writings were notable for betraying his colonialist attitude, although his writings similarly betrayed a genuine respect and affection for the locales and peoples that he interacted with.

In 1918 he married Hilda Bunbury. They had 6 children, Doreen, Sheila, Lesley, Gordon, Dennis and David. His grandson Alex Hunter inherited his way of life and is a safari guide in Kenya. He was a friend and contemporary of Denys Finch Hatton, who was portrayed by Robert Redford in the movie Out of Africa. In his published writings Hunter wrote of his friend and fellow professional hunter, and the tragic circumstances of Hatton's death. In 1958 he built the Hunters' Lodge hotel in Makindu, Kenya where he died in 1963.

== Books ==
White Hunter (1938)

Published by Seeley, Service & Co. Ltd. of London in 1938. Specifically about his safaris before World War II. The original 1938 edition is a scarce collector's item. Also a later reprint of 1,000 limited editions by Safari Press, 1986. The book was the basis for the White Hunter British television series of 1957.

Hunter (1952)

Published by Hamish Hamilton in the United Kingdom in 1952. An autobiography recounting 40 years as a white hunter in British East Africa. Including his move from Scotland to Africa as a young man, hunting rogue elephants, working with Masai spear man against lions, exploring the hidden Isle of Fumve, leading a safari across the Serengeti and more.

African Hunter (1954)

Published by Hamish Hamilton, in the United Kingdom in 1954. A condensed version, for younger readers, of J. A. Hunter's autobiography, Hunter (1952).

African Bush Adventures (1954)

Also known as Tales of the African Frontier. With Daniel P. Mannix, published by Hamish Hamilton in the United Kingdom in 1954. Also published under the title Tales of the African Frontier (Harper & Brothers, USA 1954) and the basis for the 1959 movie Killers of Kilimanjaro. J. A. Hunter and Daniel P. Mannix re-tell the true life stories of some of Africa's early settlers, slavers, ivory hunters, missionaries, traders and police officers.

Hunter's Tracks (1957)

Assisted by Alan Wykes. Published by Hamish Hamilton of London in 1957. Chronicling J. A. Hunter's role in the hunt and capture of an ivory smuggler over 11 chapters, interspersed with reminisces about memorable hunts and characters, including a close call with crocodiles, a grand safari with a Maharajah, and a hand-to-hand fight with a lion.

== See also ==
- List of famous big game hunters
- John "Pondoro" Taylor
- W. D. M. Bell
- Denys Finch Hatton
- Peter Hathaway Capstick
- John Pollard (writer)
- Jim Corbett
