= White Hunter (TV series) =

1957 British television series

White Hunter is a 1957 British television series based on the book White Hunter by J. A. Hunter; it ran for 39 episodes. It starred Rhodes Reason and Harry Baird; several episodes starred Hugh Moxey as Purley. It was produced by Norman Williams, husband of Patricia Dainton. Some episodes were edited together as the feature Man Eater.
