= .318 Westley Richards =

UK centerfire rifle cartridge

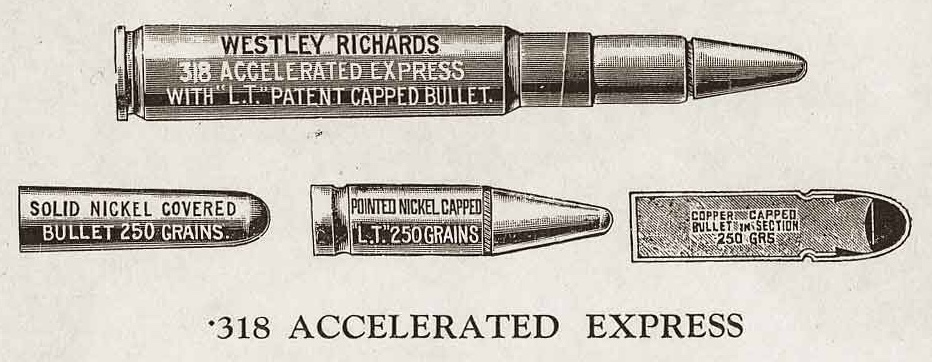
- Illustration from the 1938-39 Westley Richards brochure
- Type: Rifle
- Place of origin: England

Production history
- Designer: Westley Richards
- Designed: 1906
- Produced: 1906–present

Specifications
- Case type: Rimless, bottleneck
- Bullet diameter: .330 in (8.4 mm)
- Land diameter: .318 in (8.1 mm)
- Neck diameter: .358 in (9.1 mm)
- Shoulder diameter: .436 in (11.1 mm)
- Base diameter: .464 in (11.8 mm)
- Rim diameter: .464 in (11.8 mm)
- Case length: 2.368 in (60.1 mm)
- Overall length: 3.349 in (85.1 mm)
- Case capacity: 69.1 gr H_{2}O (4.48 cm^{3})

Ballistic performance
Bullet mass/type	Velocity	Energy
180 gr (12 g)	2,700 ft/s (820 m/s)	2,920 ft⋅lbf (3,960 J)
250 gr (16 g)	2,400 ft/s (730 m/s)	3,194 ft⋅lbf (4,330 J)
- Test barrel length: 28 in Sources: The Spanish Association of Cartridge Collectors & Kynoch.

The .318 Westley Richards, also known as the .318 Rimless Nitro Express and the .318 Accelerated Express, is a proprietary medium bore centerfire rifle cartridge developed by Westley Richards.

== Design ==
Westley Richards introduced the .318, primarily for use in their M98 Mauser and later their P14 Enfield based bolt action sporting rifles.

The .318 Westley Richards is a rimless bottlenecked cartridge intended for big game hunting throughout the British Empire. The bullet diameter is actually .330 in (8.4 mm) caliber, the naming is due to British nomenclature which sometimes names cartridges by their land diameter rather than the more commonly applied groove diameter.

Westley Richards offered solid, soft-point or the revolutionary LT-capped (Note: The LT-capped bullet was named after Leslie B Taylor (1863-1930) an engineer and lifelong employee at Westley Richards who, among many inventions, designs and patents, invented the 'Capped Bullet', a revolutionary bullet design that allowed for both maximum shock effect whilst ensuring maximum stability and accuracy.) bullets in two loadings, the more common being a 250 gr (16 g) bullet with a listed speed of 2,400 ft/s (730 m/s), whilst a lighter loading firing a 180 gr (12 g) bullet at 2,700 ft/s (820 m/s) was also offered for lighter game. The 250gr bullet possessed high sectional density and thus excellent penetration.

== History ==
In 1907 British authorities banned military-calibre sporting and hunting rifles in India and Sudan, including ones chambered in .375/303 Westley Richards Accelerated Express. That necessitated to develop an analog in another bore.

Even though most sources state the .318 Westley Richards was introduced in 1910, in fact a Westley Richards catalogue contains a testimonial from a satisfied customer dated March 1909 who used his rifle to take 10 elephants, indicating the cartridge must have been introduced by at least 1908. Upon the introduction of the .318 Westley Richards, Westley Richards effectively stopped marketing their .375/303.

The .318 Westley Richards was one of the most popular medium-bore cartridges used in Africa, even after the introduction of the .375 Holland & Holland. As with many British proprietary cartridges, the .318 Westley Richards was forced into obsolescence when Kynoch suspended ammunition manufacturing in the 1960s. Kynamco resumed manufacture of the Kynoch range of cartridges in the 1980s meaning the ammunition is again commercially available, although no firearms manufacturers make factory rifles in .318 Westley Richards today with the exception of Westley Richards themselves..

== Use ==
While the cartridge is not intended for dangerous game, it has been used successfully on all African game species up to and including elephant. The cartridge was a contemporary of and very similar in performance to the .333 Jeffery, both were somewhat overshadowed by the arrival of the .375 Holland & Holland.

In his African Rifles and Cartridges, John "Pondoro" Taylor wrote that the 250 gr (16 g) .318 Westley Richards is "fully capable of driving its bullet the full length of a big elephant's body."

W.D.M. "Karamojo" Bell wrote that the .318 Westley Richards was a more reliable killer for certain shots on bull elephant than his favoured .275 (7×57mm Mauser) but that he had trouble with misfires with the sporting .318 ammunition. By 1913, he had adopted the .318 in preference to his .275 Rigby-Mauser rifle. On one occasion Bell used a pair of .318 Westley Richards rifles to take nine elephants with nine shots, he later wrote "In my opinion, the 250 gr (16 g) .318 Westley Richards, although far from perfect, approaches most nearly the big game hunter's ideal bullet".

James H. Sutherland, who over the course of his life shot between 1,300 and 1,600 elephants, used a .318 Westley Richards along with a .577 Nitro Express double rifle for all his African hunting, in a letter to Westley Richards he wrote "In open country, against Elephants and Rhinoceroses where the quarry is difficult to approach and long shots are often required I find that I can do all that is requisite with the .318 Westley Richards using of course, solid nickel covered bullets."

Bror Blixen once states that if he could only have one rifle with which to hunt it would be the .318 Westly Richards.

Other users of the .318 Westley Richards include Major G.H. Anderson who shot between 350 and 400 elephants; and Quentin Grogan who shot between 250 and 300 elephants.

== See also ==
- Nitro Express
- List of rifle cartridges
