= William Bishop (gun seller) =

English gun dealer (1797–1871)

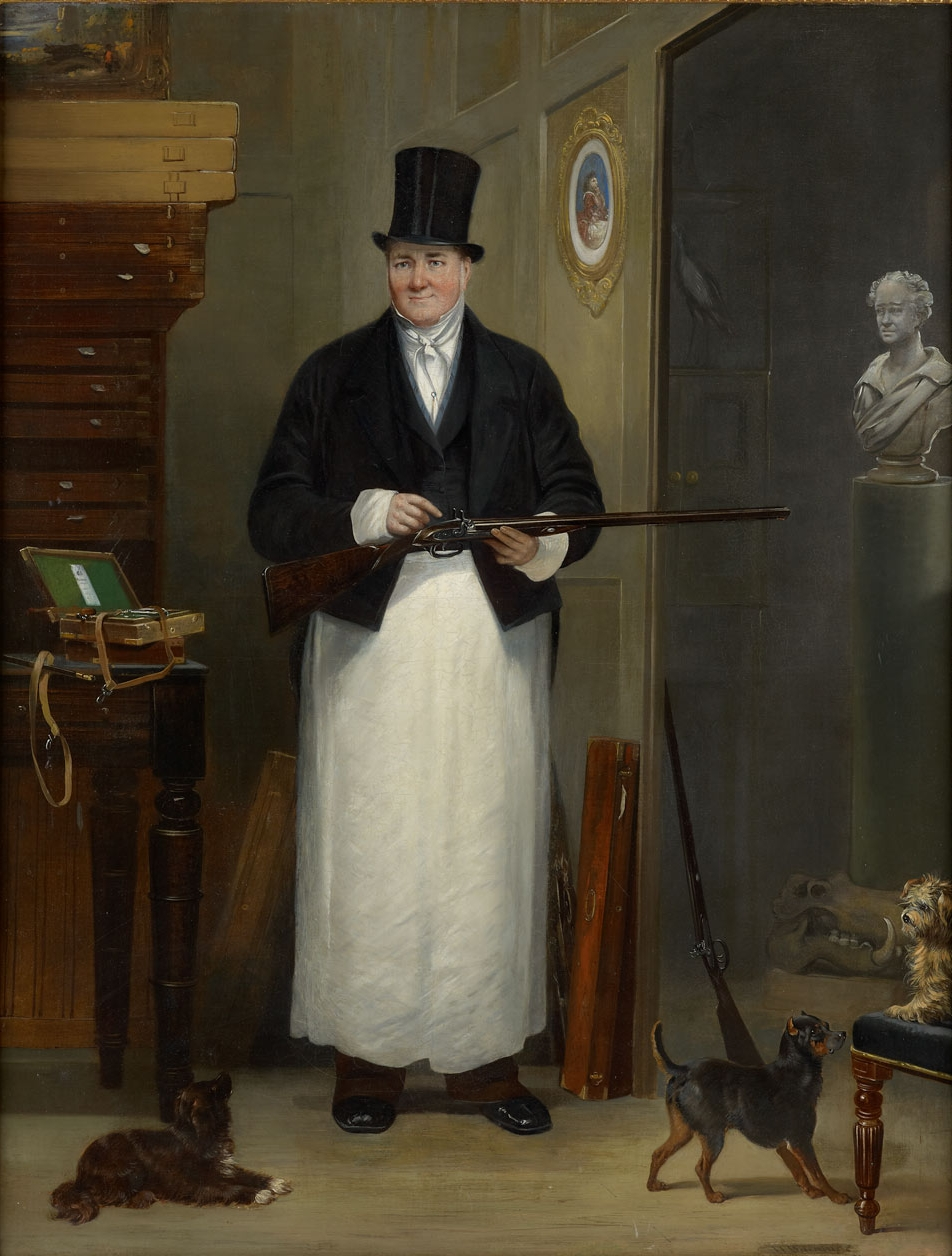
Portrait of the "Bishop of Bond Street" by Henry Barraud, 1848. The bust is of Colonel Peter Hawker.

William Bishop (1797 – 16 March 1871) nicknamed as the Bishop of Bond Street was a gun dealer on New Bond Street, London, who served as an agent for the gunsmith Westley Richards. He was responsible for popularising guns as a very successful gun seller and a promoter of sport shooting.

== Biography ==
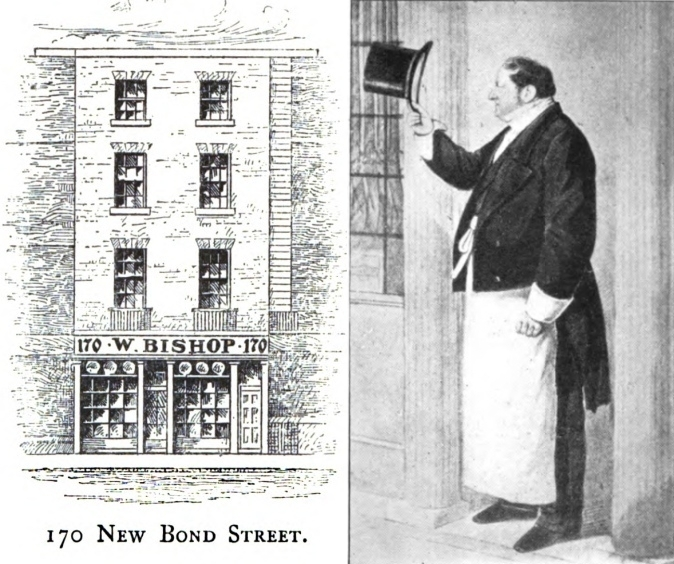

Bishop was born in Ealing and became a goldsmith and later served as an agent for Westley Richards. His shop which was at 170 Bond Street grew into a well-known establishment. Known for wearing a top hat indoors and for his charismatic manners he came to be called the "Bishop of Bond Street". George Teasdale-Buckell described him as: "A large and roomy man, old Bishop, sitting in front of the old white mantelpiece … his gouty leg up on a chair before him. Dressed from head to foot in the blackest of black, a huge white frill proceeding from his breast, and an enormous pair of shirt cuffs turned back over his coat sleeves, and a neatly brimmed hat, which no mortal eye had ever seen off his head. A truly right reverend and Episcopal figure.."

Bishop kept several pet dogs and when one of his dogs named Tiny was stolen he was angry to learn that a man could be jailed for stealing a dog collar but not a dog. He then helped create legislation to criminalise the theft of a dog and the Dog Stealing Act 1845 (8 & 9 Vict. c. 47) came to be called the Bishop's Act. He had a marble monument made when Tiny died.

In 1861 the census noted him as a widower living with three servants above his shop. Upon his death, his estate was valued at £10,000.
