= Marozi =

Type of spotted big cat

The marozi is a name given to a type of a felid similar to a lion but with leopard-like spots, which was sighted in Kenya in the early 20th century. Skins of hunted specimens fitting the description do exist, but have not been sufficient for biologists to come to any definite conclusion regarding the identity of the animal. Though various cryptozoological theories have been advanced, a single book published in 1963 claims that the general consensus at the time was that the marozi represented a colour morph of some known subspecies of lion, perhaps involving individuals that retained juvenile spots into adulthood.

== Claims ==
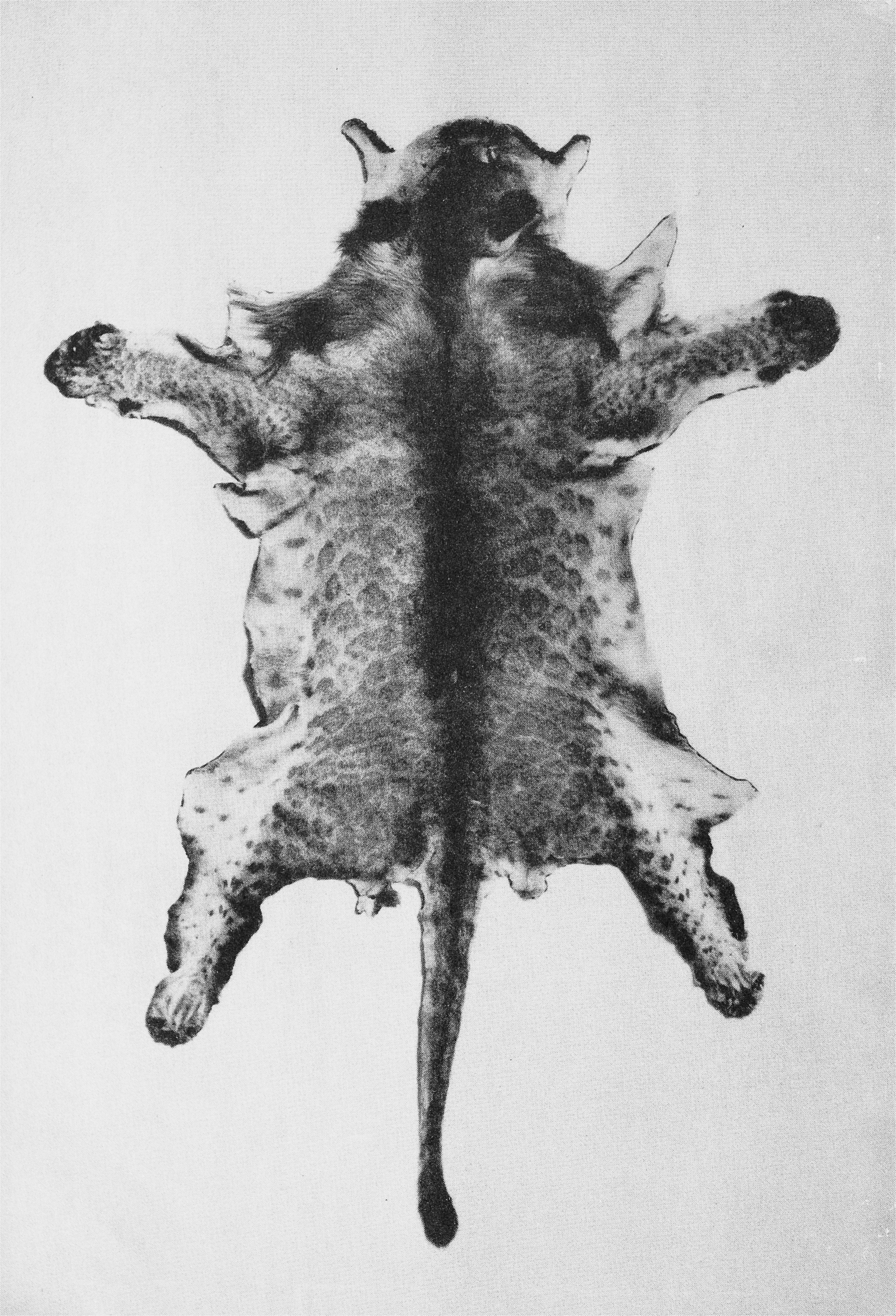
Pelt of a cat alleged to be a marozi, killed by Michael Trent in 1931

Though there were local East African legends of spotted lions, the first sighting documented by Westerners was from Colonel Richard Meinertzhagen in 1903, who discussed seeing dark lions with rosette-like markings in the mountains of Kenya. Meinertzhagen had previously heard of the spotted lions, but may not have taken these reports very seriously.

Another incident was in 1931, when a white farmer, Michael Trent, shot and killed two individuals, a male and a female, in the Aberdare mountains at an elevation of 10,000 feet (3,000 m). The unusual spotted markings on what seemed to be somewhat small adult lions prompted interest from the Nairobi Game Department. The two adult lions had possessed prominent spots that are typical only of cubs, and the male lion's mane was insignificant. The department lacked sufficient skeletal evidence to definitively prove the species or age.

Two years later, explorer Kenneth Gandar Dower headed an expedition into the region in an attempt to capture or kill more specimens. He returned with only circumstantial evidence: three sets of tracks found at a similar elevation as Trent's lions (10,000–12,500 feet or 3,000–3,800 metres). They were believed to have been left by individuals that were tracking a herd of buffalo during a hunt, ruling out the possibility that the animals in question were cubs. Dower noted that while some lions did retain their rosettes into adulthood, such known specimens did not feature these traits with the same degree of prominence as those exhibited on the anomalous pelts.

There were other sightings around the same time:

- Four animals were sighted by Game Warden Captain R. E. Dent in the Aberdare Mountain region at an elevation of 10,000 feet (3,000 m).
- A pair was sighted on the Kinangop Plateau by G. Hamilton-Snowball at an elevation of 11,500 feet (3,500 m). An attempt was made to shoot the animals, but they escaped.

The presence of lions at an altitude that is atypical for the species also suggested the possibility of a distinct population.

== Skepticism ==
In 1950, The Field published a discourse by W. Robert Foran, who was skeptical of the existence of a new race or subspecies of lion. He favoured the hypothesis that a small group of Somali lions (taxonomized at the time as Panthera leo somalica) — including aberrant spotted individuals — had migrated into the Kenyan Aberdare Range. Author Noel Simon commented in 1962 that the consensus of opinion about sightings of marozi is that they are "plains lions which have retained their cub spots into adult life".

In 1963, zoologist Charles Albert Walter Guggisberg claimed that there is no reliable evidence for the marozi as a distinct variety of lion, saying, "...to this day nobody has been able to produce any proof of its existence. In East African lions the juvenile markings do not fade for quite a number of years, and I myself have seen two-year-old lions on the Athi Plains, showing just about the same rosettes as can be seen on the famous skins from the Aberdares."

== See also ==
- Panthera hybrid
