= James H. Sutherland =

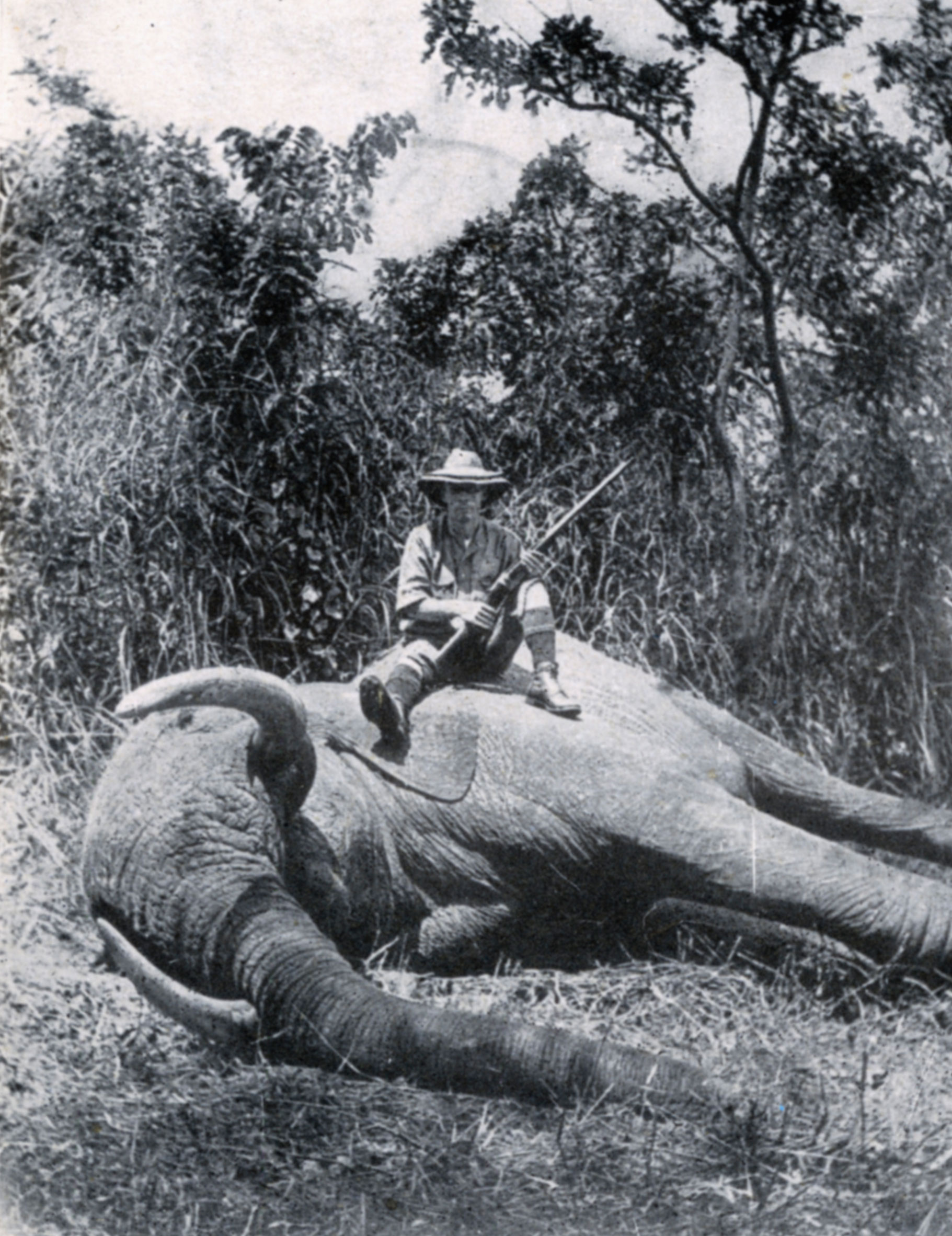
- Sutherland with elephant
- Born: 1872; Scotland
- Died: 26 June 1932 (aged 59–60); Yuba, Anglo-Egyptian Sudan
- Other name: Jim
- Occupation: Elephant hunter
- Years active: 1899–1932
- Notable work: The Adventures Of An Elephant Hunter
- Military career
- Allegiance: German East Africa; British Empire
- Branch: British Army
- Service years: 1905–1906 (Maji Maji Rebellion); 1914–1918 (First World War)
- Rank: Captain
- Awards: Iron Cross; Légion d'Honneur

James H. "Jim" Sutherland (1872 – 26 June 1932) was a Scottish-born soldier and professional hunter, who shot between 1,300 and 1,600 elephants in his life.

== Biography ==
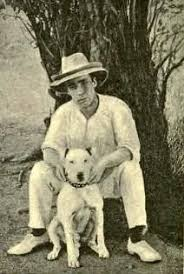
Sutherland with his bull terrier.

=== Early years ===
Sutherland arrived in Cape Town in 1896 at the age of 24, with no fixed ideas of a career. Initially he engaged in various occupations in Johannesburg, Mafeking, Matabeleland, Lake Tanganyika and the Congo, including professional boxing, running African trading stores, and working as a labour overseer on the construction of the Beira-Mashonaland railway. On the outbreak of the Anglo Boer War in 1899, he moved into the African hinterland to hunt elephant professionally.

=== Professional hunter ===
In 1904 Sutherland moved into German East Africa, where he hunted for the next decade. From 1905 to 1906 he became involved in the Maji Maji Rebellion, fought with German colonial forces, and was awarded the Iron Cross for his conduct. In 1912, Sutherland met his lifelong friend Major G.H. "Andy" Anderson, who Sutherland introduced to elephant hunting. The same year, Sutherland published an account of his exploits to that date, The Adventures Of An Elephant Hunter. Upon his arrival in London in 1913, he was feted as the "World's Greatest Elephant Hunter".

=== Military service ===
In 1914, at the outbreak of World War I, Sutherland was hunting in German East Africa. The German authorities attempted to detain him but, by making a detour of 500 miles (800 km), Sutherland made his way through Portuguese East Africa to Nyasaland, where upon arrival he was engaged by the governor as an intelligence officer.

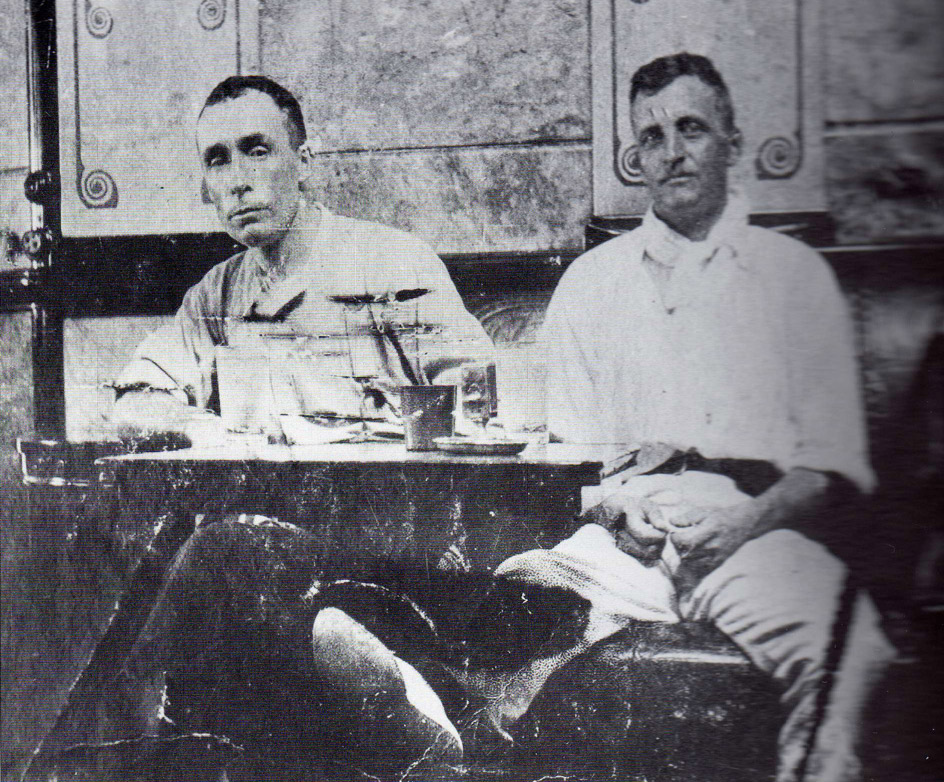
Sutherland with Major G.H. "Andy" Anderson.

In June 1915, Sutherland was severely wounded by a German sniper who shot him in the abdomen with an explosive bullet. After the conquest of German East Africa, Sutherland was made chief intelligence officer and provost marshal on Brigadier-General Norley's staff with the rank of lieutenant, and in 1916 he was promoted to captain. Sutherland was mentioned in dispatches on several occasions and was awarded the Légion d'Honneur for his services as a special guide to the Nyasaland Field Force.

=== Return to hunting and death ===
After the war, Sutherland hunted in Uganda, the Belgian Congo, and the French Congo. In 1929, Sutherland fell victim to a conspiracy by the Azande tribe against white people, and was poisoned. He recovered and continued to hunt, despite being partially paralyzed. Eventually Sutherland died from the poison's effects in the Yubo Sleeping Sickness Camp on 26 June 1932, and in his will he bequeathed all of his property to Major Anderson. Sutherland was buried near Yubo, and his friends later erected a bronze tablet on the spot, engraved with two elephants standing beneath a palm tree, which reads in part:

To the Memory of that great elephant Hunter – JIM SUTHERLAND.

== Hunting preferences and records ==
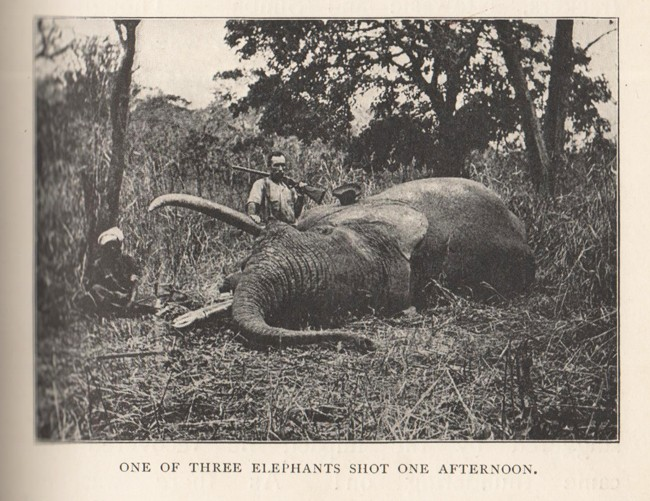
Plate from The Adventures Of An Elephant Hunter.

Over the course of his life, Sutherland shot between 1,300 and 1,600 elephants. In The Adventures Of An Elephant Hunter, Sutherland describes two very close encounters with elephants and one with a buffalo. On one occasion an elephant hurled him into the air and he landed on its back, holding on for dear life he managed to grab an overhanging branch, drop to the ground then, once he had recovered his rifle, follow up and kill the elephant. In The Adventures Of An Elephant Hunter, the largest pair of tusks Sutherland describes from the one elephant he shot weighed 152 pounds (69 kg) and 137 pounds (62 kg), whilst the second largest pair weighed 145 pounds (66 kg) and 140 pounds (64 kg). Later, in 1929, Sutherland shot an enormous tusker in the French Congo whose tusks weighed 207 pounds (94 kg) and 205 pounds (93 kg).

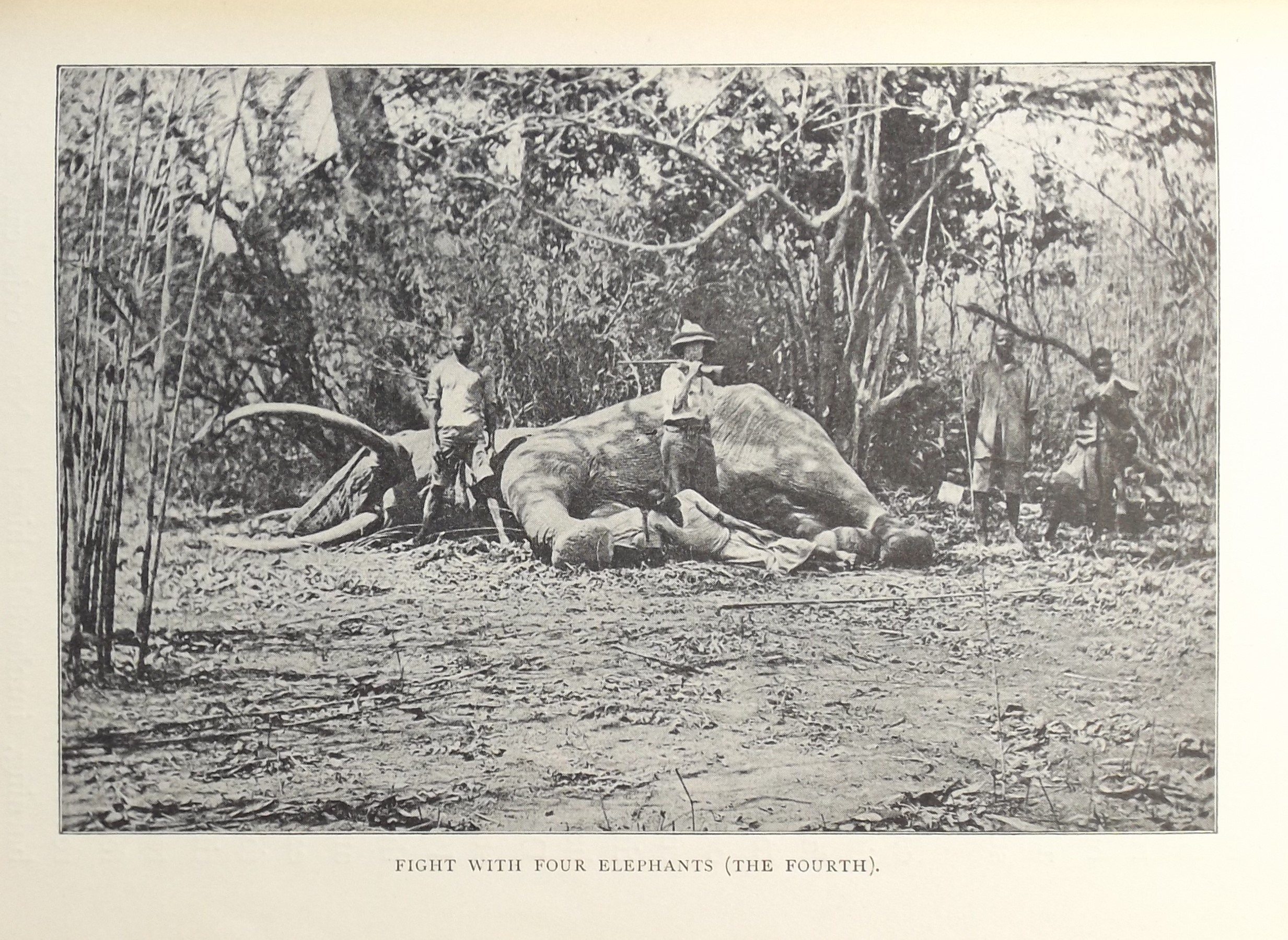
Plate from The Adventures Of An Elephant Hunter.

Sutherland hunted with rifles in various calibres including .303 British, 10.75 x 68mm Mauser, .450 Nitro Express and .500 Nitro Express. Unlike "Karamojo" Bell, Sutherland preferred a heavy calibre rifle for elephant and rhinoceros hunting, stating "I find the most effective to be the double .577 with a 750 grain bullet and a charge of axite powder equivalent to a hundred grains of cordite." Sutherland's eventual battery was a Westley Richards single-trigger Droplock .577 Nitro Express double rifle, along with a bolt-action .318 Westley Richards, which he used in open country where the quarry was difficult to approach and long shots were required.

== Bibliography ==
- The Adventures Of An Elephant Hunter, Macmillan, London, 1912.

== See also ==
- List of famous big game hunters
- W. D. M. "Karamojo" Bell
- P. C. "Pete" Pearson
- R. J. D. "Samaki" Salmon
