= W. D. M. Bell =

Scottish adventurer, soldier, and fighter pilot

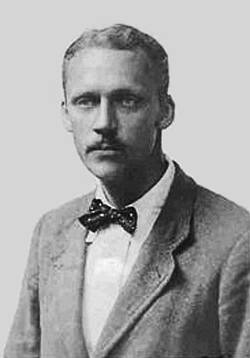
- Bell's photograph for his pilot's license, 1915
- Born: Walter Dalrymple Maitland Bell; 8 September 1880; Clifton Hall near Edinburgh
- Died: 30 June 1954 (aged 73); Corriemoillie, Garve, Ross-shire
- Citizenship: United Kingdom
- Occupations: big game hunter, adventurer, soldier, and aviator
- Writing career
- Pen name: Karamojo Bell
- Genres: autobiography, travel, adventure

Walter Dalrymple Maitland Bell (8 September 1880 – 30 June 1954), known as Karamojo Bell after the Karamoja sub-region in Uganda, which he travelled extensively, was a Scottish adventurer, big game hunter in East Africa, soldier, decorated fighter pilot, sailor, writer, and painter.

Famous as one of the most successful ivory hunters of his time, Bell was an advocate of accurate shot placement with smaller calibre rifles, over the heavy large-bore rifles his contemporaries used for big African game.

He improved his hunting skills by the dissection and study of the skulls of elephants he shot. He perfected a technique of shooting elephants from an extremely difficult position, diagonally behind the target; this became known as the 'Bell Shot'.

Although chiefly known for his exploits in Africa, Bell also travelled to North America and New Zealand, sailed windjammers, saw service in South Africa during the Boer War, and flew in the Royal Flying Corps in East Africa, Greece, and France during the First World War.

== Early life ==
Bell was born into a wealthy family of Scottish and Manx ancestry, on the family's estate named Clifton Hall, (today a school) in Linlithgowshire, near Edinburgh in 1880. Walter was the second-youngest of eight children. His mother died when he was two years old and his father died when he was six. His father Robert Bell owned a successful business in coal and shale oil and the Bell family resided in their stately home near Broxburn, as well as owning the surrounding estate and other country properties.

He was brought up by his elder brothers but ran away from several schools, and he once hit his school captain over the head with a cricket bat. At the age of 13 he went to sea, and in 1896, at the age of 16, hunted lions for the Uganda Railway using a single-shot rifle chambered in .303 British.

== Yukon gold and the Boer War ==
Bell convinced his family to back him for a trip to Africa, where he obtained a job shooting man-eating lions for the Uganda Railway at the age of 16. In 1896, Bell travelled to North America, where he spent a short time panning for gold in the Yukon gold rush and earned a living by shooting game to supply Dawson City with meat. After a winter of shooting moose and bear with a .350 Farquharson single-shot and a .45 Colt, his partner cheated him of his earnings, leaving him nearly penniless. He sold his rifle for enough money to get back to Dawson. In order to return to Africa he joined the Canadian Mounted Rifles, seeing service during the Boer War. Bell was captured when his horse was shot from under him, but he escaped and managed to get back to British lines; upon doing that he was made a scout.

== Big game hunter ==
After the Boer war ended in 1902, Bell remained in Africa, becoming a professional elephant hunter. Over sixteen years spent in Africa, he hunted elephants for their ivory in Kenya, Uganda, Ethiopia, Sudan, the Lado Enclave, French Ivory Coast, Liberia, French Congo, and the Belgian Congo.

He became known as "Karamojo" Bell (sometimes spelt Karamoja) because of his safaris through this remote wilderness area in North Eastern Uganda.

Bell shot 1,011 elephants during his career; all of them bulls apart from 28 cows. He is noted for using smaller calibre bullets rather than the heavy recoiling, larger calibre bullets that were popular with other big game hunters.

Like many other professional elephant hunters of the time, he started hunting elephants with a sporting .303 Lee–Enfield rifle, taking 63 elephant heads on his first safari. Later he outfitted himself for extensive hunting safaris in the Karamojo region of Uganda, preferring the .275 7×57mm Mauser/.275 chambered in a Rigby-Mauser rifle, which he acquired from London gunmaker John Rigby & Company. Around 800 of his elephant kills were made with 7mm Mauser rifles, using the 1893 pattern standard military 11.2-gram (172.8 gr) grain round-nosed full metal jacket load.

Bell preferred smaller calibers because they recoiled less, were lighter to carry, and in his estimation killed elephants just as well as the bigger bore cartridges. Bell found that German 7x57 and English .303 military ammunition was the most reliable, which also encouraged him to use the smaller calibers. Other than his 7x57 rifles with which he shot the majority of his elephants, he also used a 'wand-like' Mannlicher–Schoenauer 6.5×54mm carbine, which he abandoned due to failure of the available ammunition, a Lee–Enfield sporting rifle in .303 British and Mauser rifles chambered in .318 Westley Richards.

He disliked the double rifles considered archetypal for the African hunting of his time due to what he considered recoil so heavy as to be detrimental to accuracy, their delicacy in the field, their weight, and the unreliable sporting ammunition of the day.

He particularly praised a Mannlicher M1893 sporting rifle chambered in 6.5×53mmR from George Gibbs that he used for most of his buck meat hunting in the Karamojo.. On one occasion in West Africa in the midst of a famine he killed a herd of 23 forest buffalo using a .22 Savage Hi-Power rifle with lung shots, in order to feed a local villagers who were starving.

Bell used the brain shot on elephants extensively, after sawing an elephant skull in half in order to ascertain exactly where the brain lay inside the head. The brain shot did not disturb the herd as much when the elephants were killed instantly, whereas body shots would mean the animals would run and upset the rest, causing them to stampede. With the brain shot he was able to shoot several animals before the herd became restless or took flight. He mastered an oblique shot from the rear on fleeing elephants, which was angled through the neck muscles and into the brain. This difficult shot has become known as "The Bell Shot" on elephants.

After the First World War, he began to use the .318 Westley Richards calibre almost exclusively, observing his 'inexplicable misses' then stopped.

In all WDM Bell shot elephants with the following cartridges: 6.5x54 Mannlicher, 7x57 Mauser (.275), .303 British, .318 Westley Richards, .350 Rigby Magnum, .416 Rigby and .450/400.

The most elephants he shot in one day was 19. The most bull elephants killed for their ivory in one month was 44. The largest amount of money made from ivory taken in a single day was 863 pounds sterling. He wore out 24 pairs of boots in a year and estimated that for every bull taken, he had walked an average of 73 miles (117 km).

Bell has become famous for his superb marksmanship. He was once witnessed shooting fish jumping from the surface of a lake, and he wrote of shooting flying birds out of the sky with his .318 Westley Richards rifle, in order to use up a batch of faulty ammunition.

In addition to elephants, Bell had to supply his African porters and their families with meat and also hides - for their own use and also to trade for other supplies from the local peoples. He shot over 800 cape buffalo with his small calibre rifles, as well as countless other plains game, including rhinoceroses and lions. Bell preserved a good working relationship with the native African peoples where he hunted, trading cattle for information as to where he could find good numbers of bull elephants. He believed that this co-operation with the local tribes was the main reason for his great success as an elephant hunter. He hunted in the warlike Karamojo area for five years without the killing of a single African in self-defence becoming necessary.

One of Bell's closest African companions while hunting the Karamojo region was a Karamojoan named Payale, a member of a local tribe. They hunted together over several safaris in the region, and Bell accorded him great respect. Another of Bell's hunting companions was New Zealander Harry Rayne, who accompanied him on a safari to Sudan and the Karamojo in 1907, and who later became District Commissioner in British Somaliland. Bell was also a lifelong friend of the American hunter Gerrit Forbes, a cousin of Franklin D. Roosevelt who accompanied him on three safaris for elephants between 1907 and 1913. He was also a personal friend of American gunwriter Townsend Whelen.

Bell was one of the so-called "gentlemen adventurers" that "poached" the lawless Lado Enclave after Belgium withdrew from the region following the death of Leopold the Second in 1909, and prior to the territory becoming part of Sudan. Bell himself was already hunting in the Lado with a legal license from the Belgians when Leopold died, and was not poaching.

In the Karamojo Bell carried a Mauser C96, equipped with a shoulder stock and chambered in 9mm Mauser Export calibre, which although never used against human targets, he "kept them dodging for 400 or 500 yards" according to Bell.

== First World War ==
At the outbreak of the First World War, Bell was hunting in the French Congo, but immediately returned to England and began to learn to fly. He enlisted in the Royal Flying Corps, becoming a reconnaissance pilot in Tanganyika (present day Tanzania). It is reported that in the early days he sometimes flew without an observer so that he could take pot-shots at the enemy with his hunting rifle. Later, he became a Flight Commander in Europe, flying Bristol Fighters.

Bell was the first in his squadron (No. 47) to score an air victory when he shot down a German two-seater aircraft over Salonika on 23 December 1916. He shot down a German Albatross fighter with a single shot, after which his machine gun jammed, and once shot an aircraft down with a machine gun that did not have its sights aligned with the bore. With his observer Lieutenant Robert Mainwaring Wynne-Eyton, Captain Bell shot down a French SPAD by mistake, although the French pilot survived unscathed.

Bell was mentioned in dispatches for the first time in 1916. By the end of the war he had received this distinction five times. He was awarded the Military Cross in June 1916 which was presented by General Smuts, and received a bar to his MC for service in Greece and France. Bell was discharged in April 1918 for medical reasons (stated on his discharge papers as 'nervous asthma') and was permitted to retain his rank of captain.

== Later years ==
After a period of time recuperating from illnesses contracted during the war, he returned to elephant hunting, shooting in Liberia, on the Ivory Coast, and travelling far inland by canoe, making a trip of 3,000 miles in 1921. On this expedition he was joined by his comrade from the Royal Flying Corps, R. M. Wynne-Eyton. His last safari was an automobile expedition through the Sudan and Chad with Americans Gerrit and Malcolm Forbes, of which he later remarked that 'little hunting was done'. Rather the aim was to travel as far and as fast as possible with the vehicles. After this expedition Bell did not return to Africa. Although he intended to travel by air to Uganda for a last elephant hunt in 1939, his plans were interrupted by the start of the Second World War.

Bell retired to his 1,000-acre highland estate at Garve in Ross-shire, Scotland, named 'Corriemoillie', with his wife Katie (daughter of Sir Ernest and Lady Soares) to whom he had become engaged during the First World War. He published two books about his exploits in Africa, illustrated with his own sketches and paintings. 'Wanderings of an Elephant Hunter', which was serialised in Britain's Country Life magazine, 'Karamojo Safari', and several articles about aspects of shooting and firearms in the NRA's American Rifleman in the USA. His third book, Bell of Africa, was published posthumously.

Bell and his wife Katie spent their later years sailing competitively. They commissioned the first steel-hulled racing yacht, Trenchmere (37 tons), in Scotland in 1934 and sailed her in transatlantic ocean racing until the outbreak of the Second World War. He also stalked red stags in the Scottish hills with a Winchester Model 70 chambered in the .220 Swift cartridge, (the first of its kind in the U.K.) of which he wrote articles describing its superior effect on deer due to the high velocity of the bullet.

After suffering from a heart attack in 1947 which limited his activities, Bell spent his last years on his estate. Only a few days after posting the manuscript for his last book, Bell of Africa, Bell died of heart failure on 30 June 1954.

== Marriage ==
On January 15, 1919, he married Kate Rose Mary Soares (b. 1894 d.1958), sole daughter and heiress of Sir Ernest Soares (1864–1926), of 36 Princes Gate, London, and of Upcott House in the parish of Pilton, North Devon, a solicitor and Liberal Party Member of Parliament.

== Bibliography ==
- The Wanderings of an Elephant Hunter (1923)
- Karamojo Safari (1949)
- Bell of Africa (1960)
- Reminiscences of an Elephant Hunter (2015)
- Incidents from an Elephant Hunter's Diary (2015)

== See also ==
- List of famous big-game hunters
- Pete Pearson
- R. J. D. "Samaki" Salmon
- James H. Sutherland
