= Sustainable hunting =

Sustainable hunting is a conservation-based hunting approach that does not reduce the density of the game animal being hunted via the adherence to hunting limits. Sustainable hunting is a method of hunting that focuses on not degrading the environment and using fees related to hunting for conservation purposes to instead protect and help the environment flourish. This concept is supposed to be a more sustainable and less invasive form of hunting as it aims to preserve or even improve the environment where unregulated hunting can destroy and even cause species to go extinct when left unchecked.

In order for hunting to be sustainable, hunting laws and limits must be followed. Species that are vulnerable or endangered must be protected, as taking from their population can be detrimental. Once the level of removal reaches a level higher than the population can reproduce, then the extraction of species in that area is no longer sustainable as, over time, the numbers will dwindle. Certain precautions need to be taken in regard to species that do not reproduce as fast; one such precaution is allowing the animal to be hunted once it has reached an age where it can no longer reproduce. Utilizing hunting and its associated fees to generate conservation revenue has proven successful in the past.

Still, due to limited data and issues around ethics, current efforts and other challenges prevent the growth of sustainable hunting as a model. Some troubles with compiling accurate research include subpopulations of species intermixing with other populations and allowing the species to recover where if it were left isolated, its rate of decline would have been too high to be sustained. Methods for sustainable hunting vary, but researchers are looking to find the maximum level of game that can be taken while still being sustainable to reap the most benefits per season.

== History ==
There are multiple influences to the sustainable hunting approach and political meetings that form its history. In the past, the sustainable hunting approach was developed as the North American Model of Wildlife Conservation (NAMWC). The NAMWC was utilized in the Pittman-Robertson Federal Aid in Wildlife Restoration Act of 1937, where revenue generated from a tax on hunting-related equipment such as firearms and ammunition was utilized in conservation efforts. This act propelled conservation efforts and generated millions of dollars towards protecting and developing the environment.

Research in this field is still new, and efforts are currently being made to create better, more sustainable hunting models. The International Union for Conservation of Nature has worked towards bringing sustainable hunting to become more researched and organized. The use of sustainable hunting tools such as targeting older males, use of permits, and hunting seasons were utilized in the Pakistani mountains to prevent the extinction of Afghan Urial and the straight horned markhor in the 1990s to early 2000s.

In the late 1800s, the American Bison population was severely threatened by extinction until a more sustainable approach to their take was developed, which raised populations from the thousands to roughly 350,000. In South Africa, 80% of nature conservation is done on private land, and between the 1990s and 2002, there was a significant increase in cattle ranching land being converted to hunting game ranches.

== Methods ==
Various actions and plans can be taken to make hunting more sustainable. A common practice of most sustainable hunting models includes using monetary value derived from purchases and spending that money back on conservation. Methods regarding what and when animals should and shouldn't be taken are also common, such as hunting outside of breeding seasons, restricting areas that can be hunted, and not hunting premature game.

Selective hunting and implementing hunting seasons are other approaches by which flourishing species can be taken while those with threatened populations are protected. Hunting limits are also an effective measure, as over-harvest will negatively affect the population's density. Studies have shown that it is best when a bundle of these methods are applied to have the greatest effect on growing a population. A method seen in Zambia is the closure of hunting for a short number of years to allow species recovery.

While recovery is often used once the damage has been done, using it as a precautionary measure has proven effective in that estimates of age restrictions and other regulations are not always fully accurate; thus, temporary complete closure accounts for error. Conservation efforts through the use of trophy hunting have been used to grow the white rhinoceros population as a managed hunting system allows for calculated removal from populations, generating revenue without affecting numbers too much. When hunting has no regulation, no money is gained for conservation, and the removal rate is unregulated. With trophy hunting, conservation revenue is made even where ecotourism is not possible.

== Current efforts ==
Sustainability and conservation have been a relatively new focus for the world as environmental changes press forward. Current examples of sustainable hunting and conservation development include collecting more data in a methodical manner to better study policy's effect on populations, as well as the World Wide Fund for Nature measuring the effect of sustainable hunting in Namibia through the Living in a Finite Environment Project. This project worked to develop conservation planning and has been successful in preventing the overexploitation of resources such as locally hunted animals.

In regards to whaling, Japan had put toward conservation efforts until it withdrew from the International Whaling Commission in 2018 due to a shift toward restricted whale hunting compared to sustainable taking. Efforts toward sustainable hunting can stem from the need for local cultures to continue harvesting bushmeat species. The flying fox, for example, is culturally valuable, and as its harvest is unlikely to be stopped, methods of regulating the take can be implemented.

While a sustainable implementation of trophy and sport hunting has improved the numbers of some species, a sustainable modeled management does not always guarantee the growth of the population in targeted species. For instance, despite an aim to increase waterfowl populations in the 1990s and 2000s, the number of species most sought by hunters such as black ducks and mallards continued to fall.

== Challenges ==
There are many obstacles that prevent sustainable hunting from growing into a model where populations would not be negatively affected by hunting. These include issues such as private land, the growth of the human population, and the challenge of creating laws/ regulations that protect multiple species. Political issues regarding indigenous people and those who rely on certain animals for food also pose challenges. Protections that promote sustainable hunting need to be strict enough to effectively regulate commercialized and recreational huntsmen and prevent the populations of game animals from dwindling, but special policies must ensure that those who rely on the animals for a way of life can still survive.

Conflicting views between those who support sustainable hunting and groups like the Humane Society of the United States make ethical considerations another factor when implementing this system. Certain geographical areas, such as parts of Africa, rely on mammals that may be endemic or endangered to the world but are still hunted as the main source of bushmeat to allow human survival. This conflicts with conservation-related hunting practices as the food source needs to be taken regardless of environmental concerns. Other challenges include finding ways of systemizing and measuring data accurately and using it to develop a sustainable hunting model that will for sure be successful. Factors from other human-related environmental pressures, such as urbanization and climate change, make conclusive models hard to calculate.

When sport hunting is implemented as a conservation tool through revenue generation to help the targeted species flourish, the conservation approach itself can have adverse effects. Adverse effects and biodiversity issues have arisen in the case of white-tailed deer in the U.S. from attempts to keep their population numbers high to supply enough game for hunters. The artificially high game numbers then cause environmental damage, showing that the growth of population numbers, often a goal for sustainable hunting models, poses its own challenges.

== See also ==
- Wildlife management
- Game law
- Big-game hunting
