= Baluarte Zoo =

Zoological park in Vigan, Ilocos Sur, Philippines

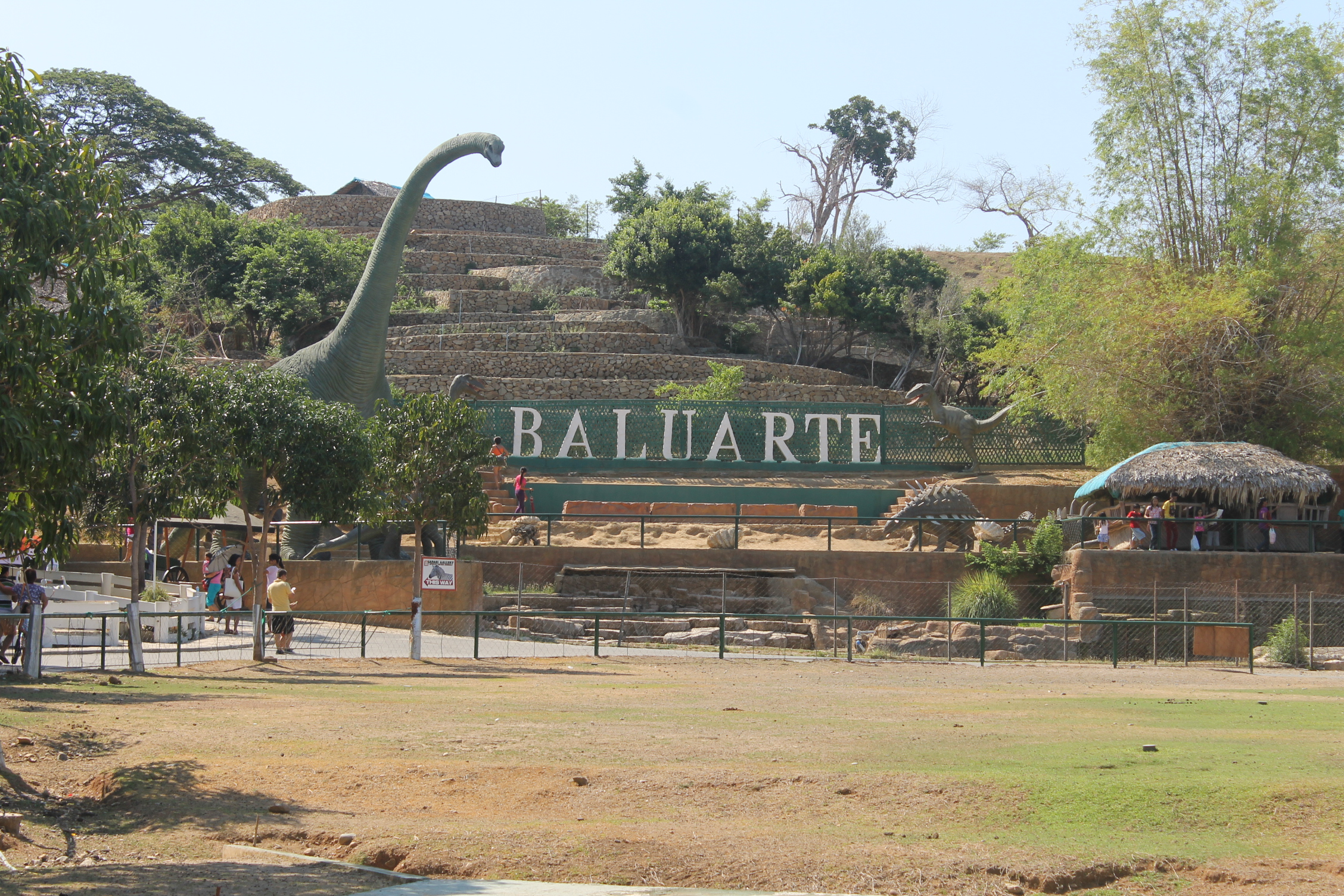
- Baluarte Zoo
- Interactive map of Baluarte Zoo
- 17°33′07″N 120°22′34″E
- Location: Vigan, Ilocos Sur, Philippines
- Major exhibits: Safari Gallery
- Owner: Baluarte Zoo Foundation

Baluarte Zoo is a zoological park in Vigan, Ilocos Sur, Philippines. It was established by politician and businessman, Chavit Singson.

== History ==
The Baluarte Zoo was established by local politician and businessman, Chavit Singson. Initially it was only a rest house for Singson. The site was already known as Baluarte prior to Singson's arrival, which came from the Spanish term for "stronghold" or "fortress".

Singson, who cites his hunting hobby as his motive in setting up Baluarte only considered opening a zoo when his hunting trophy collection grew too big. He thought that a zoo would serve to edify it patrons aside from promoting conservation and protection of endangered species. Described as an interactive wildlife sanctuary, the facility was designed and developed by Singson himself.

Operations were disrupted by the COVID-19 pandemic, but the zoo has since reopened.

In 2024, a zoo employee was dismissed for hitting a lion to make it pose for photographs.

== Features ==
=== Animals in captivity ===
The Baluarte Zoo had various wild animals under captivity. This includes ostriches, Bengal tigers and lions. The zoo also has a butterfly sanctuary.

=== Safari Gallery ===
The Safari Gallery is a trophy room which features the preserved remains of animals Chavit Singson personally hunted and killed in various parts of the world. Singson intended the gallery for people of Ilocos so they could see exotic animals without going to Manila or outside the country.

== Gallery ==
Camels at the zoo

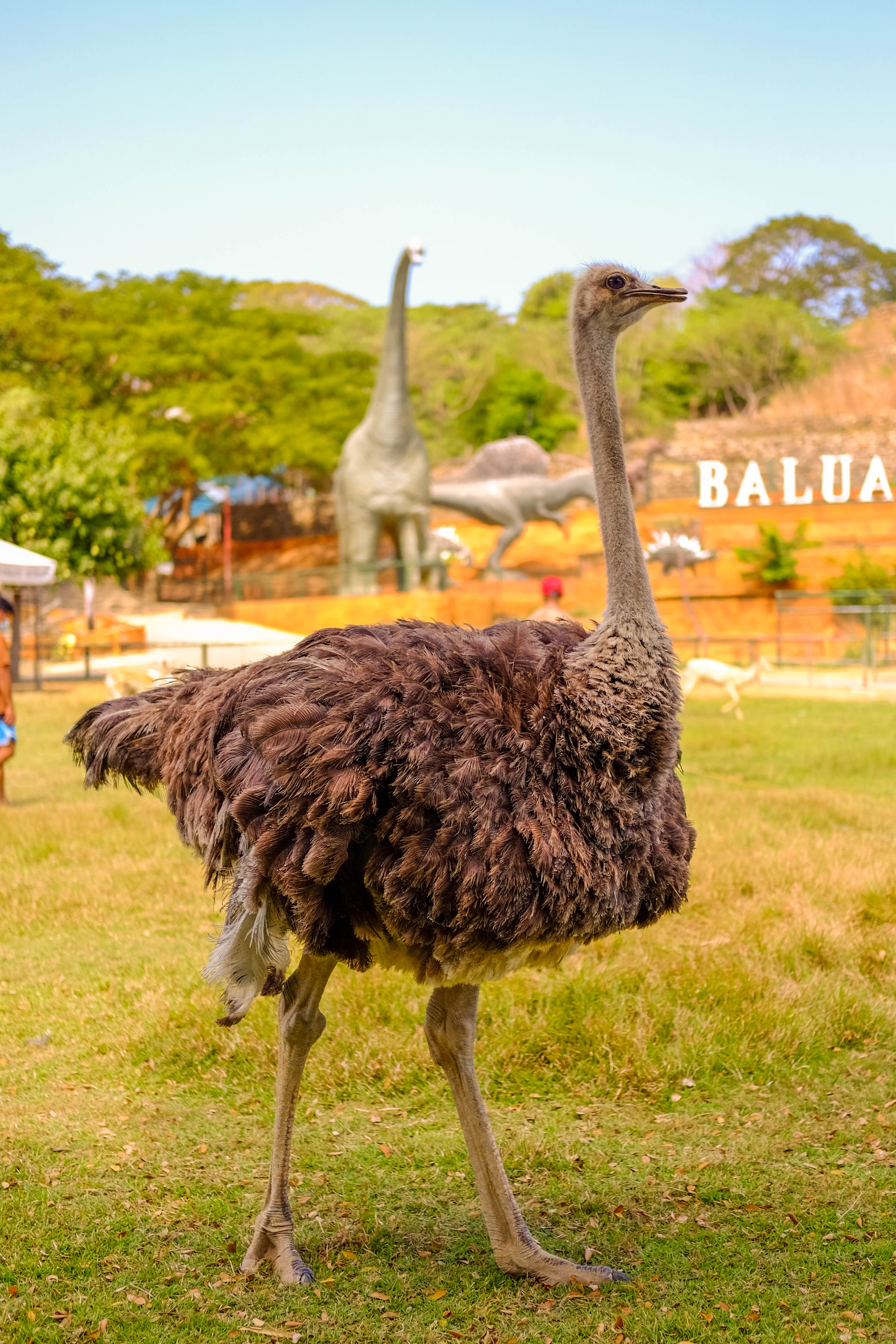
An ostrich

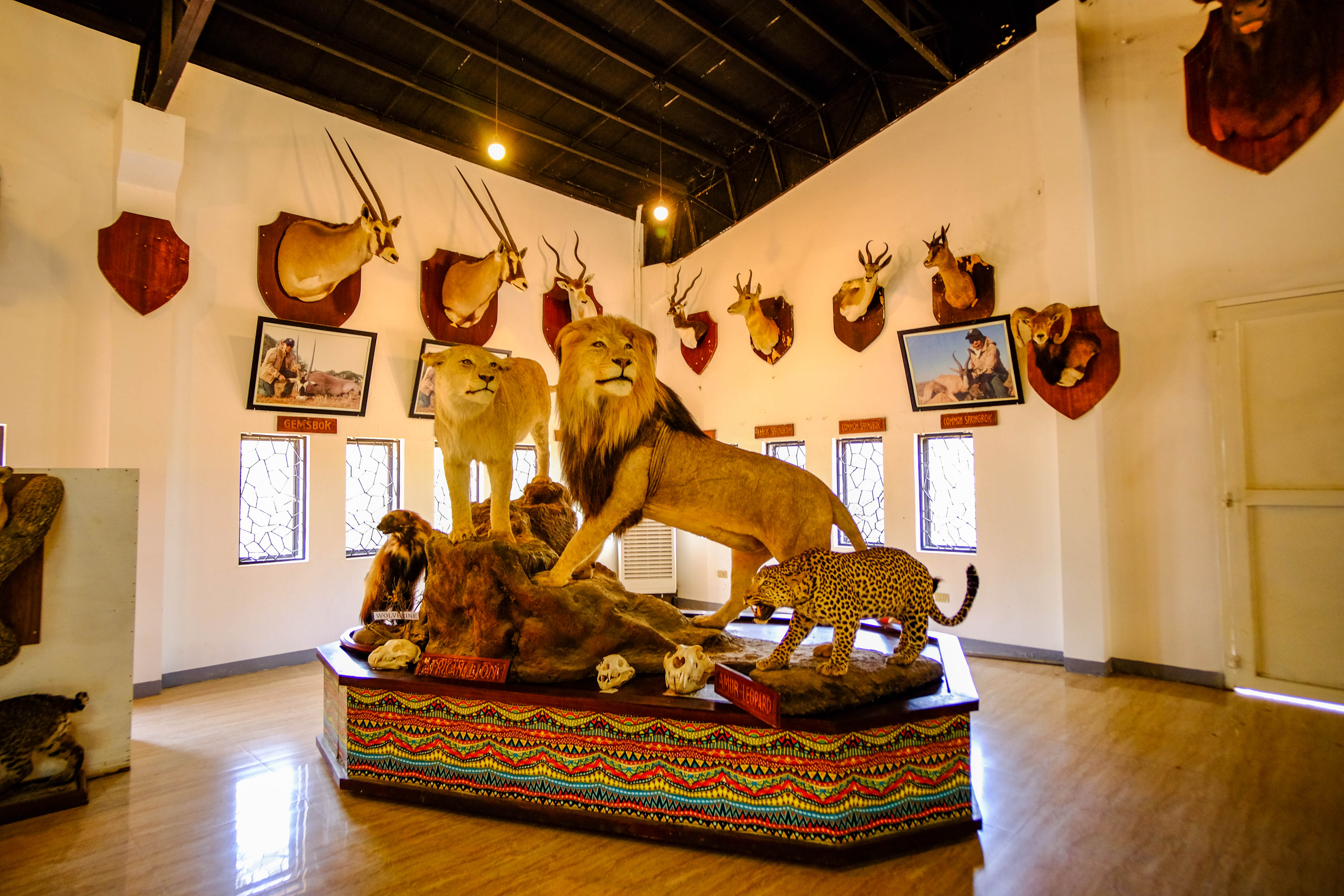
Trophy room

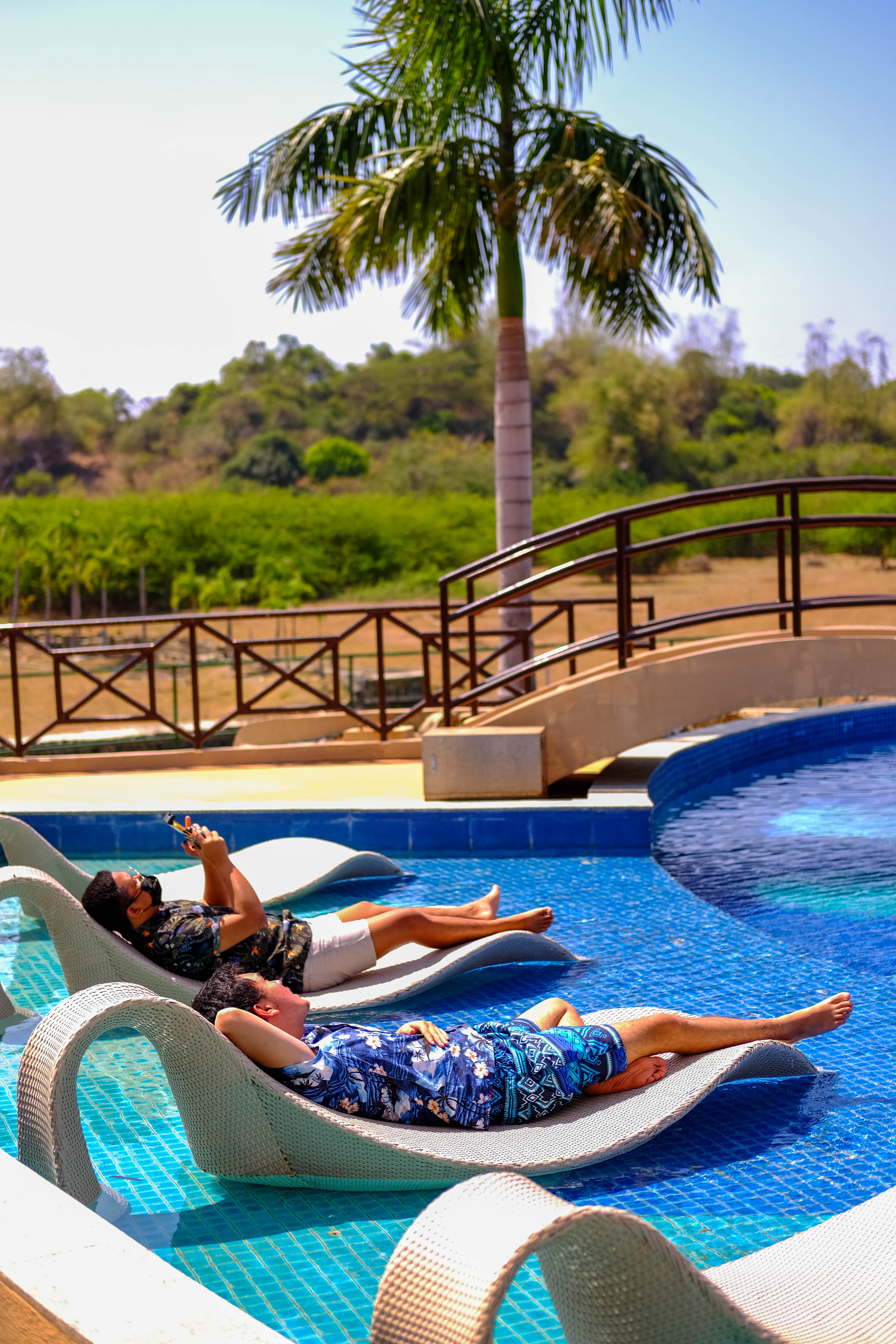
Poolside
