= Cornish–Windsor Covered Bridge =

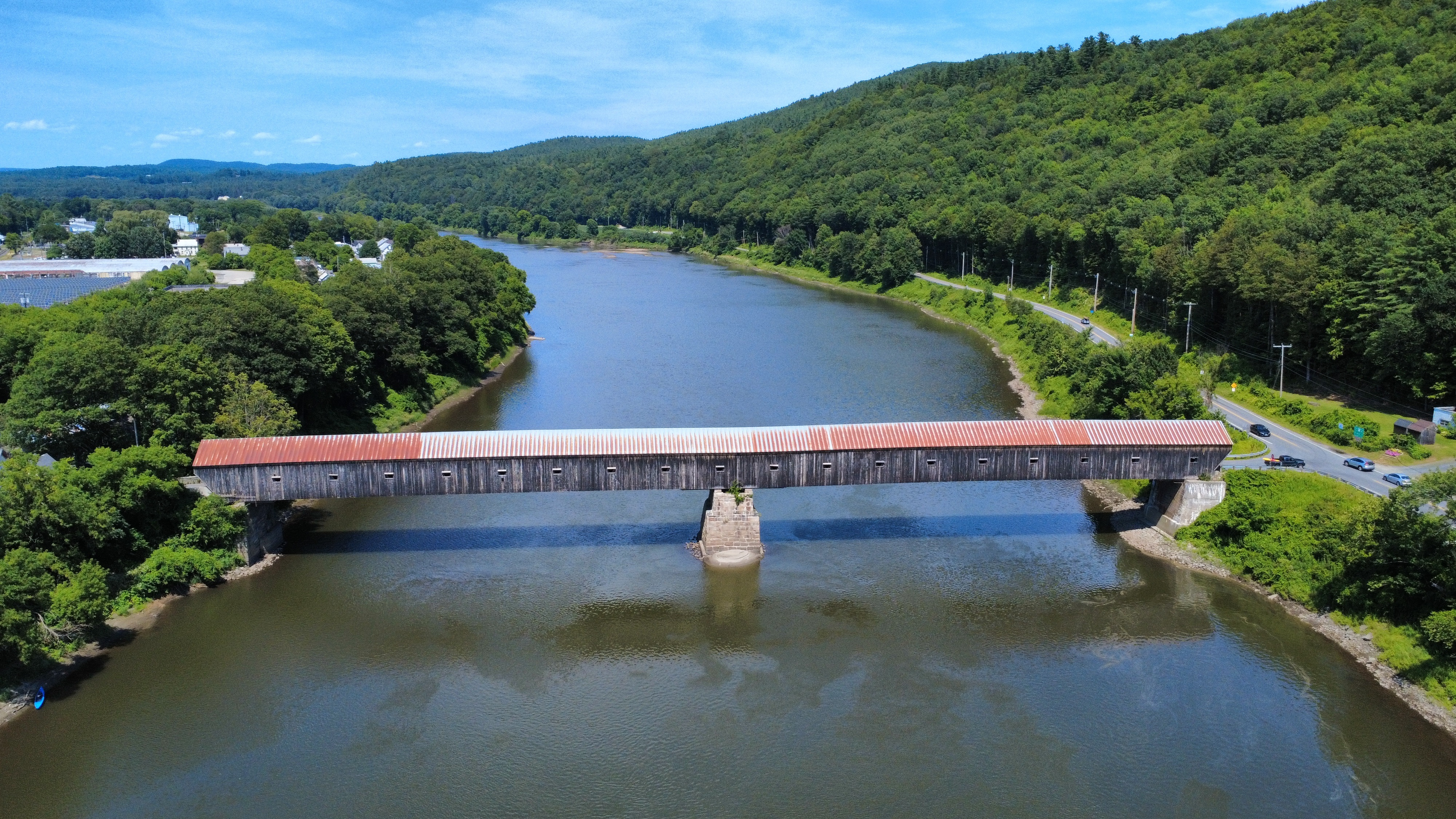
- Cornish-Windsor Covered Bridge, viewed from the south
- Coordinates: 43°28′26″N 72°23′02″W
- Crosses: Connecticut River
- Locale: Cornish, New Hampshire to Windsor, Vermont
- Maintained by: New Hampshire Department of Transportation

Characteristics
- Design: Town lattice truss bridge
- Material: Wood
- Total length: 449 feet 5 inches (136.98 m)
- Width: 24 feet (7.3 m)
- Longest span: 204 feet (62 m)
- Load limit: 10 short tons (9.1 t)
- Clearance below: 12 feet 9 inches (3.89 m)

History
- Construction end: 1866
- Cornish–Windsor Covered Bridge
- U.S. National Register of Historic Places
- Location within New Hampshire Location within the United States
- Nearest city: Windsor, VT
- Built: 1866
- NRHP reference No.: 76000135
- Added to NRHP: November 21, 1976

Location
- Interactive map of Cornish–Windsor Covered Bridge

The Cornish–Windsor Covered Bridge is a 160-year-old, two-span, timber Town lattice-truss, interstate, covered bridge that crosses the Connecticut River between Cornish, New Hampshire (on the east), and Windsor, Vermont (on the west). Until 2008, when the Smolen–Gulf Bridge opened in Ohio, it had been the longest covered bridge (still standing) in the United States.

== History ==
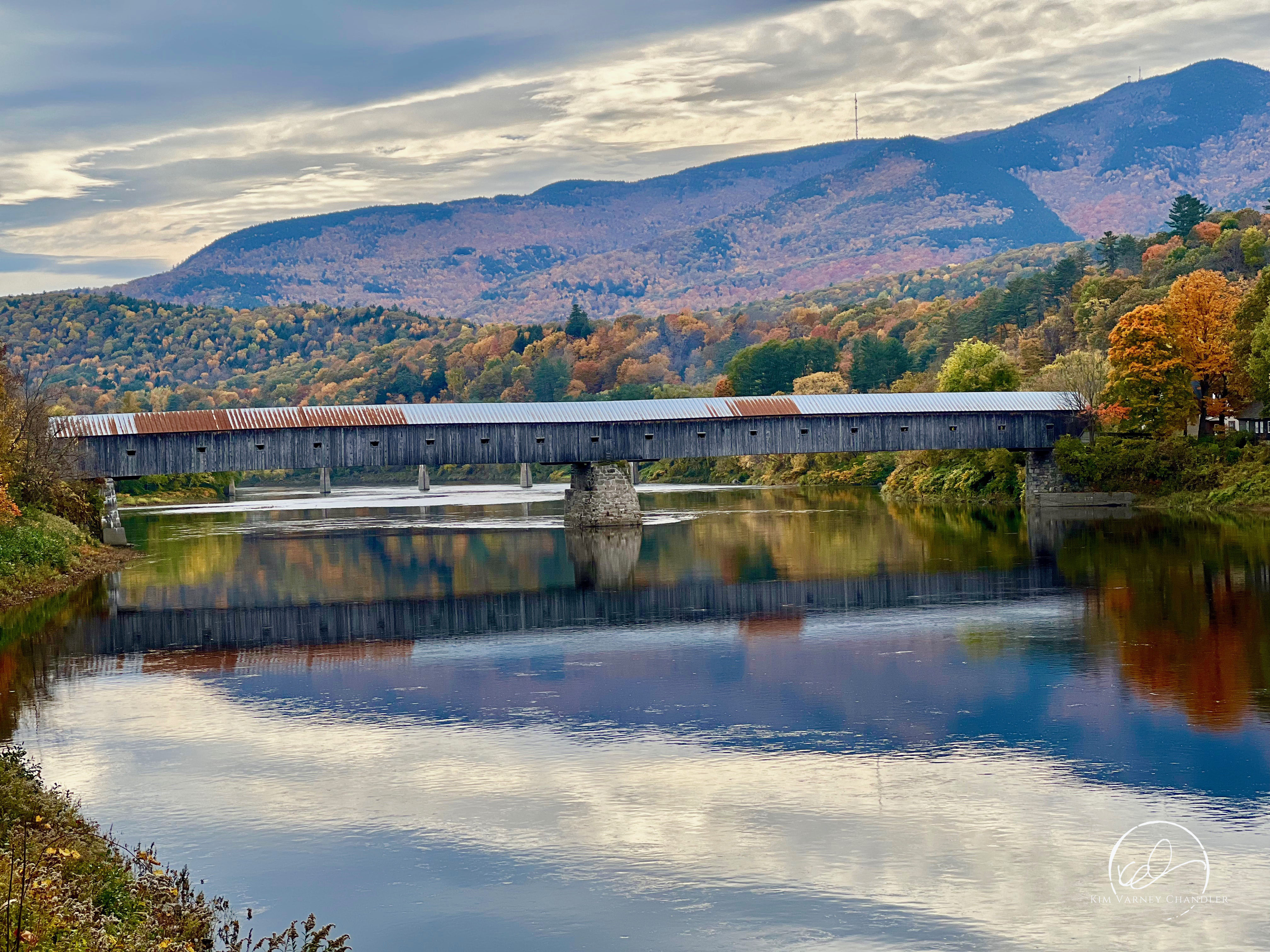
Cornish-Windsor Bridge with Mount Ascutney visible in the background

=== Previous bridges ===
There were three bridges previously built on this site—one each in 1796, 1824 and 1828. The 1824 and 1828 spans were constructed and operated by a group of businessmen which included Allen Wardner (1786–1877).

=== 1866 bridge (current) ===
The current bridge was built in 1866 by Bela Jenks Fletcher (1811–1877) of Claremont and James Frederick Tasker (1826–1903) of Cornish at a cost of $9,000 (equivalent to $197,898 in 2025). The bridge is approximately 449 feet (137 m) long and 24 feet (7 m) wide. The structure uses a lattice truss patented in 1820 and 1835 by Ithiel Town (1784–1844).

From 1866 through 1943, it operated as a toll bridge. According to a 1966 report by the New Hampshire Division of Economic Development, the bridge was plenty long enough to earn the name "kissin' bridge", a vernacular of covered bridges referring to the brief moment of relative privacy while crossing.

[In 1866] It connected 'temperance' Windsor with 'wet' Cornish, so authorities asked 2 cents for foot travelers to enter New Hampshire but upped the fee to 3 cents for the return to dry Windsor.

— Boston Globe (1966)

Other tolls, in 1866, ran as high as 20 cents (equivalent to $4 in 2025) for a four-horse carriage.

The span was purchased by the state of New Hampshire in 1936 and became toll-free in 1943.

==== Landmark designation and restoration ====
- 1970: The American Society of Civil Engineers (ASCE) designated the bridge a National Historic Civil Engineering Landmark.
- 1976: The bridge was listed in the National Register of Historic Places.
- 1988: The Cornish–Windsor Covered Bridge was rehabilitated, funded by the Federal Highway Administration.

=== Clarification of "longest bridge" status ===
While the Old Blenheim Bridge had and Bridgeport Covered Bridge has longer clear spans, and the Smolen–Gulf Bridge is longer overall, with a longest single span of 204 feet (62 m), the Cornish–Windsor Bridge is still the longest wooden covered bridge and has the longest single covered span to carry automobile traffic. (Blenheim was and Bridgeport is pedestrian only.) The Hartland Bridge in Hartland, New Brunswick, is longer than the Cornish-Windsor Bridge, and is currently open, but the claim that Cornish-Windsor was the longest was made when the Hartland was closed.

=== Access ===
==== From Vermont ====
Vermont Route 44 in Windsor heading southeast, ends at Main Street. (Main Street is also US 5 and VT 12.) Continuing past Main, the road becomes Bridge Street. Traveling on Bridge Street from Main, the Windsor bridge approach is about 2 tenths of a mile or 350 yards (320 m). After crossing the bridge, Bridge Street ends at New Hampshire Route 12A, which runs along the Connecticut River on the west and Cornish Wildlife Management Area on the east. Although the public sometimes perceives the bridge as being solely in Windsor, the bridge is mostly in Cornish, given that the New Hampshire-Vermont boundary runs along the western mean low-water mark of the Connecticut River. Put another way, when one enters the bridge from the Windsor side, one is immediately in New Hampshire.

==== From New Hampshire ====
On New Hampshire Route 12A (Town House Road) in Cornish, coming from the south, Bridge Road is a T intersection on the left (west). Traveling from the north, from West Lebanon, New Hampshire along New Hampshire Route 12A, Bridge Road is a T intersection on the right (west) along the Connecticut River.

==== Historical marker ====
Traveling from Cornish, just before the bridge intersection (about 100 feet (30 m) south of the bridge intersection), on the left, there is a parking area (about 175 by 27 feet (53 by 8 m)) for viewing the bridge, which includes a New Hampshire historical marker. The marker (number 158) is one of four in Cornish.

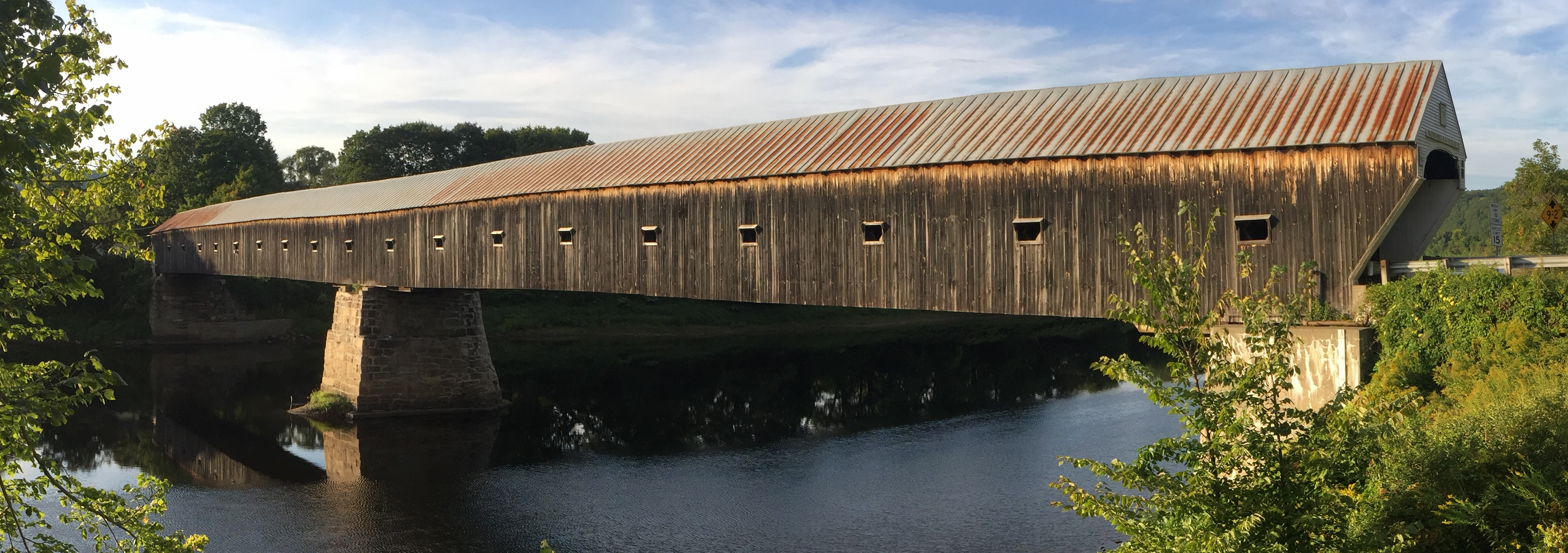
Cornish-Windsor Bridge, looking north-westerly from the Cornish side (September 6, 2018)

== See also ==
Other covered bridges in Cornish

- Blow-Me-Down Covered Bridge, built by James Tasker
- Blacksmith Shop Covered Bridge, now only foot traffic, built by James Tasker
- Dingleton Hill Covered Bridge, built by James Tasker

Covered bridges in West Windsor, Vermont

- Bowers Covered Bridge
- Best's Covered Bridge

Other bridges elsewhere

- List of bridges documented by the Historic American Engineering Record in New Hampshire
- List of bridges documented by the Historic American Engineering Record in Vermont
- List of crossings of the Connecticut River
- List of covered bridges in New Hampshire
- List of covered bridges in Vermont
- Old Blenheim Bridge – previous claim of longest single covered span
- Bridgeport Covered Bridge – another claim of longest single covered span
- Hartland Bridge – The longest covered bridge in the world (located in Hartland, New Brunswick)
- List of bridges on the National Register of Historic Places in New Hampshire
- List of bridges on the National Register of Historic Places in Vermont

Structural design of the Cornish-Windsor Bridge

(image 1 of 9)
1984
Cover page

(image 2 of 9)
1984
South elevation
Deck plan

(image 3 of 9)
1984
Longitudinal section
Reflected deck-framing plan
Reflected floor-framing plan

(image 4 of 9)
1984
East elevation
Transverse section

(image 5 of 9)
1984
Assembly detail

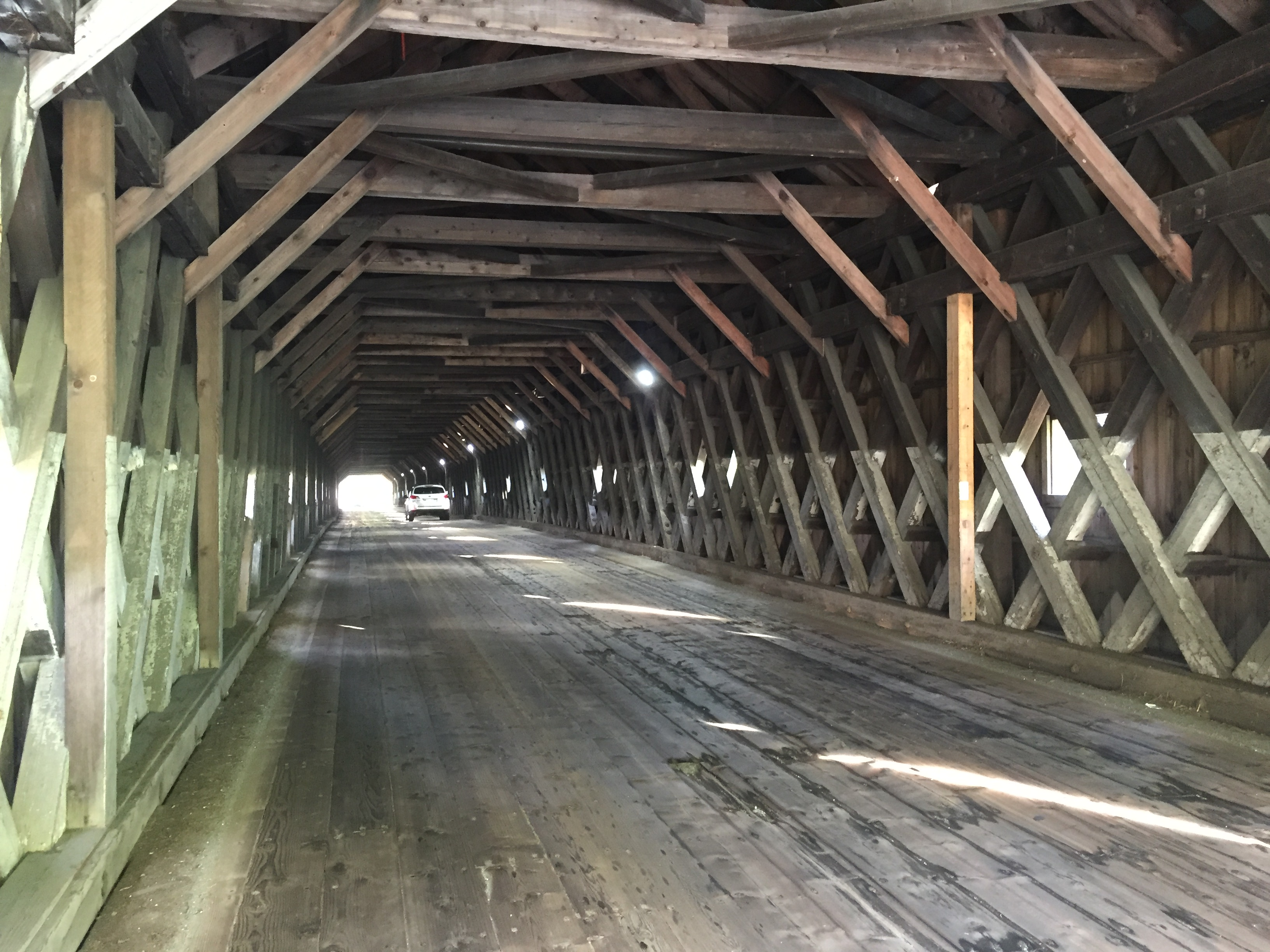
(image 6 of 9)
2018
Viewed from the Cornish side.
The lattices are the diagonal beams on the sides attached to the chords (horizontal beams running, lengthwise, parallel to the floor planks); from top to bottom – the primary upper chord, the secondary upper chord, the secondary lower chord, and the primary lower chord.

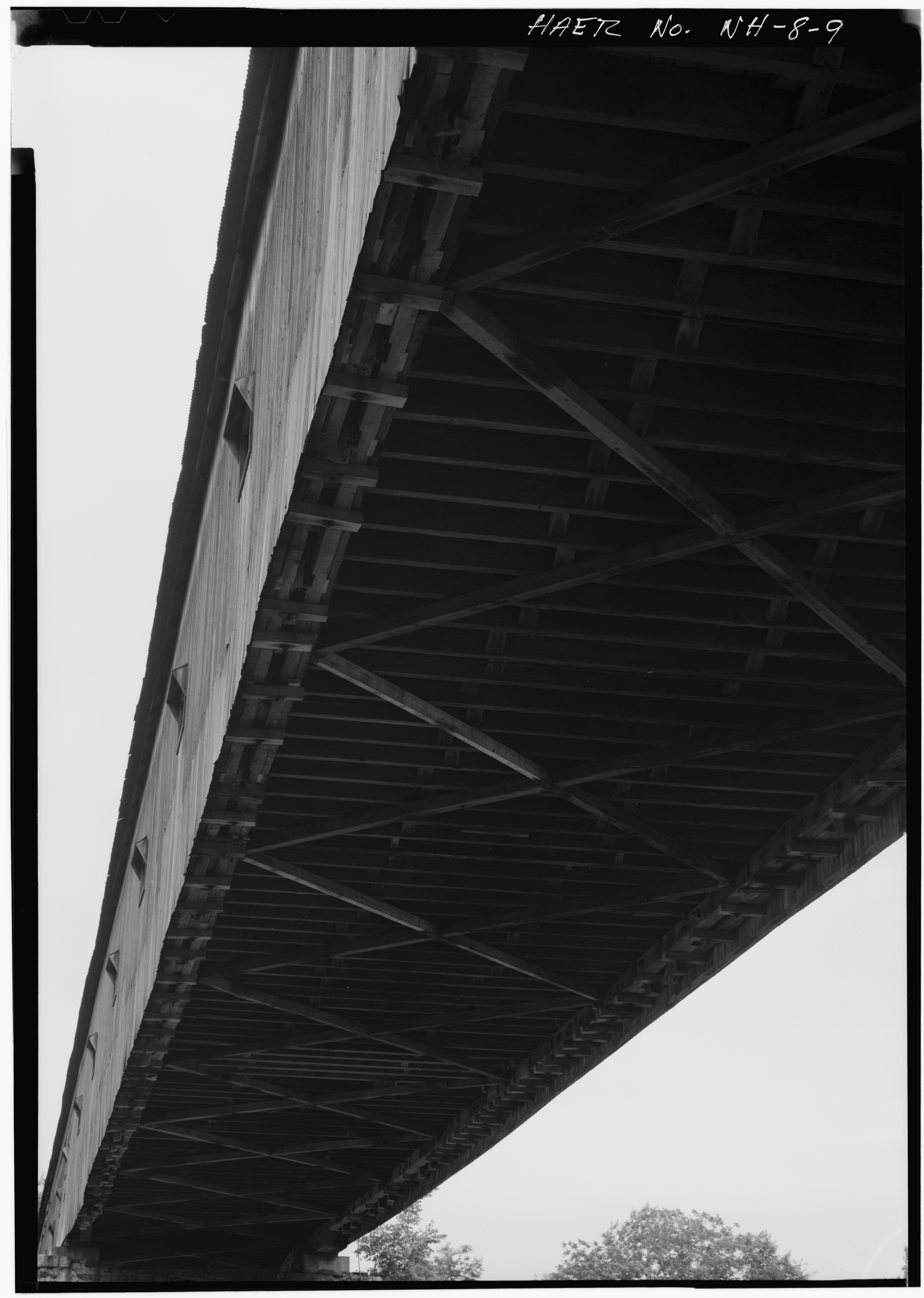
(image 7 of 9)
1984
Underside showing – from the bottom up – the lower lateral braces attached to the floor joists that support the floor planks.

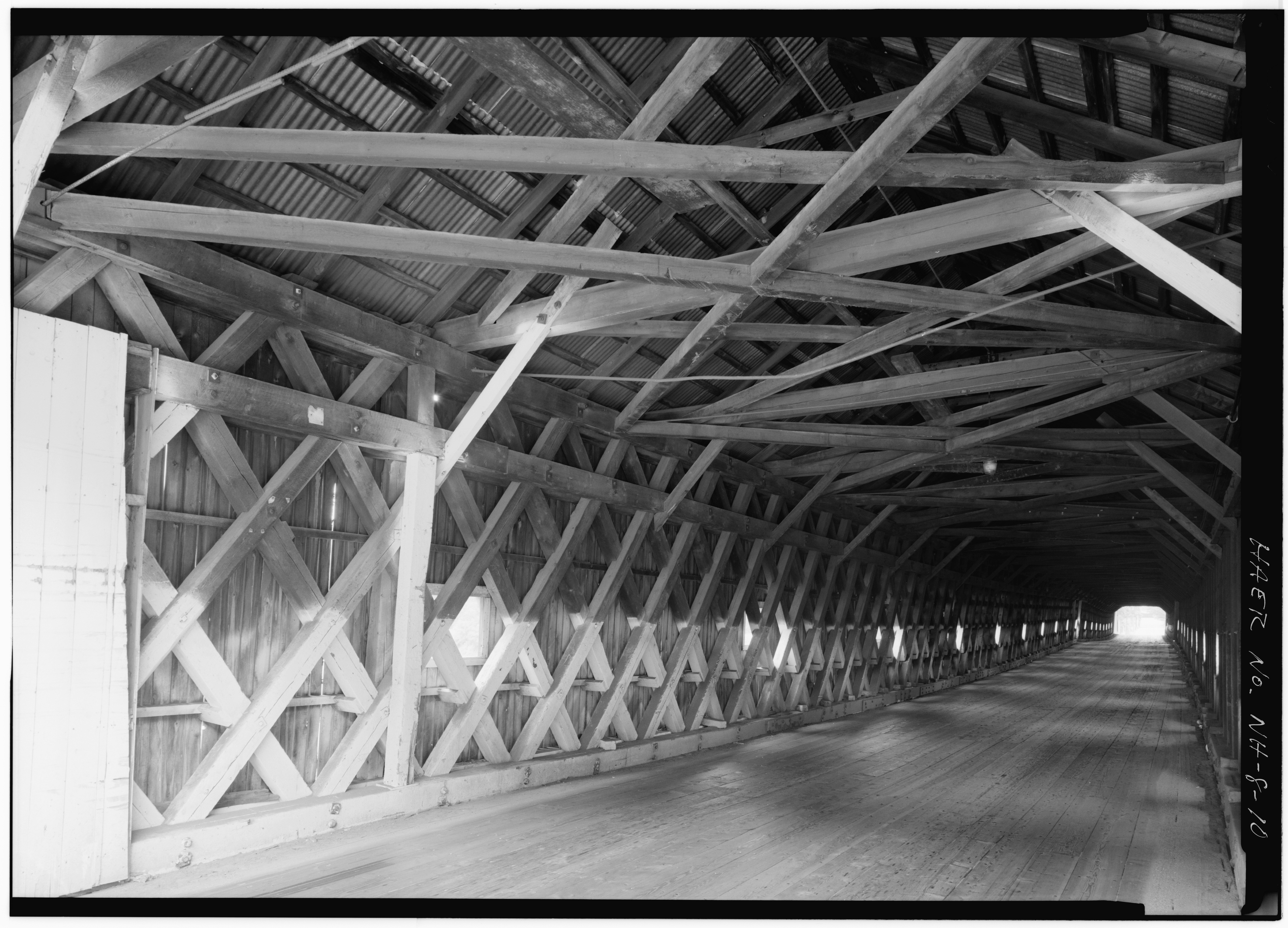
(image 8 of 9)
1984
Looking up, inside, upper lateral braces, sway braces, roof rafters, collar beams, purlins, and roof sheathing

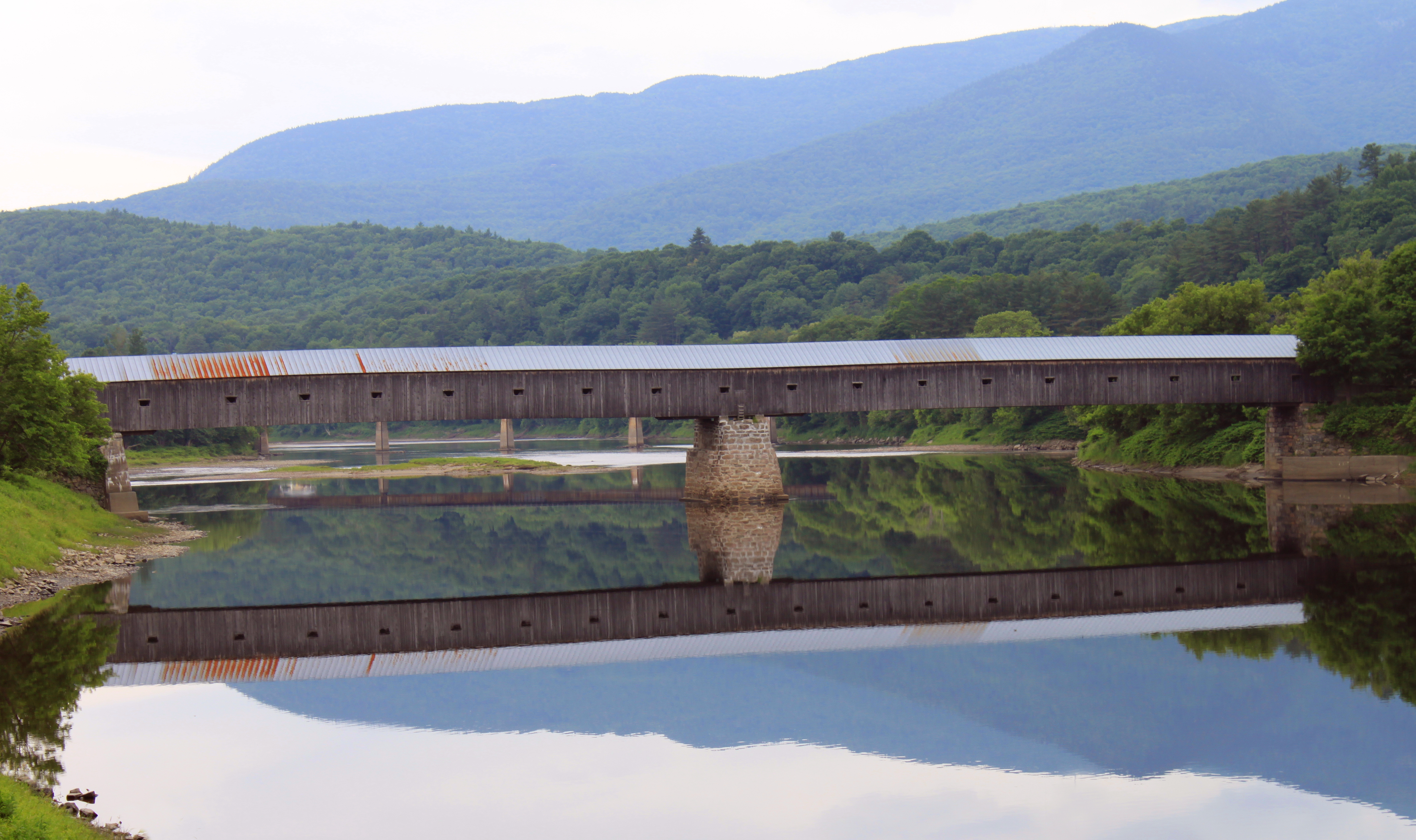
(image 9 of 9)
2014
(Beth Stiner photo)
Looking south and downstream, the four (of five) bridge piers seen in the background are those of the New England Central Railroad Connecticut River Bridge No 3, served locally by Amtrak's Vermonter stop at the Windsor Station. The sightline of the roadroad bridge is eclipsed by the Cornish-Windsor Bridge.
