= Cornish Wildlife Management Area =

Wildlife Management Area in New Hampshire, US

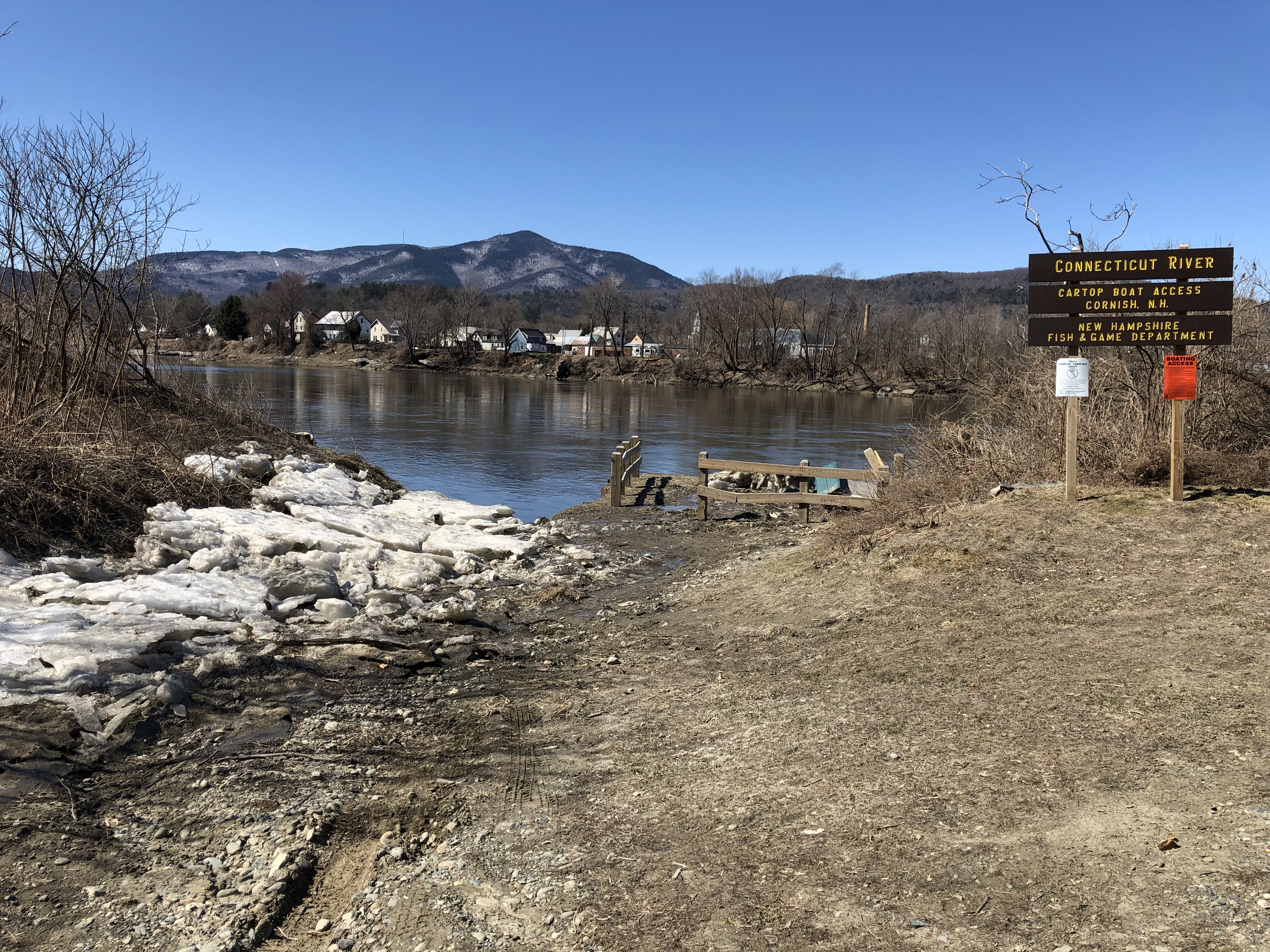
- Connecticut River boat access after ice-out, 2019. Mount Ascutney in Vermont in the background.
- Interactive map of Cornish Wildlife Management Area
- Nearest town: Cornish, New Hampshire
- Coordinates: 43°28′43.25″N 72°22′40.33″W
- Governing body: New Hampshire Fish & Game Department
- Owner: New Hampshire

The Cornish Wildlife Management Area is one of 124 New Hampshire State Wildlife Management Areas (WMAs). It is located in Cornish and covers 29 acres (120,000 m^{2}; 12 ha).

== History ==
The Cornish WMA was purchased in 1972 with Federal Aid in Sport Fish Restoration Act funds to, in this case, provide anglers access to the Connecticut River. A boat ramp was subsequently built on the property in 1974. As of May 2013, there were eight agricultural preservation restrictions or conservation easements along New Hampshire Route 12A in Cornish, all of which have been set up by private landowners to protect the farmland for future generations. The Cornish Wildlife Management Area and Saint-Gaudens National Historic Site in Cornish also protect land along Route 12A.

Cornish State Wildlife Management Area

Climate chart (precipitation, max. and min. temperature)
J	F	M	A	M	J	J	A	S	O	N	D
110 −7 −11	91 −4 −10	77 3 −5	89 14 2	142 18 8	139 21 13	135 22 15	107 21 15	94 18 11	94 12 3	80 5 2	152 −5 −5
- █ Average max. and min. temperatures in °C
- █ Precipitation totals in mm
Imperial conversion
J	F	M	A	M	J	J	A	S	O	N	D
4.3 19 12	3.6 25 14	3 37 23	3.5 57 36	5.6 64 46	5.5 70 55	5.3 72 59	4.2 70 59	3.7 64 52	3.7 54 37	3.1 41 36	6 23 23
- █ Average max. and min. temperatures in °F
- █ Precipitation totals in inches

== WMAs ==
WMAs, in general, are designated for protection and improvement of habitat wildlife, and for public recreation, including hunting, fishing, trapping (by permit only), and wildlife watching. WMAs are subsidized by the Federal government under the authority of the Dingell–Johnson Act (aka the Federal Aid in Sport Fish Restoration Act), enacted in 1950, authorizing the Secretary of the Interior to provide financial assistance for state fish restoration and management plans and projects.

== See also ==
=== Other nearby Wildlife Management Areas ===
Vermont

- Little Ascutney Wildlife Management Area, Weathersfield and West Windsor – 860 acres and included Little Ascutney Mountain and Pierson's Peak
- Hawks Mountain Wildlife Management Area, Cavendish and Baltimore – 2,183 acres in the southern Green Mountains
- Knapp Brook Wildlife Management Area, Cavendish and Reading – 1,530 acres
- Arthur Davis Wildlife Management Area, Reading, Vermont, 7,788 acres
- Skitchewaug Wildlife Management Area, Springfield – 216 acres
- Densmore Hill Wildlife Management Area, Hartland – 252 acres
- Plymsbury Wildlife Management Area, Plymouth – 1,859 acres

New Hampshire

- Spaulding Wildlife Management Area, Charlestown, New Hampshire – 54 acres, next to the Hubbard Hill State Forest
- Chase Island Wildlife Management Area, Cornish, New Hampshire – 10 acres on the Connecticut River

=== Nearby state lands ===
- Pillsbury State Park, Goshen, New Hampshire
- Gile State Forest, Springfield, New Hampshire

=== National Wildlife Refuges in New Hampshire and Vermont ===
New Hampshire

- Great Bay National Wildlife Refuge
- John Hay National Wildlife Refuge
- Umbagog National Wildlife Refuge
- Wapack National Wildlife Refuge

Vermont

- Missisquoi National Wildlife Refuge
