= Green hunting =

Non-lethal alternative to hunting using tranquilization

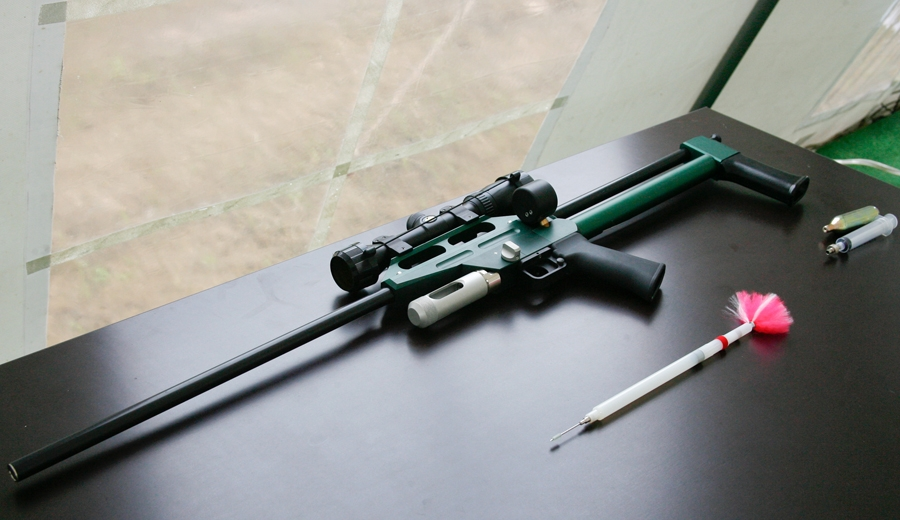
Air rifle with tranquilliser dart

Green hunting (also eco-hunting, green bullet concept, green darting or darting safari) is the practice of tracking and shooting game animals with non-lethal tranquilizer guns or bows and subsequently releasing the captured animals alive. Green hunting would typically be performed when tranquilization of the animal is necessary for veterinary, monitoring or species translocation purposes.

Green hunting has been advocated as a conservation-minded alternative to sport hunting, because it allows the hunter to experience the thrill of a traditional hunt without actually killing the animal (similar to the catch and release practice promoted by modern recreational fishing), leaving the wildlife abundance undiminished and thus contributing directly to conservation initiatives. The measurements and details of a tranquilized animal are generally accepted by hunting organization's logbooks and fiberglass trophy mounts can be made to accolade the hunter. There are some other advantages of eco-hunting, as the hunter has the additional option to be kept regularly updated on the animal's future movements if the darting was part of a GPS animal tracking project. Though still costly (sometimes upwards of US$25,000), green hunting is more economical as fees are typically lower than trophy hunting (up to US$60,000). The fees finance the conservation project that necessitates an immobilized animal for microchipping, ear-notching, tissue collection or GPS tracking and any additional funds can be used to support the management of the protected area involved. Due to the significantly reduced terminal ballistics, the hunter must get within 30 metres (98 ft) from the target animal to successfully dart it, often much closer than required for traditional hunting. Group darting safaris also exist, where a group of spectators witness the hunt without participating in the procedures.

Ideally, all green hunts involve a veterinarian to safely administer anesthesia and ensure procedures prioritize the well-being of the animal. The immobilization should occur in the morning when temperatures are cooler, the immobilized animals' ears and eyes should be covered to reduce stress while sampling, measurements, and other procedures occur, after which an antidote is administered to reverse the tranquilization effect. Cat species are particularly vulnerable to anesthesia and should be monitored for 24 hours after immobilization. Criticism has sprung up over the possibility that particular animals may undergo tranquilization too frequently in the interest of generating revenue, with cases of corruption culminating in a loss of support for green hunting by government, conservation and hunting organizations.

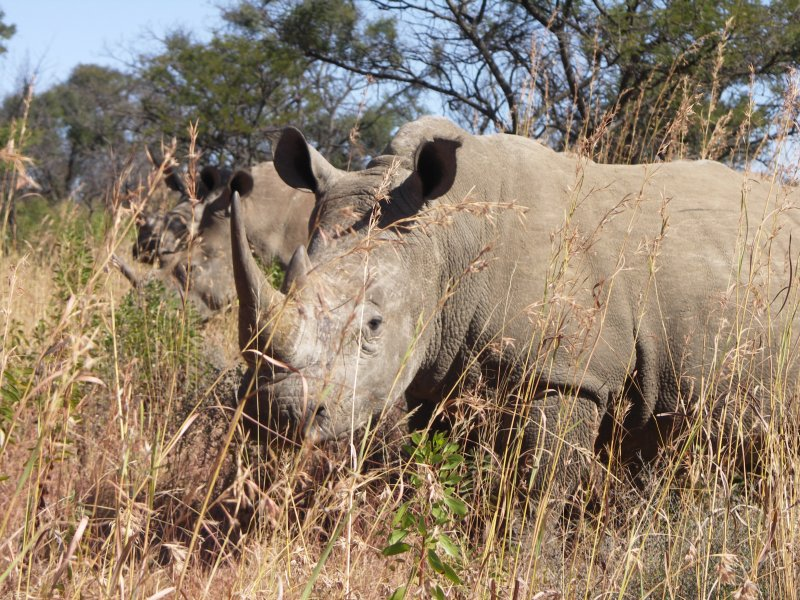
White Rhino, South Africa

== History ==
The concept of darting animals for conservation purposes under the name of "green hunting" has been attributed to multiple sources in South Africa: Dr. Paul Bartles, head of the Wildlife Biological Resource Center of the National Zoological Gardens, the Wildlife Protection Service of South Africa as well the conservation organization Save the Elephants. The first documentation of green hunting was from a GPS collaring project that tracked elephants at the Timbavati Game Reserve of South Africa in 1998. Sport hunting rhinos using tranquilizer darts had occurred before the concept of green hunting, but the practice was formalized after support from conservation organizations and an important shift in the South African economy from the agricultural sector to the wildlife sector in the early 2000s. The loss of profitability in conventional agriculture through deregulation, farming subsidies and other changes to land-related policies led to rapid conversion of farmland to game ranche, leading initiatives like green hunting to be widely and quickly implemented.

The fees accrued from the green darting of the Big Five game species (elephant, rhino, cape buffalo, leopard, lion) became an important alternative to trophy hunting fees for financing conservation projects, including both private and public protected areas. The negative reputation of trophy hunting was of concern for stakeholders as international tourism in Africa grew significantly in this period. Green hunting was proposed as an innovative solution that could provide funding without the ecological repercussions caused by trophy hunting –namely the impact on population dynamics from the loss of prominent males. In the hunting community, green hunting was legitimized after major hunting organizations such as Safari Club International, officially recognized measurements from tranquilized animals in their trophy record books. This garnered hopes that eco-hunting could completely replace trophy hunting.

Despite "strict protocols" established in South Africa by the Department of Nature Conservation as green hunting gain popularity, legislation in 2006 banned non-veterinarians from darting animals, eliminating it as an alternative for trophy hunters in the country. By the 2010s, green hunting has reportedly been denounced by several organizations, including the Professional Hunters Association of South Africa, the South African Veterinary Council, Game Rangers Association of Africa and the Department of Environmental Affairs. In recent years, green hunting has received little attention and has been further impacted by new legislation in South Africa such as the National Environmental Management: Protected Areas Act, the National Environmental Management: Biodiversity Act and the Threatened or Protected Species Regulations. Amid this negative reputation, green hunting continues in the form of spectator darting safaris in South Africa and its role in the mitigation of rhinoceros horn trade is still considered valuable.

Green hunting in Paraguay funds jaguar relocation projects.

== Controversies ==
Green hunting is now generally denounced by governments, conservation organizations and animal rights groups due to cases of corruption, concerns about the ethics of dart safaris and issues of tranquilizer being sold by veterinarians on the black market. Critics claim green hunts became primarily business ventures, leaving conservation elements to be neglected in favor of profits. Despite a significant pool of animals needed to be tranquilized for studies, there are cases of multiple immobilizations of an individual occurring solely for the sake of sport. Specialists argue that animals should be tranquilized no more than one to two times a year. In one alleged case, tranquilization of the same rhino occurred once every two weeks, raising concerns regarding the negative physiological impact of repeated tranquilizations given the lack of studies on the related effects and consequences. Known dangers of the tranquilization process include cardiac arrest, asphyxiation and/or organ damage from the position of the animal upon collapse and vulnerability to predation, falling and drowning post-procedure. Even under the strict veterinary procedures of a research context, there are several cases of death due to tranquilization related complications.

It has been suggested that banning green hunting in South Africa is contradictory given that game hunting remains legal. In Zimbabwe, a survey showed that most hunters would prefer green hunts over trophy hunts and called for an international certification system to diminish corruption. Corruption issues of green hunting are aggravated by the complex, fragmented and outdated regulatory system for private protected areas, without international standards. Further sensitization of stakeholders to principles of conservation ecology and regional and international cooperation is suggested for the long-term success of future initiatives.

Green hunting is sometimes grouped with the much more controversial practice of canned hunting.

== See also ==
- Fair chase
- Hunting and conservation
- Hunting and wildlife management
