= North American Model of Wildlife Conservation =

Management strategy used in the United States and Canada

The North American Model of Wildlife Conservation is a set of principles that has guided wildlife management and conservation decisions in the United States and Canada. Although not formally articulated until 2001, the model has its origins in 19th century conservation movements, the near extinction of several species of wildlife (including the American bison) and the rise of sportsmen with the middle class. Beginning in the 1860s sportsmen began to organize and advocate for the preservation of wilderness areas and wildlife. The North American Model of Wildlife Conservation rests on two basic principles – fish and wildlife are for the non-commercial use of citizens, and should be managed such that they are available at optimum population levels forever.

== History ==
Since early colonial years, there were few laws protecting fish and wildlife on North American continent, and its wildlife resources took a heavy toll. Market hunters took fish and wildlife at will while habitat disappeared under plow and roads, resulting in devastating reductions in wildlife populations. Some species, like the passenger pigeon, were exploited to extinction; others, such as American bison, white-tailed deer, and wild turkeys, declined to a fraction of their original population. Led by conservation leaders like Aldo Leopold, Teddy Roosevelt, and John Muir, hunting and fishing communities came together, and used politics and power to make great strides for conserving North America's vast wildlife resources.

As the tides turned for conservation, important laws were passed, including the Migratory Bird Treaty Act of 1918, the Migratory Bird Hunting and Conservation Stamp Act of 1934, the Wildlife Restoration Act of 1937, and the Sport Fish Restoration Act of 1950 (currently known as the Pittman-Robertson Act and Dingell-Johnson Act). Collectively, these acts laid the foundation for a funding mechanism to state wildlife management agencies and are a large part of the U.S. Fish and Wildlife Service's history.

The acts formed a partnership between states, industry, and the federal government. They comprise, on average, more than 75% of a state fish and wildlife agency's annual budget, according to the Association of Fish and Wildlife Agencies. The Service works closely with industry and states to ensure the funds are spent on conservation programs that meet the purposes of the acts.

Through self-imposed excise taxes on hunting, shooting, archery and angling equipment, and a tax on boating fuels, hunters, recreational shooters and anglers have generated approximately $25.5 billion for wildlife and habitat conservation since 1937. These Wildlife Restoration and Sport Fish Restoration revenues, raised through the Pittman-Robertson Act and Dingell-Johnson Act, are managed by the U.S. Fish and Wildlife's Wildlife and Sport Fish Restoration Program. In 2022, a record $1.5 billion was distributed to states and territories through the program.

== Tenets ==
The core principles of the Model are elaborated upon in the seven major tenets:

=== Wildlife as Public Trust Resources ===
In the North American Model, wildlife is held in the public trust. This means that fish and wildlife are held by the public through state and federal governments. In other words, though an individual may own the land upon which wildlife resides, that individual does not own said wildlife. Instead, the wildlife is owned by all citizens. With origins in Roman times and English Common law, the public trust doctrine has at its heart the 1842 Supreme Court ruling Martin V. Waddell.

=== Elimination of Markets for Game ===
Commercial hunting and the sale of wildlife is prohibited to ensure the sustainability of wildlife populations. This principle holds that unregulated economic markets for game and non-game wildlife are unacceptable because they privatize a common resource and lead to declines. The Lacey Act of 1900 effectively made market hunting illegal in the United States, and the Migratory Bird Treaty Act of 1918 provided international protections from the market.

=== Allocation of Wildlife by Law ===
Wildlife is allocated to the public by law, as opposed to market principles, land ownership, or other status. Democratic processes and public input into law-making help ensure access is equitable. Laws regulating access to wildlife include the 1940 Bald and Golden Eagle Protection Act, Endangered Species Preservation Act and Fur Seal Act of 1966, the Marine Mammal Protection Act of 1972, and the 1973 Endangered Species Act.

=== Wildlife Should Only be Killed for a Legitimate Purpose ===
Under the North American Model, the killing of game must be done only for food, fur, self-defense, and the protection of property (including livestock). In other words, it is broadly regarded as unlawful and unethical to kill fish or wildlife (even with a license) without making all reasonable effort to retrieve and make reasonable use of the resource.

=== Wildlife is Considered an International Resource ===
As wildlife do not exist only within fixed political boundaries, effective management of these resources must be done internationally, through treaties and the cooperation of management agencies.

=== Science is the Proper Tool for Discharge of Wildlife Policy ===
The North American Model recognizes science as a basis for informed management and decision-making processes. This tenet draws from the writings of Aldo Leopold, who in the 1930s called for a wildlife conservation movement facilitated by trained wildlife biologists that made decisions based on facts, professional experience, and commitment to shared underlying principles, rather than strictly interests of hunting, stocking, or culling of predators. Science in wildlife policy includes studies of population dynamics, behavior, habitat, adaptive management, and national surveys of hunting and fishing.

=== Democracy of Hunting ===
This tenet is inspired by Theodore Roosevelt's idea that open access to hunting would result in many benefits to society. This tenet supports access to firearms and the hunting industry, of which much funding for conservation is derived.

== Criticism ==
Some authors have questioned whether the North America Model is inclusive of all wildlife conservation interests or exclusively narrow in its application. The North American model has also been criticized as presenting an "inadequate history" and prescribing "inadequate ethics" of conservation, and in giving recreational hunting disproportionate credit for its role in conservation. Critics say some tenets are flawed or misguided, for example that the tenet Elimination of Markets for Game overlooks the conservation success of Europe- where wildlife is privatized and commercialized- and ignores the role of sustainable harvest strategies, or that some hunting activity may be inherently contradictory to the tenet Wildlife Should Only be Killed for a Legitimate Purpose.

Much debate has occurred over the tenet Science is the Proper Tool for Discharge of Wildlife Policy. Some authors suggest that by and large the scientific foundation is missing from the process of managing wildlife. However, their interpretation of "science-based management" has been challenged as being too limiting to encompass the nuances of wildlife management in North America.
