= Trophy hunting =

Hunting of wild animals for trophies

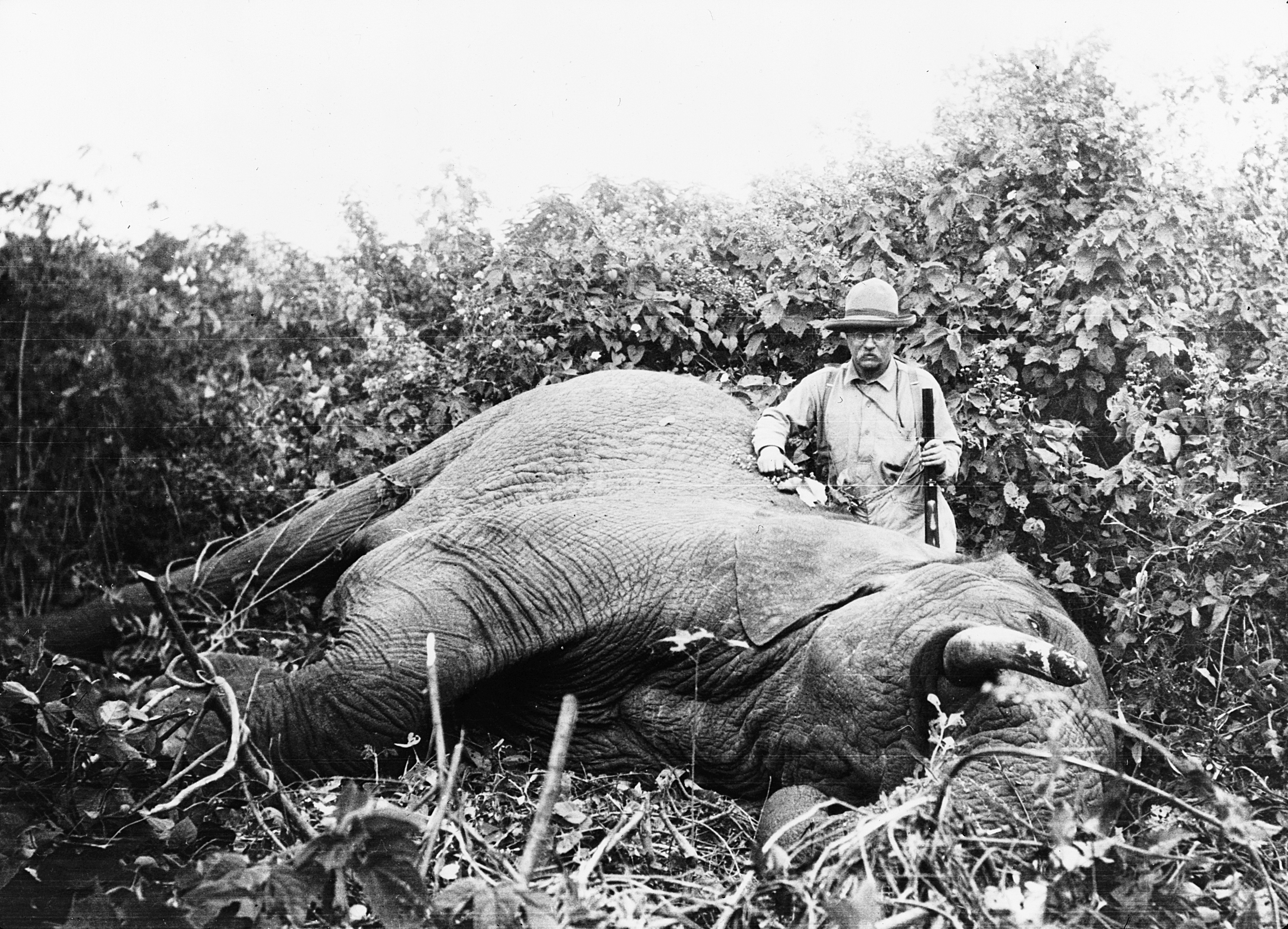
Theodore Roosevelt standing beside a dead elephant on a trophy hunting trip in Africa.

Trophy hunting is a form of hunting for sport in which parts of the hunted wild animals are kept and displayed as trophies. The animal being targeted, known as the "game", is typically a mature male specimen from a popular species of collectable interests, usually of large sizes, holding impressive horns, antlers, furs, or manes. Most trophies consist of only select parts of the animal, which are prepared for display by a taxidermist. The parts most commonly kept vary by species but often include the head, hide, tusks, horns, or antlers.

Trophies are often displayed in trophy rooms or game rooms, or in gun rooms along with the hunter's gun collection.

Trophy hunting has strong supporters and opponents. The controversy focuses on the morality of hunting for pleasure rather than for practical use, as well as questions about the extent to which big-game hunting benefits conservation efforts.

== Types of trophy hunting ==
=== African trophy hunting ===
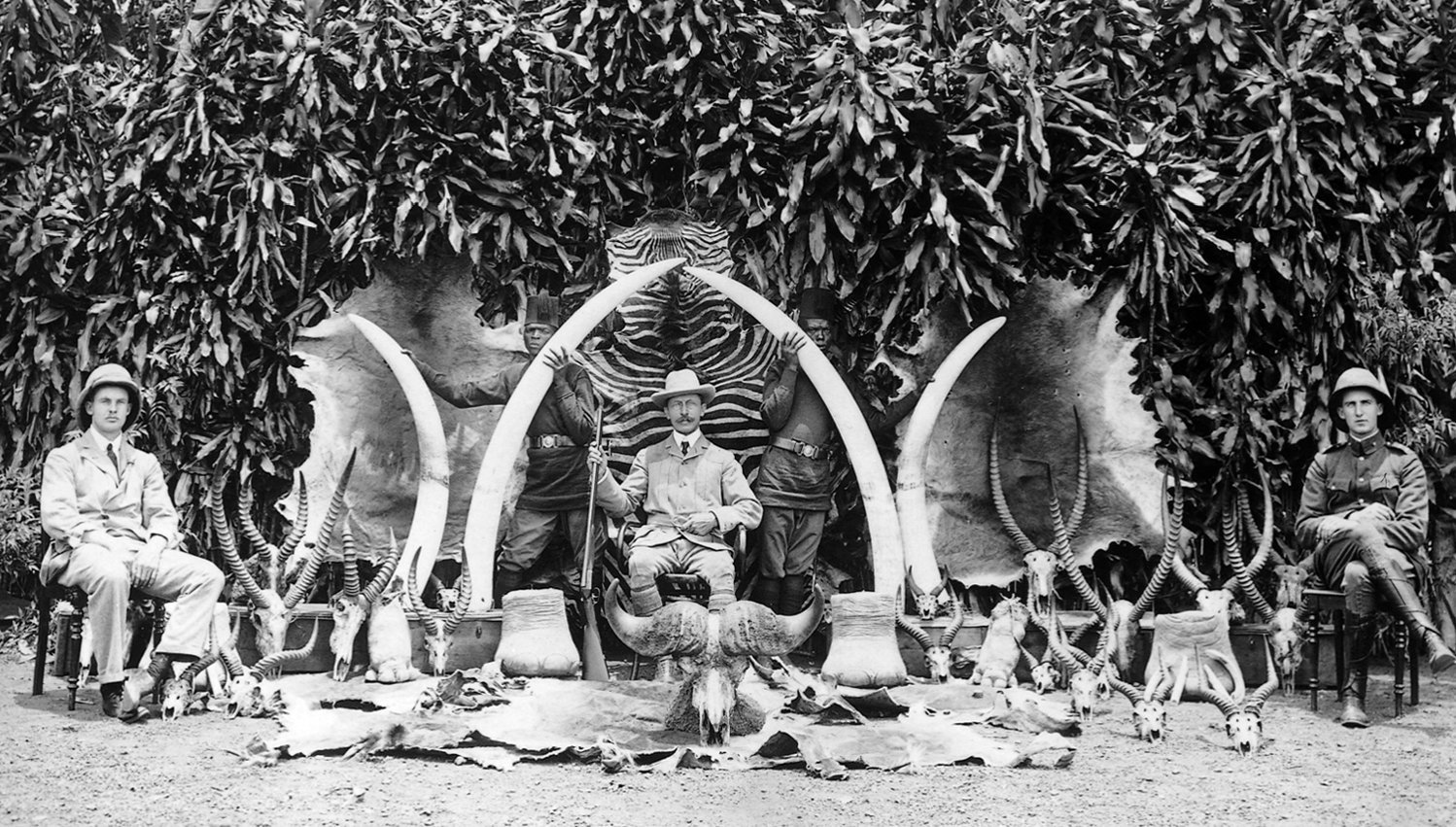
British Governor Henry Hesketh Bell with hunting trophies in Uganda, 1908

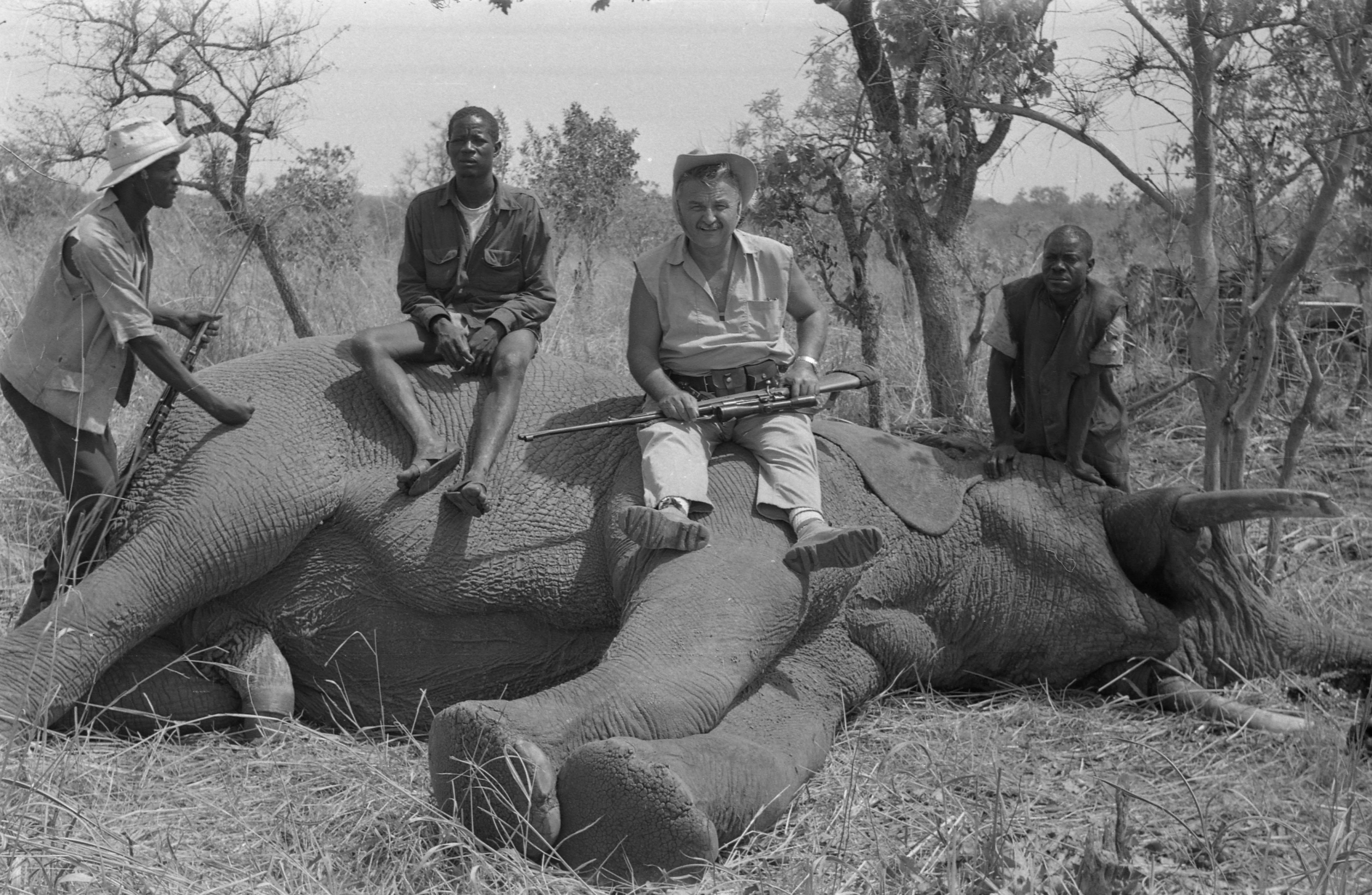
A hunter and local guides posing with an elephant they killed, 1970

Trophy hunting has been practiced in Africa for centuries. Popularized by British hunters and conservationists such as Frederick Selous, Walter Bell, and Samuel Baker, who hunted and collected animals for natural history museums in British colonies in Africa and India. This resulted in the development of a new form of tourism industry that generates many millions of revenue for Africa per year. One of the first renowned safaris recorded took place in the early 20th century by President Theodore Roosevelt and his son Kermit. Professional hunters such as Phillip Percival, Sydney Downey, and Harry Selby are among the first safari guides that contributed to molding the industry. The practice of trophy hunting predates that of ranch or farm hunting, but game ranches helped to legitimize trophy hunting as a facet of the tourism industry in Africa. The first game ranches in Africa were established in the 1960s and the concept quickly grew in proliferation. Statistics from 2000 illustrate that there were approximately 7,000 game farms and reservations operating within South Africa, established on about 16 million hectares of land in the country. Game ranches attract wealthy tourists interested in hunting, as well as foreign investors on a large scale.

=== North American trophy hunting ===
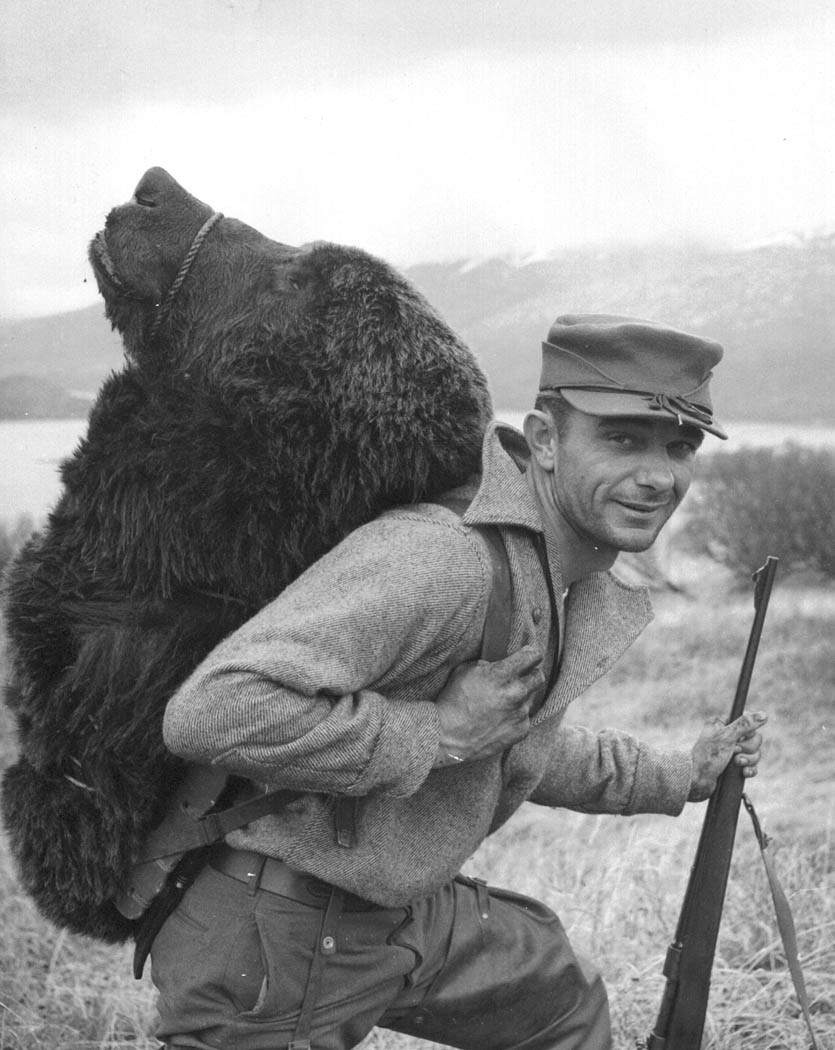
Hunter with a bear's head and hide strapped to his back on the Kodiak Archipelago

Trophy hunting in North America was encouraged as a way of conservation by organizations such as the Boone & Crockett club as hunting an animal with a big set of antlers or horns is a way of selecting only the mature animals, contributing to shape a successful conservation model in the country in which hunting takes a fundamental role, and trophy hunters have been deeply involved in preserving wildlife and wild spaces. Such is the case of president Theodore Roosevelt, who, after becoming president of the United States in 1901, he used his authority to establish 150 national forests, 51 federal bird reserves, four national game preserves, five national parks and 18 national monuments on over 230 million acres of public land.

Furthermore, hunting for meat, trophies or recreational purposes provides an income to each state for managing wildlife and their natural habitats through the Pittman Robertson Act, resulting in the expansion of natural habitats and increase of populations of big game hunting species across the country.

After the public response from the killing of Cecil the lion, awareness of this sport was raised worldwide. Attention also focused on North American sport hunting, in particular the cougar. The cougar, also called the mountain lion, puma, or panther, is hunted for sport across its expansive range. The only federally protected populations in the country are the Florida panther.

Several states—including Colorado, Utah and Washington—in recent years have proposed an increase in cougar hunting for various reasons, and California is currently the only state throughout the West that prohibits cougar hunting.

The Boone and Crockett Club claims that the selective harvest of older males aids in the recovery of many big game species which were on the brink of extinction at the turn of the 20th century. The organization monitors the conservation success of this practice through its Big Game Records data set.

North American trophy hunting should not be confused with 'canned hunting' or 'vanity hunting', which involves the shooting of (sometimes intensively bred) animals in a range designed for ease of kills, more for the purpose of collecting an animal for display than the sport. The Boone and Crockett Club disavows this practice and actively campaigns against it, as it removes the element of 'fair chase'.

=== Ranch hunting ===
Ranch hunting is a form of big-game hunting where the animals hunted are specifically bred on a ranch for trophy hunting purposes.

Many species of game such as the Indian blackbuck, nilgai, axis deer, barasingha, the Iranian red sheep, and variety of other species of deer, sheep, and antelope, as well as tigers and lions and hybrids of these from Africa, Asia, and the Pacific islands were introduced to ranches in Texas and Florida for the sake of trophy hunting.

These animals are typically hunted on a fee for each kill, with hunters paying $4,000 or more to be able to hunt exotic game. As many of these species are endangered or threatened in their native habitat, the United States' government requires 10% of the hunting fee to be given to conservation efforts in the areas where these animals are indigenous. Hunting of endangered animals in the United States is normally illegal under the Endangered Species Act but is permitted on these ranches since the rare animals hunted there are not indigenous to the United States.

The Humane Society of the United States has criticized these ranches and their hunters with the reasoning that they are still hunting endangered animals even if the animals were raised specifically to be hunted.

=== In Pakistan ===
Pakistan harbors a collection of the most uncommon types of wild sheep and goats on the planet. These include the Blue sheep, Kashmir, Astor, and Suleman Markhors, as well as Punjab, Blandford, and Afghan Urials, alongside the Himalayan and Sindh Ibex. Pakistan has developed a community-centered trophy-hunting initiative that relies on incentives as a means of conservation. This approach is meticulously structured to find an equilibrium between the preservation requirements of mountain ecosystems and the economic needs of marginalized communities that have shared their environment with wildlife for generations. The initial instance of such a program in Pakistan was the Chitral Conservation Hunting Program (CCHP) targeting Markhor, which commenced in 1983. Trophy hunting has produced positive results in Pakistan. Presently, the markhor population in the country has surged to a range of 3,500 to 4,000 individuals, in contrast to the figures of 1,500 to 2,000 noted in 2001. Within the framework of the trophy hunting initiative, indigenous communities are allocated 80% of the license fees, while the remaining portion is retained by the government. Despite its achievements, trophy hunting in Pakistan has raised apprehensions. Some privately operated and even certain officially registered trophy hunting operators have fallen short in upholding its principles. They have been criticized for providing foreign hunters with options to pursue and kill endangered wild animals that warrant protection.

== Game auctions ==
Game auctions have become another source of income destined to preserve wildlife and provide an economic value to their natural habitats. Such is the case of sheep hunting in North America, where large amounts of money are paid at auctions to hunt for them, such as bighorn sheep, dall ram, stone sheep and desert big horn, which constitute the grand slam of trophy sheep hunting. Hunting for sheep has helped to raise funds used to boost populations of these animals while preserving their habitats. Sheep hunt takes place in rugged mountain terrains where spot and stalk is the usual method to hunt for these species, making this hunt a challenge. Only old rams may be taken, and in order to be sure about their age, the sheep hunter has to identify the age and gender by reading the size and shape of their horns that happen to determine the trophy quality. However, the real trophy about this hunt is the whole experience rather than just the animal's head. This type of hunt was probably become so popular thanks to the writings of gun editor and hunter Jack O'Connor.

In Africa, game auctions help provide game farms and reserves with their wildlife. These facilities are important in terms of tourism in Africa, one of the continent's largest economic sectors, accounting for almost 5% of South Africa's GDP, for example. South Africa in particular is the main tourist destination on the continent, and as a result, hosts a large number of game auctions, farms, and reservations. Game auctions serve as competitive markets that allow farm and reservation owners to bid on and purchase animals for their facilities. Animals purchased at auctions for these purposes are commonly bought directly as game or are then bred to supply facilities. Animals used for breeding are generally females, which cost more on average than males due to the increased breeding prospects they present. In addition to sex, other factors that contribute to the prices of animals on auction include the demand for particular species (based on their overall rarity) and the costs of maintaining them. Animals that receive increased interest from poachers, such as rhinos or elephants due to their ivory horns and tusks, present additional risks to game farm operations, and do not typically sell well at auction. However other herbivores, specifically ungulate species, tend to fetch exponentially higher sums than carnivores. Prices for these animals can reach into the hundreds of thousands in South African rands, equivalent to tens of thousands of American dollars.

== Legal issues and effects ==
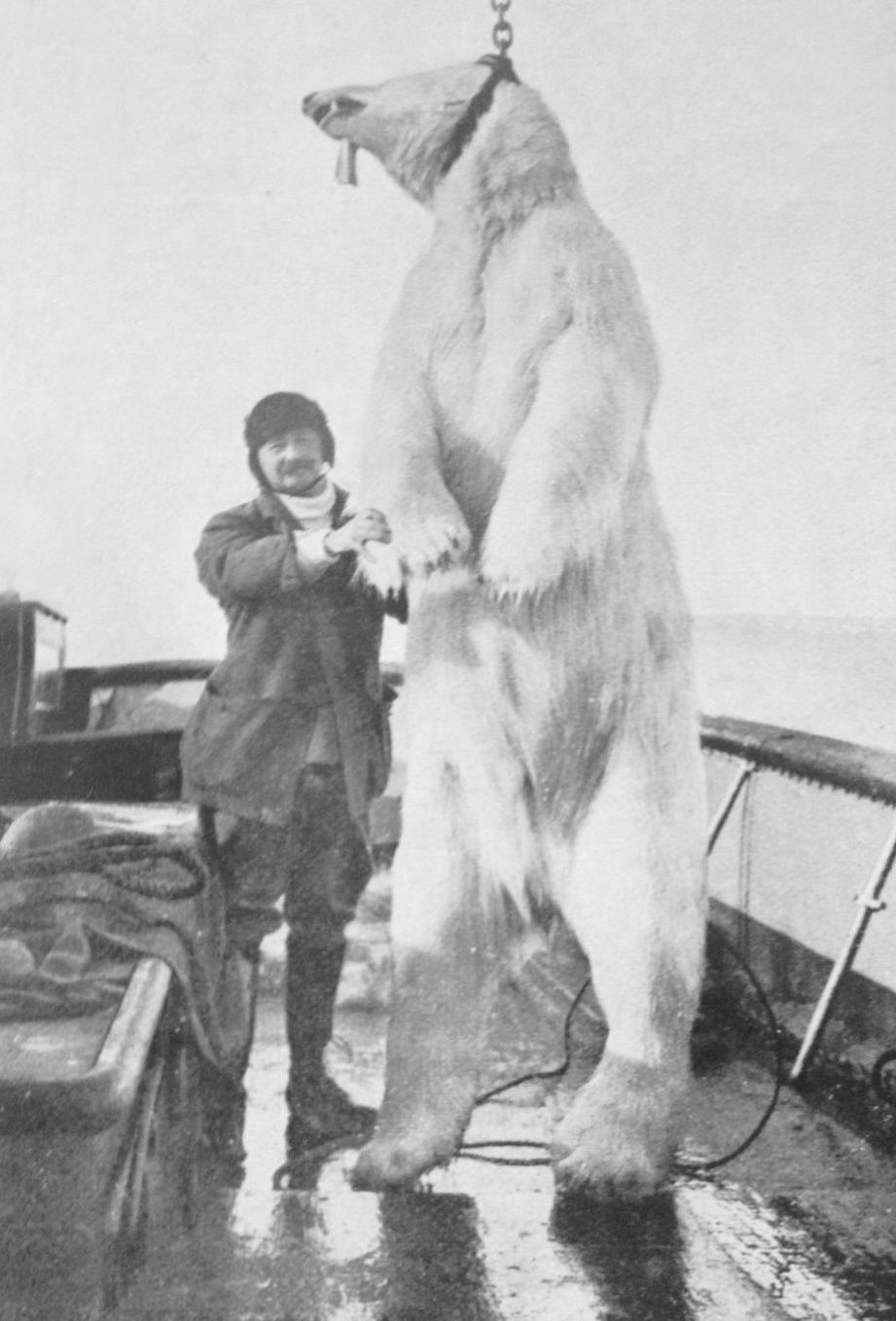
The 17th Duke of Medinaceli with a trophy polar bear killed by him in an expedition with the 18th Duke of Peñaranda to the Arctic Circle, 1910

Trophy hunting is legal in many countries, through policies that ensure that hunting practices align to a sustainable use of the country's natural resources. Restrictions on the species that can be hunted (e.g., protected species such as brown bears in European Union), are usually based on populations, hunting seasons, number of available licenses and types of arms, calibers and hunting procedures, asuring hunting ethics. Permits and government consent are also required. However, some countries such as Costa Rica,

The U.S. Fish and Wildlife Service imposed a ban on imports, limited to elephant trophies from Zimbabwe and Tanzania for 2014–2015. But the ban was lifted and it has currently granted permits afterwards.

In 2001, Botswana instituted a one-year ban on lion hunting. They had previously permitted the hunting of fifty lions each year, which caused a shortage in mature males in the population, as the hunters preferred the lions with the largest manes. After the ban, Safari Club International, including prominent member former President George H. W. Bush, successfully lobbied the Botswanan government to reverse the ban.

Botswana again banned trophy hunting in 2014, and now villagers claim they get no income from trophy hunters, suffer from damaged crop fields caused by elephants and buffaloes, and African lions killing their livestock. Some conservationists claim trophy hunting is more effective for wildlife management than a complete hunting ban.

In the wake of the killing of Cecil the lion, Emirates, American Airlines, Delta Air Lines and United Airlines banned the transportation of hunting trophies on flights.

Restrictions on lion hunting may reduce tolerance for the species among communities where local people benefit from trophy hunting and may reduce funds available for anti-poaching.

== Influence in conservation ==
=== In Africa ===
Trophy hunting can provide economic incentives to conserve areas for wildlife: 'if it pays it stays'; there are research studies corroborating this in Conservation Biology, Journal of Sustainable Tourism, Wildlife Conservation by Sustainable Use, and Animal Conservation.

Tanzania has an estimated 40 percent of the population of lions. Its wildlife authorities defend their success in keeping such numbers (as compared to countries like Kenya, where lion numbers have plummeted dramatically) as linked to the use of trophy hunting as a conservation tool. According to Alexander N. Songorwa, director of wildlife for the Tanzanian Ministry of Natural Resources and Tourism, trophy hunting generated roughly $75 million for Tanzania's economy from 2008 to 2011. Of the estimated 16,800 lions in Tanzania, some 200 lions are killed a year, generating about $1,960,000 in revenue in trophy fees alone. A 2011 study in Conservation Biology found that hunting quotas should be set regionally as a number of lions/1000 km2, as opposed to nationally, as regional overhunting had likely lead to local declines.

Adolescent lions are primarily responsible for slain livestock and unwanted human interaction. In addition, they often drive females with cubs into hiding or new territory, forcing the females to hunt new prey.

==== Effects of trophy hunting on animal populations ====
When poorly managed, trophy hunting can cause negative ecological impacts for the target species such as altered age/sex structures, social disruption, deleterious genetic effects, and even population declines in the event of excessive off-takes, as well as threaten the conservation and influence the behavior of non-target species. The conservation role of the industry is also hindered by governments and hunting operators that fail to devolve adequate benefits to local communities, reducing incentives for them to protect wildlife, and by unethical activities, such as shooting from vehicles and canned hunting conducted by some, attract negative press. While locals may hunt certain species as pests, particularly carnivorous species such as leopards, these animals, as well as lions and cougars, are known to exhibit infanticidal tendencies which can be exacerbated by the removal of adult males from their populations. Males are trophy hunted more frequently than females. However, the removal of these males still degrades the networks and groups these species create in order to survive and provide for offspring. Hunting regulations and laws proposing constant proportions or thresholds of community members for these species have been proposed in African nations such as Botswana, Zambia and Zimbabwe, but are exceptionally difficult to enforce due to the logistics of tracking carnivore populations.

==== Effects on habitat loss ====
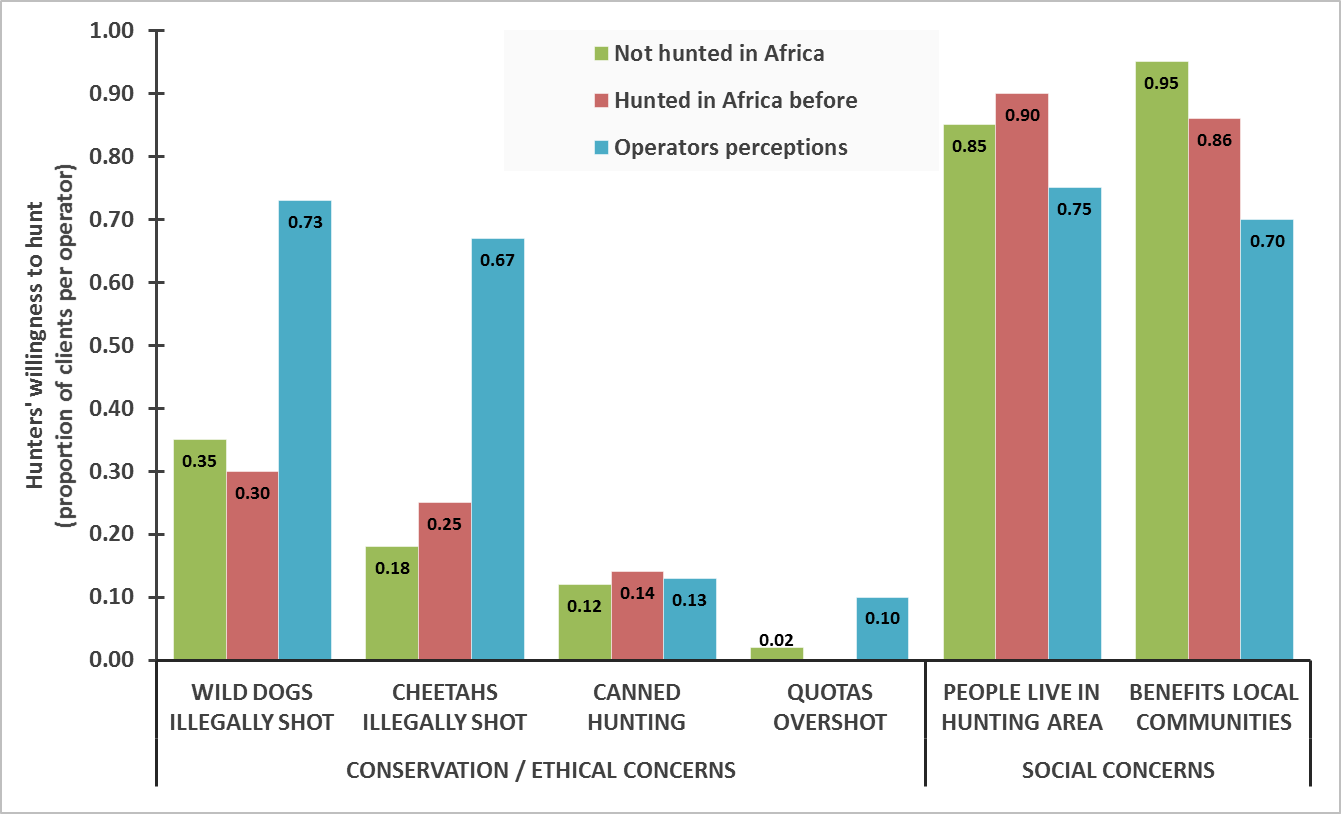
Surveyed Views of Trophy Hunters Lindsey et al. (2006)

A 2005 paper by Nigel Leader-Williams and colleagues in the Journal of International Wildlife Law and Policy asserted that the legalization of white rhinoceros hunting in South Africa motivated private landowners to reintroduce the species onto their lands. As a result, white rhinos increased from fewer than one hundred individuals to more than 11,000. Leader-Williams's study also showed that trophy hunting in Zimbabwe doubled wildlife areas relative to state protected areas. The implementation of controlled and legalized hunting led to an increase in the area of suitable land available to elephants and other wildlife, which "reversed the problem of habitat loss and helping to maintain a sustained population increase in Zimbabwe's already large elephant population".

A study in the journal Biological Conservation stated that trophy hunting is of "major importance to conservation in Africa by creating economic incentives for conservation over vast areas, including areas which may be unsuitable for alternative wildlife-based land uses such as photographic ecotourism". Financial incentives from trophy hunting effectively more than double the land area that is used for wildlife conservation, relative to what would be conserved relying on national parks alone, according to the study published in Biological Conservation.

According to the American writer and journalist Richard Conniff, Namibia is home to 1,750 of the roughly 5,000 black rhinos surviving in the wild. Namibia's mountain zebra population has increased from 1,000 in 1982 to 27,000 in 2014. Elephants, which are gunned down elsewhere for their ivory, have gone from 15,000 to 20,000 in 1995. Lions, which were on the brink of extinction "from Senegal to Kenya", are increasing in Namibia.

==== Financial support of conservation efforts ====
The International Union for Conservation of Nature recognizes that trophy hunting, when well-managed, can generate significant economic incentives for the conservation of target species and their habitats outside of protected areas.

A study published in the journal Animal Conservation and led by Peter Lindsey of Kenya's Mpala Research Centre concluded that most trophy hunters assure that they are concerned about the conservation, ethical, and social issues that hunting raises. The study interviewed 150 Americans who had hunted in Africa before, or who planned to do so within three years. For example, hunters assure that they were much less willing to hunt in areas where African wild dogs or cheetahs were illegally shot than their hunting operators perceived, and they also showed greater concern for social issues than their operators realized, with a huge willingness to hunt in areas where local people lived and benefited from hunting. Eighty-six percent of hunters told the researchers they preferred hunting in an area where they knew that a portion of the proceeds went back into local communities. A certification system could therefore allow hunters to select those operators who benefit local people and conduct themselves in a conservation-friendly manner.

=== In America ===
The success of conservation efforts such as the Boone and Crockett Club's system for measuring and scoring big game gave hunters a goal and an ethic notions, giving animals sporting chance. Policies such as the Pittman-Robertson Act have collected taxes for over USD $11.5 billion to be destined in preserving natural areas where wildlife populations have boosted since the early 20th century while generating jobs.

== Economic influence ==
According to the U.S. Fish and Wildlife Service, trophy hunting provides an economic incentive for ranchers to continue to breed those species, which reduces the threat of the species' extinction.

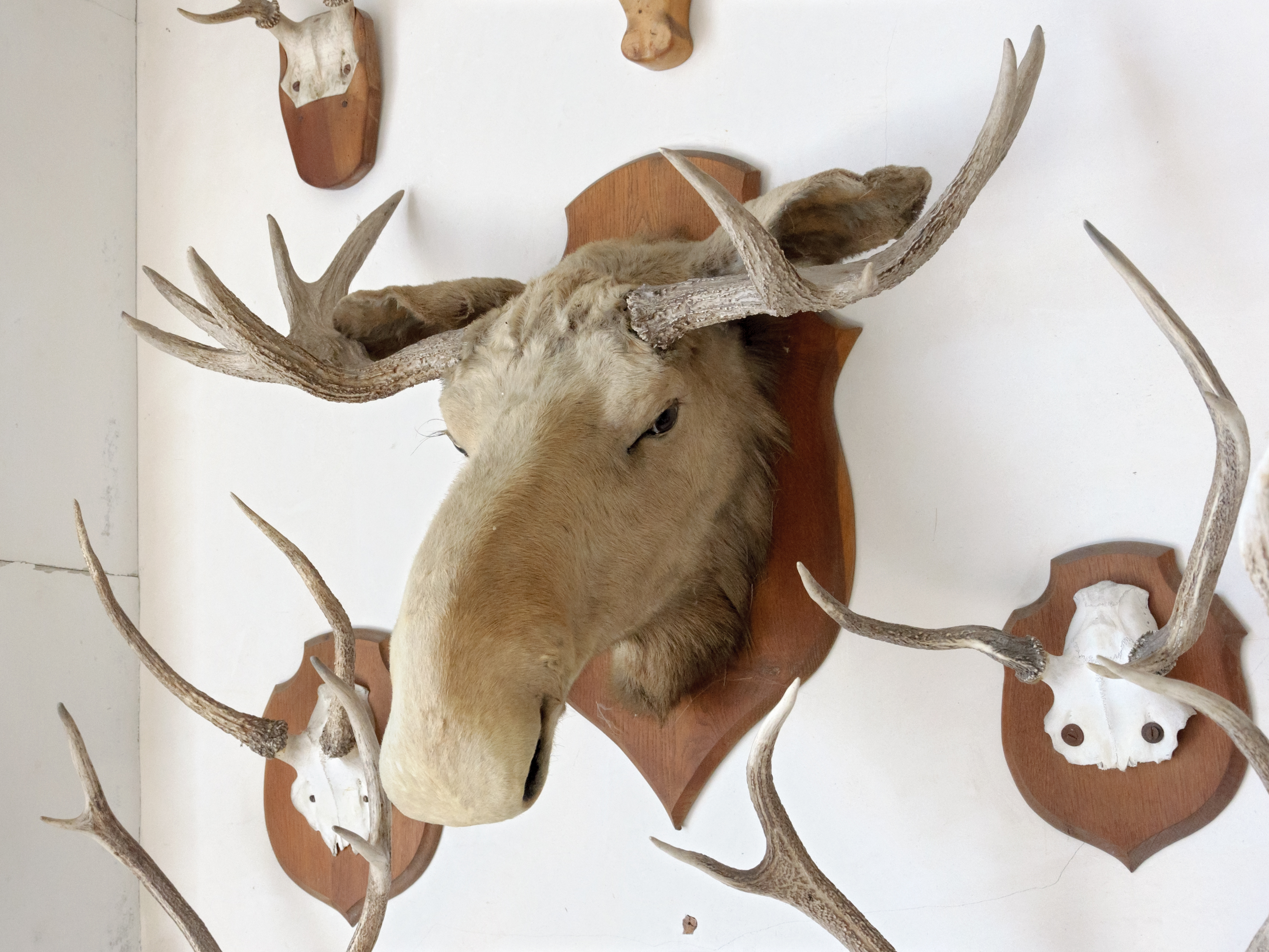
Moose head and deer antlers mounted as hunting trophies

According to a study sponsored by International Council for Game and Wildlife Conservation in partnership with the Food and Agriculture Organization, the revenue generated by hunting tourism in seven Southern African Development Community members in 2008 was approximately US$190 million. Economists at Large, an NGO promoting social justice, animal welfare and sustainability, claim that little of this 190 million reaches communities. Jeff Flocken of the International Fund for Animal Welfare (IFAW), claims that "despite the wild claims that trophy hunting brings millions of dollars in revenue to local people in otherwise poor communities, there is no proof of this. The money that does come into Africa from hunting pales in comparison to the billions generated from tourists who come just to watch wildlife".

However, South African Environmental Affairs Minister Edna Molewa states that the hunting industry has contributed millions to South Africa's economy in past years. In the 2010 hunting season, total revenue of approximately R1.1 billion was generated by the local and trophy hunting industries collectively. "This amount only reflects the revenue generated through accommodation and species fees. The true revenue is therefore substantially higher, as this amount does not even include revenue generated through the associated industries as a result of the multiplier effect", according to Molewa.

According to G. C. Dry, former president of Wildlife Ranching South Africa, wildlife ranches have contributed greatly to the South African economy. He has argued that commercial wildlife ranching is about appropriate land-use and rural development; it is less about animals per se, not a white affluent issue, not a conservation at-all-cost issue, but about economic sustainability. Dry asserts that commercial wildlife ranching is a land-use option that is ecologically appropriate, economically sustainable, politically sensitive, and socially just.

The International Union for Conservation of Nature reports in The baby and the bathwater: trophy hunting, conservation and rural livelihoods that trophy hunting, when well-managed, can be sustainable and generate significant economic incentives for the conservation of target species, but that there are valid concerns about the legality, sustainability and ethics of some hunting practices. The paper concludes that in some contexts, there may be valid and feasible alternatives to trophy hunting that can deliver the above-mentioned benefits, but identifying, funding and implementing these requires genuine consultation and engagement with affected governments, the private sector and communities.

== Social dynamics and motivation ==
Gender studies scholar Sal Renshaw argues that trophy hunting is often not only practiced as a sport, but can be tied to ideas about masculinity. Analyzing deer hunting in North America, she points out that most trophy hunters are men, and the animals they most want to hunt— are almost always the biggest, strongest males (like large bucks or bulls). Hunters will often track a specific male animal for years, learn its habits, and even give it a name. Renshaw suggests that this long, focused hunt for another impressive male involves a form of male-to-male homoerotic desire and admiration.

She argues that the final, public story told about the hunt, the photo of the hunter standing over the dead animal, is one of masculine conquest. But this public story hides the more private experience of the hunt, which was about longing for and pursuing that specific male animal. In this view, killing the animal and turning it into a "trophy" is what allows the hunter's complex feelings of desire during the chase to be reshaped into a simpler story of masculine victory.

== Controversy ==
=== Opposition ===
==== Arguments ====
Opponents voice strong opinions against trophy hunting based on the belief that it is immoral and lacks financial contribution to the communities affected by trophy hunting and to conservation efforts. National Geographic, for example, published a report in 2015 which says government corruption, especially in Zimbabwe, prevents elephant hunting fees from going towards any conservation efforts, with authorities keeping the fees for themselves. Governments also take more wildlife areas to profit from poaching and trophy hunting. Similarly, a 2017 report by the Australian-based Economists at Large says that trophy hunting amounted to less than one percent of tourism revenue in eight African countries. According to an IUCN report from 2009, surrounding communities in West Africa receive little benefit from the hunting-safari business. Some authors found that there was a generally negative perception of the practice in many sectors of the general US populace in 2018. Attention has been drawn both popularly and academically to the ethics of trophy hunting and trophy hunting facilities. Generally speaking, ethical arguments against trophy or sport hunting practices frame them as exploitative and abusive against animals.

Evidence has been found that wild game hunting can impact the reproductive, genetic and social health of animal species, for example by increasing aggression between species members, because hunters often kill the largest or most significant male of a species. The removal of the most significant animals (because of the size of their horns or mane for example) can affect the health of a species population. Rob Knell states that "high-quality males with large secondary sexual traits tend to father a high proportion of the offspring, their 'good genes' can spread rapidly, so populations of strongly sexually selected animals can adapt quickly to new environments. Removing these males reverses this effect and could have serious and unintended consequences. If the population is having to adapt to a new environment and you remove even a small proportion of these high quality males, you could drive it to extinction".

The League Against Cruel Sports writes a "2004 study by the University of Port Elizabeth estimated that eco-tourism on private game reserves generated more than 15 times the income of livestock or game rearing or overseas hunting. Eco-tourism lodges in Eastern Cape Province produce almost 2000 rand (£180) per hectare".

According to Jeff Flocken, the IFAW's analysis of CITES database, 1.7 million animals were killed by trophy hunters between 2004 and 2014, with roughly 200,000 of these being members of threatened species. The U.S. House Committee on Natural Resources in 2016 concluded that trophy hunting may be contributing to the extinction of certain animals. The 25-page report is called Missing the Mark. Nnimmo Bassey, Nigerian environmental activist and director of the Health of Mother Earth Foundation, asserted in 2017 that "wildlife in Africa have been decimated by trophy hunters". Conservationist groups such as IFAW and HSUS assert that trophy hunting is a key factor in the "silent extinction" of giraffes.

==== Positions ====
Trophy hunting is opposed by the group In Defense of Animals on the basis that trophy hunters are not aimed at conservation, they are instead aimed at glory in hunting and killing the biggest and rarest animals. They contend that the trophy hunters are not interested in saving endangered animals and are more than willing to pay the very high prices for permits to kill members of an endangered species. There is an organisation which campaigns against canned hunting in South Africa.

PETA is opposed to trophy hunting because it is unnecessary and cruel and that the pain that the animals suffer is not justified by the enjoyment that the hunters receive.

The League Against Cruel Sports also opposes trophy hunting for the reason that even if the animal that is being hunted for a trophy is not endangered, it is still unjustified to kill them. They respond to claims of economic benefits as false justifications for the continuance of the inhumane sport.

The David Sheldrick Wildlife Trust, an elephant conservation organization, believe that elephants bring in significantly more revenue from tourists who want to see them alive. Their 2013 report stated "alive, they benefit local communities and economies; dead they benefit criminal and even terrorist groups".

=== Support ===
==== Arguments ====
Hunting license fees, hunting tags, and ammunition taxes go to conservation programs. and conservation through hunting, Nationally, the white-tailed deer population has increased from about 500,000 in the early 1900s to 25 million to 30 million today, as well as reintroduction of species. In addition, private groups, such as the National Shooting Sports Foundation, which contributed more than $400,000 in 2005, and smaller private groups also contribute significant funds; for example, the Grand Slam Club Ovis has raised more than $6.3 million to date for the conservation of sheep. Proponents of game and trophy hunting claim that the economic benefits presented by the practice are essential to nations in which ecotourism is not as viable or popular. Additionally, locals in more rural areas of Africa express that there is tension between human communities and certain species that pose dangers to them and their livestock. Members of these communities rely on current hunting regulations that allow them to retaliate or preempt against the threats these species can pose. Programs such as CAMPFIRE (Communal Areas Management Program for Indigenous Resources) in Zimbabwe have been implemented to allow landowners to benefit from the presence of wildlife on their land by marketing it to individuals such as safari owners or game ranch owners, framing wildlife as a renewable resource. Aside from the economic boon presented by the program, CAMPFIRE has also served to mitigate illegal poaching or hunting in certain areas, as well as helping farmers more easily access essential resources that they sometimes have to compete with animal communities for.

==== Positions ====
Organizations that support trophy hunting as a tool for conservation include Boone and Crockett Club, The National Wildlife Federation, The Wilderness Society, The Izzaak Walton League of America, North American Wildlife Foundation, Outdoor Writers Association of America, Ducks Unlimited, The American Forestry Association, Wildlife Legislative Fund of America, Wildlife Management Institute, The Wildlife Society, and IUCN.

The President of Panthera, a conservation group for big cats and their ecosystems, argues that trophy hunting gives African governments economic incentives to leave safari blocks as wilderness, and that hunting remains the most effective tool to protect wilderness in many parts of Africa.

=== Neutrality ===
Organizations that are neutral towards trophy hunting include The National Audubon Society. Defenders of Wildlife is considered by some to have a neutral stance on trophy hunting, but in fact in 2017 they opposed the US Department of the Interior's creation of the International Wildlife Conservation Council to support the sport trophy industry, arguing that the DOI should 'preserve habitat, protect imperilled species, combat wildlife trafficking and promote non-consumptive ways to enjoy wildlife'.

=== Proposed solutions ===
==== Certificate system ====
The development of a certification system, whereby hunting operators are rated on three criteria, would help alleviate shortcomings in the industry:

1. Their commitment to conservation, e.g. by adhering to quotas and contributing to anti-poaching efforts.
2. How much they benefit and involve local people.
3. Whether they comply with agreed ethical standards.

===== Challenges to the certificate system =====
Introducing a certification system however remains challenging because it requires co-operation between hunting operators, conservationists and governments. It also requires difficult questions to be answered, including; what constitutes ethical hunting? Who constitutes local communities and what represents adequate benefits for them? Some researchers also continue to express concern that allowing trophy hunts for endangered animals might send the wrong message to influential people around the world, perhaps with adverse consequences for conservation. For example, it has been suggested that people will contribute less money to conservation organizations because allowing hunting of a species could suggest that it does not need saving.

== In the media ==
The controversy surrounding trophy hunting was further ignited when an American dentist Walter Palmer gained internet infamy when a picture of him and the dead lion Cecil went viral. Palmer is an experienced and avid big-game hunter and reportedly paid over 50,000 US dollars to hunt and kill the lion.

Cecil the lion was one of the most known and studied lions in Zimbabwe. The lion was lured from the park and, after being injured by an arrow and stalked for 40 hours, Cecil was finally killed. Palmer was reportedly attracted to Cecil's rare black mane. Had Cecil been in the park, it would have been illegal to kill him. The actions the dentist and his hired hunter took in luring out of the park were not endorsed by trophy hunting officials in Zimbabwe. While Zimbabwe courts initially ruled his killing to be illegal, charges were ultimately dropped against the hunter Palmer hired.

=== Statistics ===
Trophy hunters imported over 1.26 million trophies into the United States in the 10 years from 2005 to 2014. Canada was the leading source of imported trophies.

From 2005 to 2014, the top ten trophy species imported into the United States were:

1. Snow goose 111,366
2. Mallard duck 104,067
3. Canada goose 70,585
4. American black bear 69,072.
5. Impala 58,423
6. Common wildebeest 52,473
7. Greater kudu 50,759
8. Gemsbok 40,664
9. Springbok 34,023
10. Bontebok 32,771

From 2005 to 2014, the "big five" trophy species imported into the United States, totalling about 32,500 lions, elephants, rhinos, buffalo, and leopards combined, from Africa were:

1. Lion
2. African elephant
3. African leopard
4. Rhinoceros
5. African buffalo

Mexico has a hunting industry valued at approximately $200 million with about 4,000 hunting ranches.

== See also ==
- Animal–industrial complex
- Animal rights
- Big five game
- Big-game hunting
- Deer hunting
- Elephant gun
- Fox hunting
- Green hunting
- International Council for Game and Wildlife Conservation (CIC)
- Junta Nacional de Homologación de Trofeos de Caza
- "The Most Dangerous Game", a classic story famous in the mid twentieth century that was inspired by and explores the philosophy of hunting for sheer pleasure.
- Reindeer hunting in Greenland
- Shooting, shoveling, and shutting up
- White hunter
