= Great Bay National Wildlife Refuge =

Protected area in New Hampshire, United States

- IUCN category IV (habitat/species management area)
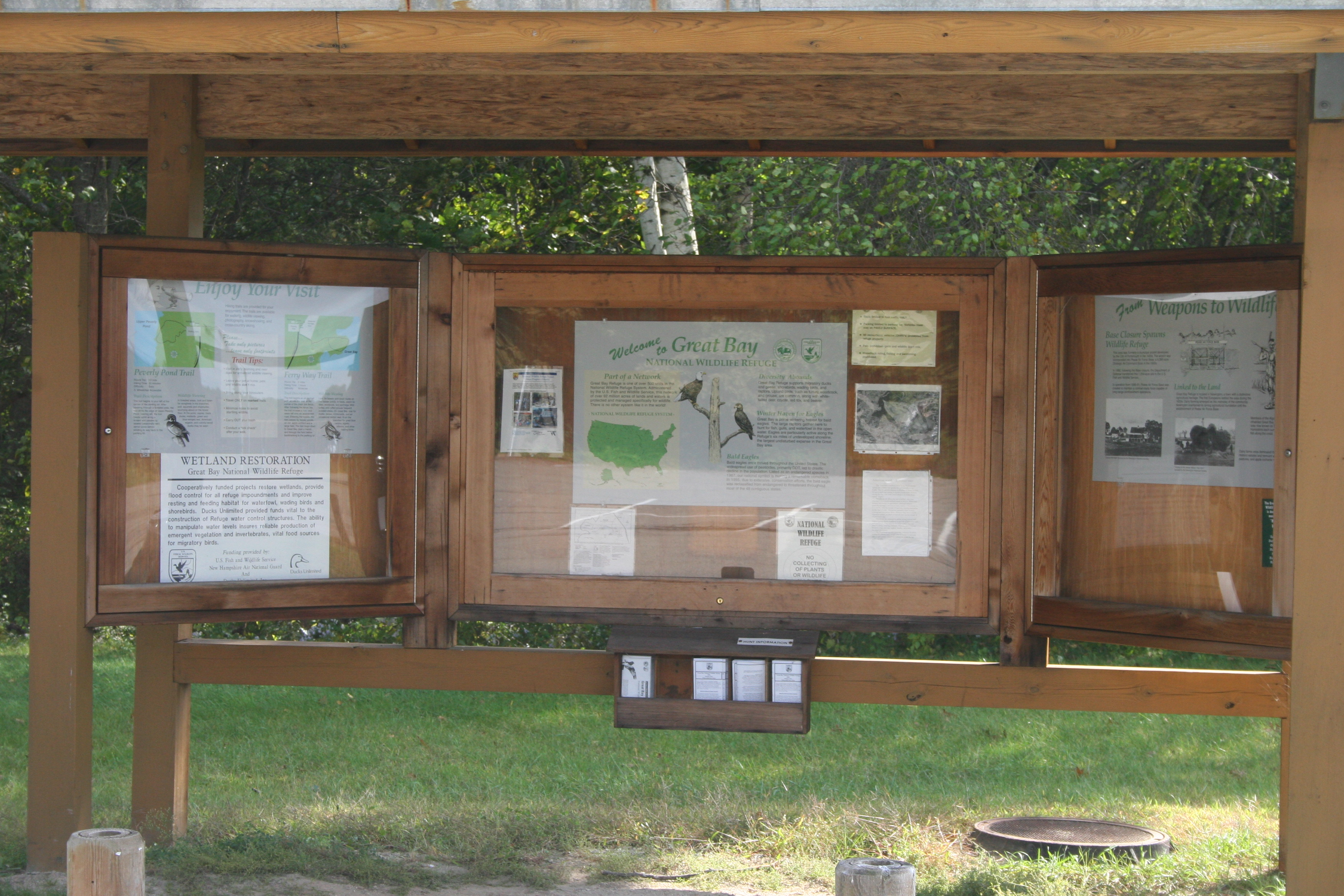
- Information kiosk at Great Bay National Wildlife Refuge

- Location within the United States Location within New Hampshire
- Location: Rockingham County, New Hampshire, United States
- Nearest city: Newington, New Hampshire
- Coordinates: 43°05′15″N 70°50′42″W
- Area: 1,116 acres (4.52 km^{2})
- Established: 1992
- Governing body: U.S. Fish and Wildlife Service
- Website: Great Bay National Wildlife Refuge

Great Bay National Wildlife Refuge was established in 1992 and is located along the eastern shore of New Hampshire's Great Bay in the town of Newington. The area was formerly part of a weapons storage area at Pease Air Force Base, which was closed in 1991. A variety of rich wildlife habitats from uplands to open waters can be found throughout the refuge.

Both Great Bay National Wildlife Refuge, and the Karner Blue butterfly easement in Concord, New Hampshire, which protects important habitat for this federally endangered species, are managed by the Parker River National Wildlife Refuge in Newburyport, Massachusetts. The refuge has a surface area of 1,116 acres (4.52 km^{2}).

== Wildlife and habitat ==
With its open coastal water and abundant prey, the refuge plays a significant role as migration and wintering habitat for the federally protected bald eagle. The bay area also provides prime migration habitat for the peregrine falcon. Many state-protected species use the refuge, including the common loon, pied-billed grebe, osprey, common tern, northern harrier and upland sandpiper. The bay area also serves as New Hampshire's major wintering area for black ducks.

In spring, spring peepers announce the return of warmer weather as myriad shades of green begin to color the trees and shrubs. Flocks of migratory ducks, geese and songbirds drop into the protected waters, fields and forests of the refuge, making this an ideal time for bird watchers and nature enthusiasts to take to the trails. Summer features white-tailed deer, and their speckled fawns might be spied in the meadow along Ferry Way Trail. Turkey families strut boldly along the paths, and occasionally down the road. Birders can enjoy dazzling array of summer visitors such as the Baltimore oriole, goldfinch, ruby-throated hummingbird and yellow warbler. In the fall, various species of trees vie with one another to see which one can create the most stunning colors, a contest which the visitor always wins. The ponds and bay are alive with migratory waterfowl, delighting in a safe resting spot on the trip south for the winter. Beavers and porcupines prepare for the coming winter. River otters, red foxes, bobcats, and coyotes also inhabit this refuge. A stroll down either trail this time of year dazzles the senses. Bald eagles wintering on Great Bay can be seen soaring overhead and black ducks may be observed in patches of open water. Deer and turkey abound and are visible in the undergrowth. Cross-country skiing and snowshoeing can bring visitors close to wildlife in the depths of winter.
