= Pittman–Robertson Federal Aid in Wildlife Restoration Act =

1937 US law funding wildlife projects

The Federal Aid in Wildlife Restoration Act of 1937, most often referred to as the Pittman–Robertson Act for its sponsors, Nevada Senator Key Pittman and Virginia Congressman Absalom Willis Robertson, is an American act that imposes an 11% tax on firearms, ammunition, and archery equipment and distributes the proceeds to state governments for wildlife projects.

The act was signed by Franklin D. Roosevelt on September 2, 1937, and became effective on July 1 of the following year. It has been amended many times, with several of the major amendments taking place during the 1970s and the most recent in 2000. Prior to the creation of the Pittman–Robertson Act, many species of wildlife were driven to or near extinction by commercial/market hunting pressure and/or habitat degradation from humans. The act created an excise tax that provides funds to each state to manage such animals and their habitats. Notable species that have come back from the brink since the implementation of this act include white-tailed deer, wild turkeys, and wood ducks.

== Overview ==
The Pittman–Robertson Act took over a preexisting 11% excise tax on firearms and ammunition. Instead of going into the U.S. Treasury as it had done in the past, the money generated by the tax is instead given to the Secretary of the Interior to distribute to the states. The Secretary determines how much to give to each state based on a formula that takes into account both the area of the state and its number of licensed hunters.

States must fulfill certain requirements to use the money apportioned to them. None of the money from their hunting license sales may be used by anyone other than the states' own fish and game departments. Plans for what to do with the money must be submitted to and approved by the Secretary of the Interior. Acceptable options include research, surveys, management of wildlife and/or habitat, and acquisition or lease of land. Once a plan has been approved, the state must pay the full cost and is later reimbursed for up to 75% of that cost through the funds generated by the Pittman–Robertson Act. The 25% of the cost that the state must pay generally comes from its hunting license sales. If, for whatever reason, any of the federal money does not get spent, after two years that money is then reallocated to the Migratory Bird Conservation Act.

In the 1970s, amendments to the act created a 10% tax on handguns and their ammunition and accessories as well as an 11% tax on archery equipment. It was also mandated that half of the money from each of the new taxes be used to educate and train hunters by the creation and maintenance of hunter safety classes and shooting/target ranges.

== Results ==
This piece of legislation has provided states with funding for research and projects that would otherwise have been unaffordable. According to a U.S. Fish and Wildlife Service web page that was updated in January 2010, over two billion dollars of federal aid has been generated through the program, which in turn means that states have maintained their 25% contributions with over 500 million dollars.

The habitat acquisition and improvement made possible by this money has allowed some species with large ranges, such as American black bears, elk, and cougars, to expand their ranges beyond their normal boundaries prior to the implementation of the act. Important game populations such as white-tailed deer and several species of the avian order Galliformes have also had a chance to recover and expand their populations.

Critics of the legislation claim that state Fish and Wildlife agencies allocate funds primarily towards the creation of new hunting opportunities. There is a feeling among hunters, in general, that the tax money collected from firearms purchases should benefit hunters rather than wildlife conservation programs, given that it is the hunters who pay the tax and establish the funding.

== Economics ==
The idea behind the act is that by creating more and better hunting experiences for people through habitat management and hunter education, more taxable items will be purchased, which would in turn provide more funding for management and improvement. The habitat improvement may also stimulate the ecotourism sector of the economy by creating jobs in areas where people tend to visit for hunting or aesthetic reasons.

One source shows hunters spending around $10 billion a year on everything they need for their hunting trips. A different source found that hunters spend between $2.8 and $5.2 billion a year on taxable merchandise. This generates between $177 and $324 million a year in P–R money.

Another source estimated that hunters contribute about $3.5 million a day to conservation by purchasing taxable items and hunting licenses. One study showed an extremely high return on investment for firearm manufacturers: 823% to 1588% depending on the year.

== Related legislation ==
=== Similar legislation ===
The Pittman–Robertson Act was so successful that in the 1950s, a similar act was written for the protection of fish species. This act was titled the Federal Aid in Sports Fish Restoration Act. As with its wildlife counterpart, the name of this act is generally shortened by reducing it to the names of those who sponsored it, and so it is generally referred to as the Dingell–Johnson Act, or DJ.

=== Legislative oversight ===
In 2000, alleging that the Pittman-Robertson Act sportsman's conservation trust funds were being mismanaged, U.S. Representative Don Young (R-Alaska), a National Rifle Association of America board member and sportsman, introduced the Wildlife and Sports Fish Restoration Programs Improvement Act. The act passed the House 423–2 and became law on November 1, 2000, and defines in what manner the money can be spent. In particular, it earmarked funds to be spent on hunter education programmes, the construction of shooting ranges and sport fish restoration projects.

=== Proposed amendments ===
On November 21, 2013, U.S. Representative Robert E. Latta (R, OH-5) introduced an omnibus bill called the Sportsmen’s Heritage And Recreational Enhancement Act of 2013 (H.R. 3590; 113th Congress). Title II of that bill, the Target Practice and Marksmanship Training Support Act, would amend the Pittman–Robertson Wildlife Restoration Act to: (1) authorize a state to pay up to 90% of the costs of acquiring land for, expanding, or constructing a public target range; (2) authorize a state to elect to allocate 10% of a specified amount apportioned to it from the Federal Aid to Wildlife Restoration fund for such costs; (3) limit the federal share of such costs under such Act to 90%; and (4) require amounts provided for such costs under such Act to remain available for expenditure and obligation for five fiscal years. The bill passed the House of Representatives on February 5, 2014.
