= Dingell–Johnson Act =

The Dingell–Johnson Act, also called the Federal Aid in Sport Fish Restoration Act, is a United States federal law signed into law by President Harry S. Truman from 1950 that authorizes the Secretary of the Interior to provide financial assistance for state fish restoration and management plans and projects. The Act has been amended 11 times, the last time in 1992.
