= In Our Time (short story collection) =

1925 Ernest Hemingway collection

1924 Three Mountains Press Paris edition of in our time

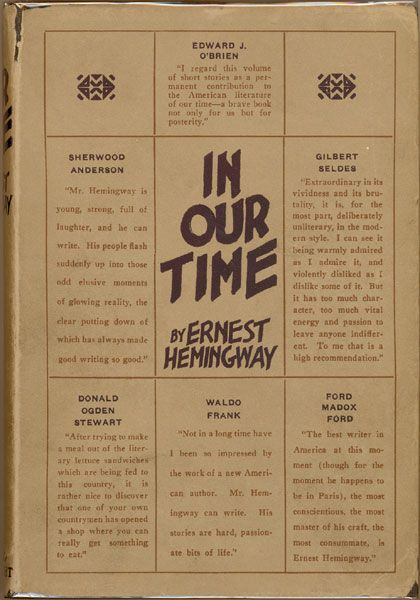
1925 Boni & Liveright New York edition of In Our Time

In Our Time is the title of Ernest Hemingway's first collection of short stories, published in 1925 by Boni & Liveright, New York, and of a collection of vignettes published in 1924 in France titled in our time. Its title is derived from the English Book of Common Prayer, "Give peace in our time, O Lord".

The collection's publication history was complex. It began with six prose vignettes published by Ezra Pound in the 1923 edition of The Little Review, to which Hemingway added twelve vignettes and had published in Paris in 1924 as the in our time edition (with a lower-case title). He wrote fourteen short stories for the 1925 edition, including "Indian Camp" and "Big Two-Hearted River", two of his best-known Nick Adams stories. He composed "On the Quai at Smyrna" for the 1930 edition.

The stories' themes – of alienation, loss, grief, separation – continue the work Hemingway began with the vignettes, which include descriptions of acts of war, bullfighting and current events. The collection is known for its spare language and oblique depiction of emotion, through a style known as Hemingway's "theory of omission" (iceberg theory). According to his biographer Michael Reynolds, among Hemingway's canon, "none is more confusing ... for its several parts – biographical, literary, editorial, and bibliographical – contain so many contradictions that any analysis will be flawed."

Hemingway's writing style attracted attention, with literary critic Edmund Wilson saying it was "of the first distinction"; the 1925 edition of In Our Time is considered one of Hemingway's early masterpieces.

== Background and publication history ==
E. O. Hoppé's 1920 photograph of Ezra Pound, taken two years before the poet instructed Hemingway on writing in the imagist style

Hemingway was 19 years old when in 1918, shortly after he was posted to the Italian Front as a Red Cross ambulance driver, he sustained a severe wound from mortar fire. For the next four months, he recuperated in a Milan hospital, where he fell in love with nurse Agnes von Kurowsky. Shortly after his return to the US, she informed him that she was engaged to an Italian officer. Soon after, he turned to journalism.

A few months after marrying Hadley Richardson in 1921, he and his wife moved to Paris on the strength of her private income and an agreement with the Toronto Star that would supply them with freelance articles on whatever caught his fancy. In time the paper asked him to write features on the Greco-Turkish War and the situation in post-war Germany. In Paris he befriended Gertrude Stein, Ezra Pound, F. Scott Fitzgerald, James Joyce, Ford Madox Ford, Morley Callaghan, and John Dos Passos, establishing a particularly strong friendship with Pound. Pound's influence extended to promoting the young author, placing six of Hemingway's poems in the magazine Poetry. In August he asked Hemingway to contribute a small volume to the modernist series he was editing, and Bill Bird was publishing for his Three Mountains Press, which Pound envisioned as the "Inquest into the state of the modern English language". Pound's commission turned Hemingway's attention toward fiction, and had profound consequences on his development as a writer.

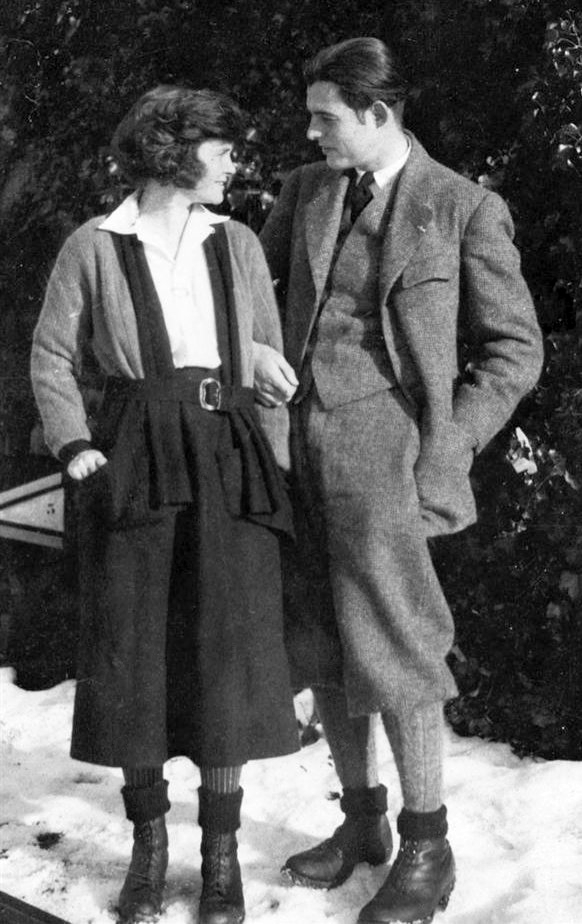
Hemingway and his wife Hadley on winter holiday in Chamby (Montreux), 1922

On December 2, 1922, nearly all of Hemingway's early writing – his juvenilia and apprentice fiction, including the duplicates – was lost. He had been sent on assignment to cover the Conference of Lausanne, leaving Hadley, who was sick with a cold, behind in Paris. In Lausanne he spent days covering the conference, and the evenings drinking with Lincoln Steffens. Before setting off to meet him in Switzerland, thinking he would want to show his work to Steffens, Hadley packed all his manuscripts into a valise which was subsequently stolen at Gare de Lyon train station. Although angry and upset, Hemingway went with Hadley to Chamby (Montreux) to ski, and apparently did not post a reward for the recovery of the valise. An early story, "Up in Michigan", survived the loss because Gertrude Stein had told him it was unprintable (in part because of a seduction scene), and he had stuffed it in a drawer.

A month later in a letter to Pound, he mentioned that "You, naturally, would say, "Good" etc. But don't say it to me. I ain't reached that mood." In his reply, Pound pointed out that Hemingway had only lost "the time it will ... take you to rewrite the parts you can remember ... If the middle, i.e., FORM, of the story is right then one ought to be able to reassemble it from memory ... If the thing wobbles and won't reform ... then it never wd. have been right." Critics are uncertain whether he took Pound's advice and re-created existing stories or whether everything he wrote after the loss of the suitcase was new.

=== The Little Review ===
In February 1923, Hemingway and Hadley visited Italy; in Rapallo they met Pound, who almost certainly commissioned the prose pieces for the literary magazine The Little Review during their visit. Still upset at the loss of his work, Hemingway had not written since the previous December, but he slowly wrote six new paragraphs, submitting them for the March deadline. Hemingway scholar Milton Cohen says at that point Hemingway knew the pieces for The Little Review would "govern the remainder of the book that Pound had commissioned."

The six prose pieces ranged from 75 to 187 words and were about war and bullfighting. The battle scenes came from the experiences of Hemingway's friend Chink Dorman-Smith who was at the Battle of Mons; the matador story originated from another friend, Mike Strater. Hemingway himself witnessed the events which inspired the story about the Greco-Turkish War. The last of the series was taken from news of the execution of six Greek cabinet ministers during the Trial of the Six.

The Little Review's "Exiles" edition, scheduled to be published in the spring, was finally released in October 1923, leading with Hemingway's work. It featured pieces from modernists such as Gertrude Stein, George Antheil, E. E. Cummings and Jean Cocteau. Hemingway's vignettes were titled "In Our Time", suggesting a cohesive set.

=== in our time ===
In June 1923, Hemingway took Hadley, with Robert McAlmon and Bird, to Spain where he found a new passion with his first visits to the bullfights. During the summer he wrote five new vignettes (chapters 12–16), all about bullfighting, finishing the last two on his return to Paris in August. That summer he also honed new narrative techniques in chapters 7–11. In August he reported to Pound that he was about to begin the last two pieces (chapters 17 and 18), implemented revisions that Pound suggested, and sent the manuscript to Bill Bird. Then he left Paris with Hadley (who was pregnant with their first child) for Toronto, where he was living when Bird finished producing the book.

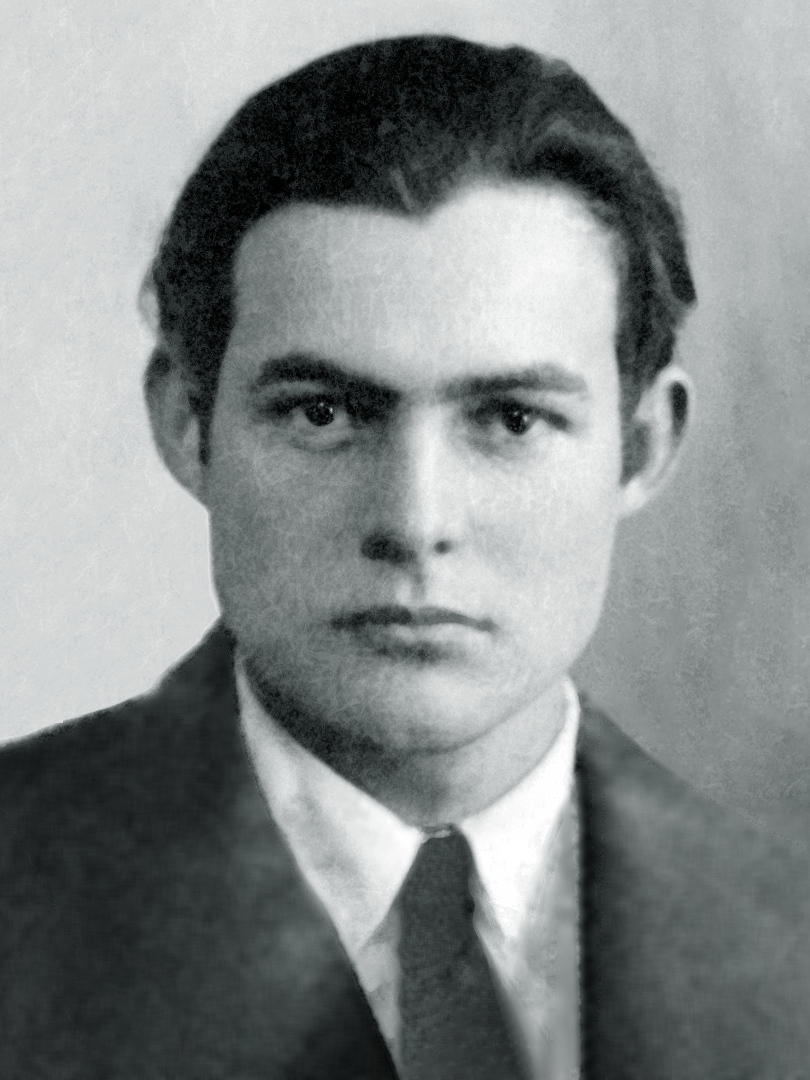
Hemingway's 1923 passport photograph

The pieces he submitted to Bird were at first untitled (Pound called the submission Blank); later the title in our time – from the Book of Common Prayer – was chosen. Bird printed the volume on a hand-press with handmade paper, telling Hemingway, "I'm going to pull something really fancy with your book". The book contained eighteen vignettes and only thirty-one pages; each one was laid out with plenty of white space, highlighting the brevity of the prose. According to Cohen, the "visual suddenness intensifies its narrative abruptness, heightens the shock of violence, and the chillingly matter-of-fact tone". The book's presentation was intended as unconventional, with its use of lowercase throughout and lack of quotation marks. When challenged by American editors over the use of lowercase in the titles, Hemingway admitted that it could be seen as "silly and affected".

Bird designed the distinctive dust jacket – a collage of newspaper articles in four languages – to highlight that the vignettes carried a sense of journalism or news. The frontispiece is a woodcut portrait of the author, which during the printing process bled through to the next page, ruining more than half the print run so that only 170 of the 300 copies printed were deemed suitable to sell. The rest were sent to reviewers and friends.

=== In Our Time ===
A year later Hemingway was back in Paris, where he wrote some of his best short stories and told Scott Fitzgerald that, of the new material, "Indian Camp" and "Big Two-Hearted River" were superior. Over the next six months, one of his most productive periods according to critic Jackson Benson, he wrote eight short stories. The stories were combined with the earlier vignettes and sent to Boni & Liveright in New York toward the end of the year. In March he was in Schruns, Austria when the acceptance cable and $100 advance arrived, with a request to option his next two books. Directly afterward, he received a letter from Max Perkins of Scribner's, who had read Bird's Paris edition and thought it lacked commercial appeal, and queried whether the young writer had stories to offer to bolster the collection. In his reply, Hemingway explained that he had already entered a contract with Boni & Liveright. When he received the contract for the book, Boni & Liveright requested that "Up in Michigan" be dropped for fear it might be censored; in response Hemingway wrote "The Battler" to replace the earlier story.

The 1925 New York edition contained the fourteen short stories with the vignettes interwoven as "interchapters". Boni & Liveright published the book on October 5, 1925, with a print-run of 1335 copies, costing $2 each, which saw four reprints. The firm designed a "modish" dust jacket, similar to the Paris edition, and elicited endorsements from Ford Madox Ford, Gilbert Seldes, John Dos Passos, and Donald Ogden Stewart. Boni & Liveright claimed American copyright for the works published in France.

Hemingway was disappointed with the publisher's marketing efforts, and that December he complained to Boni & Liveright about their handling of the book, citing a lack of advertising, claiming they could have had "20,000 in sales" and that he should have requested a $1000 advance. He later broke his contract with the firm, signing with Max Perkins at Scribner's the following year. Scribner's bought the rights from Boni & Liveright, releasing the second American edition on October 24, 1930, which saw one reprint. The Scribner's edition included an introduction by Edmund Wilson and Hemingway's "Introduction by the Author", which was renamed as "On the Quai at Smyrna" in the 1938 publication of The Fifth Column and the First Forty-Nine Stories. When In Our Time was re-issued in 1955, "On the Quai at Smyrna" replaced "Indian Camp" as the first story.

== Contents ==
=== 1924 edition ===
Nick sat against the wall of the church where they had dragged him to be clear of machine-gun fire in the street. Both legs stuck out awkwardly. He had been hit in the spine. The day was very hot. Rinaldi, big-backed, his equipment sprawling, lay face downward against the wall ... The pink wall of the house opposite had fallen out from the roof ... Two Austrian dead lay in the rubble in the shade of the house. Up the street were other dead. Things were getting forward in the town.

— Ernest Hemingway, "Chapter 7", in our time

The 1924 in our time collection consists of eighteen vignettes. Five center on World War I (Chapters 1, 4, 5, 7, 8), and six on bullfighting (Chapters 2 and 12 to 16); the others center around news stories. Chapter 10 is the longest; it details a soldier's affair with a Red Cross nurse, and is based on Hemingway's relationship with Agnes von Kurowsky. The piece about a robbery and murder in Kansas City originated in a newspaper story Hemingway covered as a cub reporter at The Kansas City Star; it is followed by the story of the public hanging of the Chicago mobster Sam Cardinelli. The last, "L'Envoi", is about the King of Greece and Sophia of Prussia giving an interview in the palace garden during the Revolution.

=== 1925 edition ===
The 1925 New York edition begins with the short stories "Indian Camp" and "The Doctor and the Doctor's Wife". The two are linked thematically; they are set in Michigan and introduce Nick Adams. Nick witnesses an emergency caesarean section and a suicide in the first; the tension between his parents in the second. The next story, "The End of Something", is also set in Michigan, and details Nick's break-up with his girlfriend; "The Three-Day Blow" follows, where Nick and a friend get drunk. "The Battler" is about Nick's chance encounter with a prize-fighter. "A Very Short Story", which was the longest vignette in the previous edition, comes next and is followed by "Soldier's Home", set in Oklahoma, and "The Revolutionist", set in Italy. The next three are set in Europe and detail unhappy marriages: "Mr. and Mrs. Elliot", "Cat in the Rain" and "Out of Season". They are placed before Nick's reappearance in "Cross Country Snow", which takes place in Switzerland. The penultimate "My Old Man" concerns horse-racing in Italy and Paris, and the volume ends with the two-part Nick Adams story "Big Two-Hearted River", set in Michigan. The vignettes were re-ordered and placed between the short stories as interchapters.

== Structure ==
Whether the collection has a unified structure has been a source of debate among Hemingway critics. According to Reynolds the collection should be "read as a predictable step in any young author's career" and the pieces considered as "discrete units". Yet he admits that Hemingway's remarks, and the complexity of the structure, suggests the stories and vignettes were meant to be an interconnected whole. In a letter to Pound in August 1923, Hemingway told him he had finished the full set of eighteen vignettes, saying of them, "When they are read together, they all hook up ... The bulls start, then reappear, then finish off. The war starts clear and noble just like it did ... gets close and blurred and finished with the feller who goes home and gets clap." He went on to say of "in our time" that "it has form all right". On October 18, 1924, he wrote to Edmund Wilson, "Finished the book of 14 stories with a chapter of 'In Our Time' between each story – that is the way they are meant to go – to give the picture of the whole before examining it in detail".

Benson notes that all the fiction Hemingway had produced was included in the collection, that the connection between stories and vignettes is tenuous at best, and that Pound had an influence in editing the final product. Benson calls the work a "prose poem of terror", where looking for connections is meaningless. Conversely, Linda Wagner-Martin suggests the unrelenting tone of horror and somber mood unify the separate pieces. One of its early reviewers, D. H. Lawrence, referred to it as a "fragmentary novel".

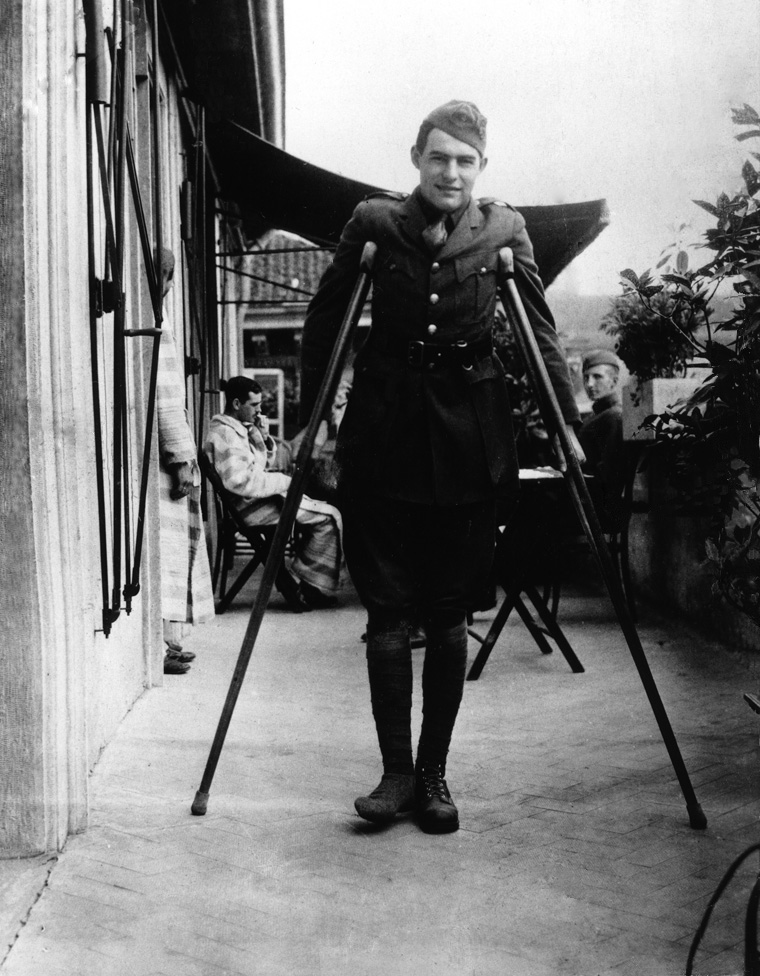
Ernest Hemingway in a Milan hospital, 1918. The 19-year-old author is recovering from World War I shrapnel wounds.

Hemingway scholar Wendolyn Tetlow says that from its inception the collection was written with a rhythmic and lyrical unity reminiscent of Pound's "Hugh Selwyn Mauberley" and T.S. Eliot's The Waste Land. The carefully crafted sequence continues in the 1925 edition, beginning with the first five Nick Adams stories, which are about violence and doom, empty relationships and characters lacking self-awareness. The first two stories, "Indian Camp" and "The Doctor and the Doctor's Wife", can be read as an exercise in counterpoint, where feelings of loss, anger, and evil are ignored and repressed. "The End of Something" and "The Three-Day Blow" also form a pair; in the first Nick breaks up with his girlfriend, in the second he gets drunk and denies the relationship has ended, convincing himself that it will all work out. This state of denial continues in "The Battler", the fifth story; when faced with violence Nick will not recognize that he is in danger. "A Very Short Story", about betrayal, and wounding, ends the sequence according to Tetlow, who suggests these are stories in which Hemingway writes about the "most bitter feelings of loss and disillusionment". The characters face loss with inner strength, stoicism and a sense of acceptance; they build strength in the stories that come after, gaining self-awareness as they accept the futility and pain of life. The collection ends with "Big Two-Hearted River", in which Nick finds tranquility, perhaps even happiness, in solitude. Wagner-Martin notes that "it is this essential tranquility that in retrospect heightens the tension and sorrow of the preceding pieces."

Another Hemingway scholar, Jim Berloon, disagrees with Tetlow, writing that its only unity consists of similarities in tone and style and the recurrence of the Nick Adams character. Although the first vignettes share a common thread about the war, each is distinctly framed, weakening any structural unity that might have existed. He blames the war, saying that it was too hard for Hemingway to write about it cohesively, that it was "too large, terrible, and mentally overwhelming to grasp in its entirety". Instead, he says, Hemingway wrote fragments, "discrete glimpses into hell ... like the wreckage of battle lit up from a shell burst at night." The structure apparent in the 1924 collection of vignettes is lost in the later edition because the short stories seem to bear little if any relationship to the interchapters, shattering the carefully constructed order. The sense of discordance is intensified because the action is about unnamed men and soldiers, only referred to with pronouns, and unspecified woundings. The characters are transformed through circumstances and settings, where danger exists overtly, on the battlefield, or, in one case, by a chance sexual encounter in a Chicago taxi.

Critic E. R. Hageman notes the 1924 in our time vignettes are linked chronologically, spanning ten years from 1914 to 1923, and the choices were deliberate. World War I and the aftermath were "the experience of his generation, the experience that dumped his peers and his elders into graves, shell-holes, hospitals, and onto gallows. These were 'in our time', Hemingway is saying, and he remarks the significant and the insignificant."

== Themes ==
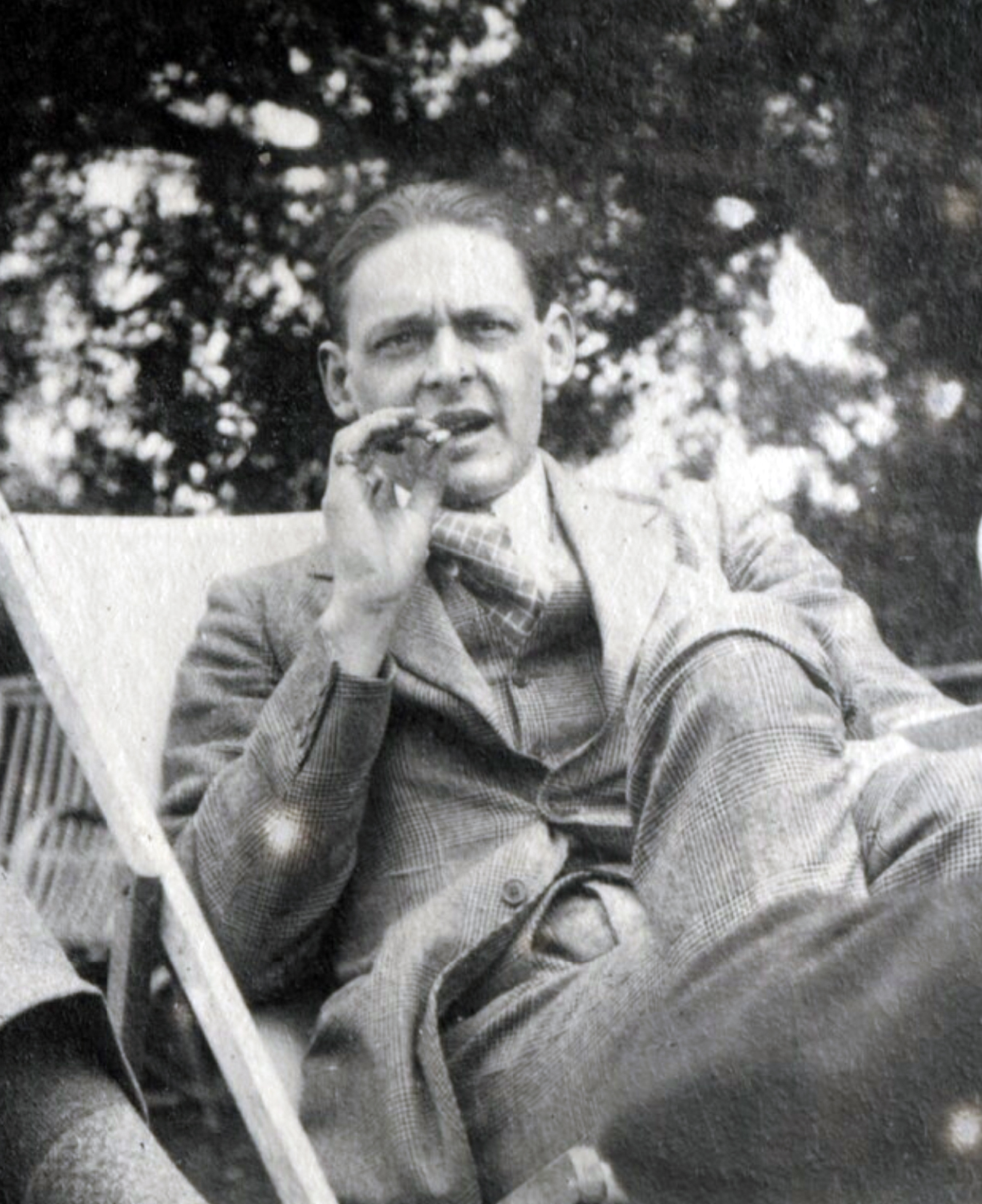
T. S. Eliot, shown in a 1923 photograph, influenced Hemingway's style.

The stories contain themes that Hemingway would revisit throughout his career, including initiation rites, early love, marital difficulties, disappointment in family life, and the significance of male camaraderie. The collection depicts a world of violence, war, suffering, executions—one stripped of romance, where even "the hero of the bullfight chapter pukes." Hemingway's portrayal of the early 20th century reflects a time "out of season," dominated by war, death, and unfulfilling relationships.

Alienation in the modern world is particularly evident in Out of Season, which bears similarities to Eliot's The Waste Land. Eliot's Waste Land motif recurs throughout much of Hemingway's early fiction, but is most notable in this collection, The Sun Also Rises (1926), and A Farewell to Arms (1929). Hemingway adopted Eliot's technique of using imagery to evoke emotion. Literary scholar Jackson J. Benson attributes the thematic and stylistic similarities between Hemingway and Eliot to the influence of Ezra Pound, who edited both writers.

Motifs and themes reappear, the most obvious being the juxtaposition of life and death. There are some recurring images such as water and darkness – places of safety. Benson notes how, after reading the first few vignettes and stories, readers "realize we are in hell." Hemingway conjures a world where "the weak are pitilessly exploited by the strong, and ... all functions of life ... promise only pain."

Hemingway's semi-autobiographical character Nick Adams is "vital to Hemingway's career", writes Mellow, and generally his character reflects Hemingway's experiences. Nick, who features in eight of the stories, is an alter ego, a means for Hemingway to express his own experiences, from the first story '"Indian Camp" which features Nick as a child. According to critic Howard Hannum, the trauma of birth and suicide Hemingway paints in "Indian Camp" rendered a leitmotif that gave Hemingway a unified framework for the Nick Adams stories. It is followed by "The Doctor and the Doctor's Wife," which Mellows says is written with a sense of "hostility and resignation," and sheds a rare light on Hemingway's childhood. In the story, 12-year-old Nick hides from his angry and violent father; the mother, a Christian Scientist, is distanced, withdrawn in her bedroom, reading Science and Health.

"Big Two-Hearted River", the concluding and climactic piece, details Nick's return from war. In it Nick knows he has left his needs behind; Debra Moddelmog highlights how all of the Nick storylines, and most of the others in the collection, are about a "flight from pain". She believes that Gertrude Stein's definition of the Lost Generation applies to In Our Time as much, if not more so, as to The Sun Also Rises; that "Nick seems to believe that the things most worth having and caring about – life, love, ideals, companions, peace, freedom – will be lost sooner or later, and he is not sure how to cope with this assurance, except through irony, bitterness, and, sometimes, wishful thinking." In the last story he learns to come to terms with the loss of his friends, and acknowledges "all the loss he has experienced in the last few years and, equally important, the loss he has come to expect."

== Style ==
Biographer Mellow believes that In Our Time is Hemingway's most experimental book, particularly with its unusual narrative form. The vignettes have no traditional sense of narrative; they begin in the middle. Shifting points-of-view and narrative perspectives disguise autobiographical details.

Pound taught Hemingway to write sparingly. Pound wrote to him that "anything put on top of the subject is BAD ... The subject is always interesting enough without blankets." Hemingway would write in A Moveable Feast (published posthumously in 1964), "If I started to write elaborately, like someone presenting or introducing something, I found that I could cut that scrollwork or ornament out and throw it away and start with the first true simple declarative sentence I had written." In Our Time was written during the author's experimentation phase, his first attempts towards a minimalist style. The prose in "Indian Camp" and "Big Two-Hearted River" is sharper and more abstract than in other stories, and by employing simple sentences and diction – techniques he learned writing for newspapers – the prose is timeless with an almost mythic quality, explains Benson. The tightly compressed sentence structure emulates and reflects Pound's imagist style, bringing to prose narrative the stripped-down style Pound famously established in 1913 with poems such as "In a Station of the Metro". Thomas Strychacz compares Hemingway's prose to Pound's poetry, writing, "Hemingway's terse, tight-lipped, tightly wound fragments are equally extraordinary in their dramatic intensity."

The taut style is apparent from the first vignette, in which a brigade of drunken soldiers march to Champagne. With supreme understatement he alludes to the Second Battle of Champagne, an offensive lasting from September to December 25, 1915, in which 120,000 French troops were killed in the first three weeks:

Everybody was drunk. The whole battery was drunk going along the road in the dark. We were going to Champagne. The lieutenant kept riding his horse out into the fields and saying to him, "I'm drunk, I tell you, mon vieux. Oh I am so soused." We went along the road all night in the dark and the adjutant kept riding up alongside my kitchen and saying, "You must put it out. It is dangerous. It will be observed." We were fifty kilometers from the front but the adjutant worried about the fire in my kitchen. It was funny going along that road. That was when I was a kitchen corporal.

— Ernest Hemingway, "Chapter 1", in our time.

The vignette opening with the words "We were in a garden at Mons" is equally understated; the narrator writes, "The first German I saw climbed up over the garden wall. We waited till he got one leg over then potted him. He ... looked awfully surprised". The description repeats images, is dispassionate and warps logic, according to Strychacz.

These set the model for flash fiction – fiction that is condensed without unnecessary descriptive detail. In A Moveable Feast Hemingway wrote that "Out of Season", written in 1924, was the first story where he applied the theory of omission, known as his Iceberg Theory. He explained that the stories in which he left out the most important parts, such as not writing about the war in "Big Two-Hearted River", are the best of his early fiction. As Carlos Baker describes the technique, the hard facts float above water while the supporting structure, including the symbolism, operates out of sight. Hemingway wrote in the preface to Death in the Afternoon, a writer may choose what to include and what to omit from a story.

If a writer of prose knows enough of what he is writing about he may omit things that he knows and the reader, if the writer is writing truly enough, will have a feeling of those things as strongly as though the writer had stated them. The dignity of movement of an ice-berg is due to only one-eighth of it being above water. A writer who omits things because he does not know them only makes hollow places in his writing.

— Ernest Hemingway, Death in the Afternoon

== Reception and legacy ==
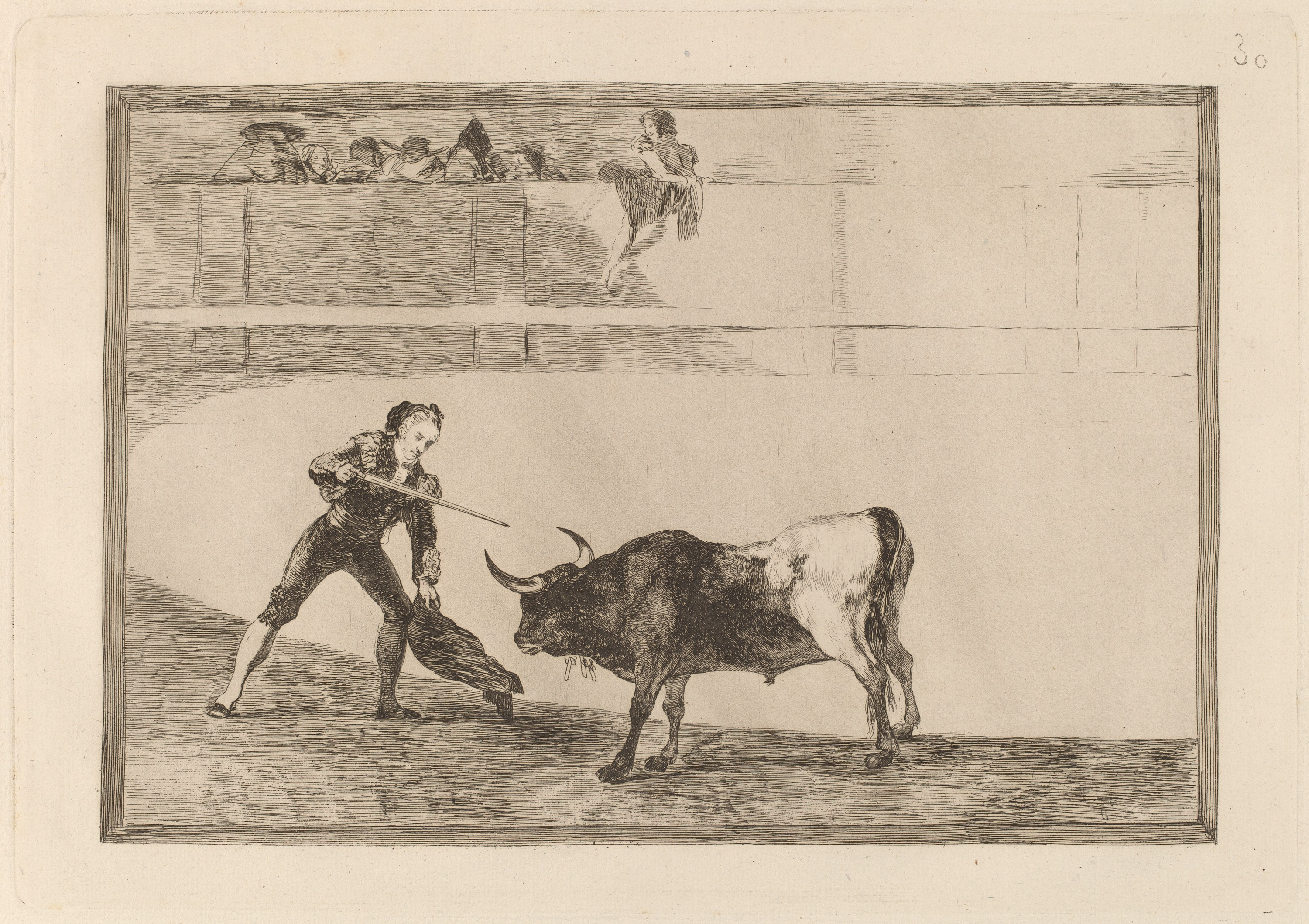
Hemingway's bullfighting scenes were compared to Francisco Goya's art.

Hemingway's writing style attracted attention after the release of the Parisian edition of in our time in 1924. Edmund Wilson described the writing as "of the first distinction", writing that the bullfight scenes were like Francisco Goya paintings, that the author "had almost invented a form of his own", and it had "more artistic dignity than any written by an American about the period of the war."

The 1925 edition of In Our Time is considered one of Hemingway's masterpieces. Reviewers and critics noticed, and the collection received positive reviews on its publication. The New York Times described the language as "fibrous and athletic, colloquial and fresh, hard and clean, his very prose seems to have an organic being of its own". A reviewer for Time wrote, "Ernest Hemingway is somebody; a new honest un-'literary' transcriber of life – a Writer." Reviewing for The Bookman, F. Scott Fitzgerald wrote Hemingway was an "augury" of the age and that the Nick Adams stories were "temperamentally new" in American fiction.

His parents, however, described the book as "filth", disturbed by the passage in "A Very Short Story" which tells of a soldier contracting gonorrhea after a sexual encounter with a sales girl in a taxicab. Bird sent five copies to them which were promptly returned, eliciting a letter from Hemingway, who complained, "I wonder what was the matter, whether the pictures were too accurate and the attitude toward life not sufficiently distorted to please who ever bought the book or what?"

In Our Time was ignored and forgotten by literary critics for decades. Benson attributes the neglect to various factors. The Sun Also Rises, published the next year, is considered the more important book followed fairly rapidly by the popular A Farewell to Arms two years after in 1928; critics' general assumption seemed to be that Hemingway's talent lay in writing prose rather than "sophisticated, complex design"; and In Our Time stories were combined with subsequent collections in the publication of The Fifth Column and the First Forty-Nine Stories in 1938, drawing the critics' attention away from the book as an entity, toward the individual stories. In 1962, when Scribner's released the paperback edition of In Our Time, it began to be taught in American universities, and by the end of the decade, the first critical study of the collection appeared. Benson describes the collection as the author's first "major achievement"; Wagner-Martin as "his most striking work, both in terms of personal involvement and technical innovation."

== Sources ==
- Baker, Carlos. (1972). Hemingway: The Writer as Artist. (4th edition). Princeton: Princeton University Press. ISBN 978-0-691-01305-3
- Barloon, Jim. (2005). "Very Short Stories: The Miniaturization of War in Hemingway's 'In Our Time'". The Hemingway Review. Vol. 24, No. 2.
- Benson, Jackson. (1983). "Patterns of Connections and their development in Hemingway's In Our Time". In Reynolds, Michael. (ed). Critical essays on Ernest Hemingway's In Our Time. Boston: G. K. Hall. ISBN 978-0-8161-8637-2
- Benson, Jackson (1975). "Ernest Hemingway as Short Story Writer". In Benson, Jackson. (ed). The Short Stories of Ernest Hemingway: Critical Essays. Durham NC: Duke University Press. ISBN 978-0-8223-0320-6
- Bickford, Sylvester. (1992). "Hemingway's Italian Waste Land: The Complex Unity of 'Out of Season'". In Beegel, Susan F. (ed). Hemingway's Neglected Short Fiction. Tuscaloosa: Alabama University Press. ISBN 978-0-8173-0586-4
- Cohen, Milton. (2012). Hemingway's Laboratory: The Paris 'In our Time'. Tuscaloosa: Alabama University Press. ISBN 978-0-8173-5728-3
- Cohen, Milton. (2003). "Who Commissioned The Little Review's 'In Our Time'?". The Hemingway Review. Vol. 23, No. 1.
- Hagemann, E. R. (1983). "'Only Let the Story End as Soon as Possible': Time-and-History in Ernest Hemingway's In Our Time". In Reynolds, Michael. (ed) Critical essays on Ernest Hemingway's In Our Time. Boston: G. K. Hall. ISBN 978-0-8161-8637-2
- Hannum, Howard. (2001). "'Scared sick looking at it': A Reading of Nick Adams in the Published Stories". Twentieth Century Literature. Vol. 47, No. 1.
- Hemingway, Ernest. (1925/1930) In Our Time. (1996 ed). New York: Scribner. ISBN 978-0-684-82276-1
- Hemingway, Ernest. (1981). Ernest Hemingway Selected Letters 1917–1961. In Baker, Carlos. (ed). New York: Charles Scribner's Sons. ISBN 978-0-684-16765-7
- Hlinak, Matt. (2010). "Hemingway's Very Short Experiment: From 'A Very Short Story' to a A Farewell to Arms". The Journal of the Midwest Modern Language Association. Vol. 43, No. 1.
- Leff, Leonard (1999). Hemingway and His Conspirators: Hollywood, Scribner's and the making of American Celebrity Culture. Lanham, MD: Rowman & Littlefield. ISBN 978-0-8476-8545-5
- Mellow, James. (1992) Hemingway: A Life Without Consequences. New York: Houghton Mifflin. ISBN 978-0-395-37777-2
- Meyers, Jeffrey. (1985). Hemingway: A Biography. New York: Macmillan. ISBN 978-0-8223-1067-9
- Moddelmog, Debra. (1988). "The Unifying Consciousness of a Divided Conscience: Nick Adams as Author of 'In Our Time'". American Literature. Vol. 60, No. 4.
- Oliver, Charles. (1999). Ernest Hemingway A to Z: The Essential Reference to the Life and Work. New York: Checkmark Publishing. ISBN 978-0-8160-3467-3.
- Reynolds, Michael (2000). "Ernest Hemingway, 1899–1961: A Brief Biography". In Wagner-Martin, Linda. (ed). A Historical Guide to Ernest Hemingway. New York: Oxford University Press. ISBN 978-0-19-512152-0
- Reynolds, Michael. (1995). Hemingway's 'In Our Time': The biography of a Book. In Kennedy, Gerald J. (ed). Modern American Short Story Sequences. Cambridge: Cambridge University Press. ISBN 978-0-521-43010-4
- Reynolds, Michael. (1989). Hemingway: The Paris Years. New York: Norton. ISBN 978-0-393-31879-1
- Smith, Paul. (1996). "1924: Hemingway's Luggage and the Miraculous Year". In Donaldson, Scott (ed). The Cambridge Companion to Ernest Hemingway. New York: Cambridge University Press. ISBN 978-0-521-45479-7
- Smith, Paul. (1983). "Hemingway's Early Manuscripts: The Theory and Practice of Omission". Journal of Modern Literature. Vol. 10, No. 2.
- Strychacz, Thomas. (1996). ''In Our Time, Out of Season". In Donaldson, Scott (ed). The Cambridge Companion to Ernest Hemingway. New York: Cambridge University Press. ISBN 978-0-521-45479-7
- Tetlow, Wendolyn E. (1992). Hemingway's "In Our Time": Lyrical Dimensions. Cranbury NJ: Associated University Presses. ISBN 978-0-8387-5219-7
- Wagner-Martin, Linda. (2002). "Introduction". In Wagner-Martin, Linda (ed). Ernest Hemingway's The Sun Also Rises: A Casebook. New York: Oxford University Press. ISBN 978-0-19-514573-1
- Wagner-Martin, Linda. (1983). "Juxtaposition in Hemingway's In Our Time". In Reynolds, Michael. (ed). Critical essays on Ernest Hemingway's In Our Time. Boston: G. K. Hall. ISBN 978-0-8161-8637-2
- Waldhorn, Arthur. (2002 edition). A reader's guide to Ernest Hemingway. Syracuse, NY: Syracuse University Press. ISBN 978-0-8156-2950-4
- Young, Philip. 1952. "Adventures of Nick Adams," from Chapter 1 of Ernest Hemingway (1952), Holt, Rinehart and Winston publishers in Hemingway: A Collection of Critical Essays, 1962, pp. 95-111, Robert P. Weeks, editor. Prentice Hall, New Jersey. Library of Congress Catalog Card no. 62–13652.
