= Cross Country Snow =

1924 short story by Ernest Hemingway

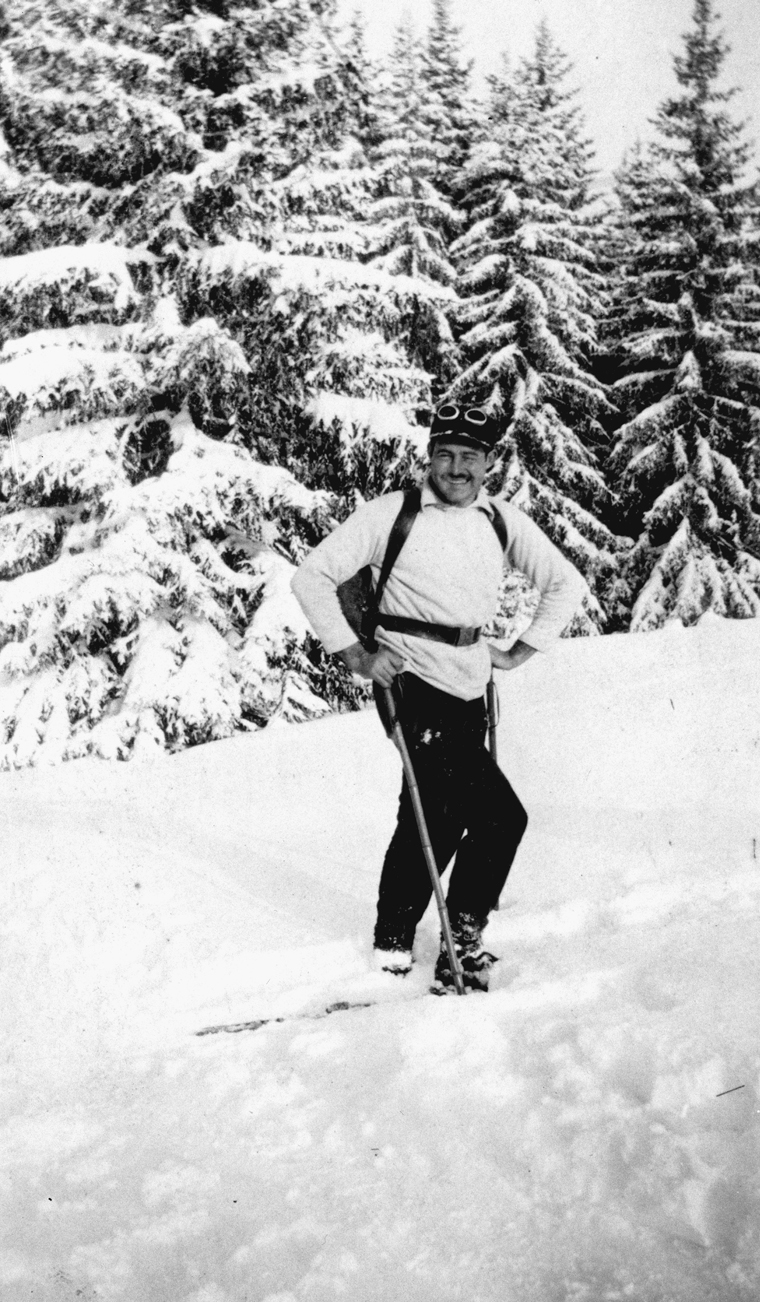
Hemingway skiing in Schruns, Austria, 1927

"Cross Country Snow" is a short story written by Ernest Hemingway. The story was first published in 1924 in Ford Madox Ford's literary magazine Transatlantic Review in Paris and republished by Boni & Liveright in Hemingway's first American volume of short stories In Our Time in 1925. The story features Hemingway's recurrent autobiographical character Nick Adams and explores the regenerative powers of nature and the joy of skiing.

== Background ==
In 1922 Ernest Hemingway and his wife Hadley came to Paris where he worked as foreign correspondent for the Toronto Star. During that period he made friends with modernist writers such as F. Scott Fitzgerald, Ford Madox Ford, James Joyce, Ezra Pound and Gertrude Stein, who influenced his early development as a fiction writer. The year 1923 saw his first published work, a slim volume titled Three Stories and Ten Poems, followed the next year by a collection of short vignettes, in our time (without capitals). Hoping to have in our time published in New York, in 1924 he began writing stories to add to the volume. On October 5, 1925, the expanded edition of In Our Time (with conventional capitalization in the title) was published by Boni & Liveright in New York.

In those years the Hemingways were avid skiers after their first trip to Switzerland in 1922. Hadley wrote "skiing became a must", adding, "It is the kind of thing that it seems one will never learn, and then all of a sudden you can do it". In the early 1920s they stayed in Montreux and skied at Les Avants; by the mid- 1920s they spent most of the winter months in Austria, at Schruns. Hemingway wrote "Cross Country Snow" in 1924 after wintering for the first time in Cortina d'Ampezzo with Hadley and their infant son Jack.

Hemingway took skiing lessons from the partner of Austrian skiing instructor Hannes Schneider, where friends such as John Dos Passos joined him. Without ski lifts, skiers made the steep climb to high snow fields, a challenge Hemingway enjoyed, followed by the exhilaration of skiing down. In the spring months they were able to ski as many as 40 miles a day on the glaciers. For the first time he grew a beard during the winter months to protect his skin from sun and snow.

== Plot summary ==
In "Cross Country Snow," Nick Adams and his friend George have gone skiing in Switzerland. The story begins with Nick riding up the mountain on a funicular car while watching George ski down the mountain. Nick then arrives at the top of the mountain and begins skiing down. He loses control and crashes into a pile of soft snow. He and George continue down the mountain, stopping several times to comment on the terrain. When they arrive at the base of the run, they walk to an inn for a drink.

When they arrive at the inn, they order a bottle of wine and notice that their waitress is pregnant although she does not appear to be married. Nick and George then discuss their lives: how Nick’s wife is pregnant so they will be returning to the United States and how George must finish his education. They regret that they will have to give up their ski trips and discuss that perhaps they will return to ski once again sometime in the future. Finally, they leave the inn for a final run home together.

== Themes and style ==
According to Hemingway scholar Wendolyn Tetlow the short stories in In Our Time are structured to form a thematic unity. The volume's early stories are about senseless death and the "ultimate nothingness of existence", whereas the second half of the collection focuses on how to cope with pain, wounding and suffering, and how to accept life. Cross Country Snow is about escape and yet the need to accept life's burdens.

The story's tension lies in the need opposition of freedom and duty, with the opening conveying a sense of freedom as Nick Adams skis down the mountain. Joseph Flora says Hemingway juxtaposes pleasure and responsibility. Both young men, Nick and George face duties after this day of skiing; George must return to school and Nick's wife is pregnant.

Hemingway scholar David Ferrero explains that some early stories from In Our Time, including "Cross Country Snow", have received readings from critics positioning Hemingway as a misogynist in a world of men without women. In her article "Doomed Biologically: Sex and Entrapment in Ernest Hemingway’s ‘Cross Country Snow’," Olivia Carr Edenfield writes that by having Nick strap himself into his ski-binding creates and image of a young man bound and strapped into marriage and impending fatherhood.

The rush and sudden swoop as he dropped down a steep undulation in the mountain side plucked Nick's mind out and left him only the wonderful flying, dropping sensation in his body. He rose to a slight up-run and then the snow seemed to drop out from under him as he went down, down, faster and faster in a rush down the last long steep slope.

— Ernest Hemingway, "Cross-Country Snow".

In the inn, while Nick and George are talking, the reader realizes several things about Nick. He is removed from the surroundings as if he were already a tourist visiting a foreign land. The Swiss locals in the bar are contrasted with the "boys" as they enter; and in counterpoint to Nick, the waitress is pregnant but unmarried. Although they want to ski again together the two young men know they might not; each has a responsibility and as Kenneth Johnston says "the best of friends often lose track of one another". The last piece of dialogue shifts from gloominess to hopefulness to defeat, according to Tetlow, ending with Nick's declaration there is no "good in promising".

Hemingway used pervasive snow imagery in many short stories and in A Farewell to Arms, usually symbolizing love and romance.

The story's lyricism and "subtle nuances" are the strongest of the stories in the collection. Its structure is similar to "The Three-Day Blow", which Hemingway would use again in the fishing scenes of The Sun Also Rises. It begins with frequent use of soft sounds, "snow", "solidly", "surface", "skis", which reflect the movements of skiing. Tetlow says the "sensuous language renders the sensation of flight". The snow is equally visual and tactile. The language captures the rhythm of skiing, with up-and-down movements, the swoop of the slope, yet Nick tries to restrain himself from gathering too much speed, from losing control, and yet, not completely in control, he crashes.

== Sources ==
- Baker, Carlos (1981). Ernest Hemingway Selected Letters 1917–1961. New York: Charles Scribner's Sons. ISBN 978-0-684-16765-7
- Edenfield, Olivia Carr. "Doomed Biologically: Sex and entrapment in Ernest Hemingway's 'Cross-Country Snow'". The Hemingway Review. (Fall 1999). Volume 19, Issue 1
- Fishkin, Shelley Fisher. (1985) From Fact to Fiction: Journalism and Imaginative Writing in America. Baltimore, MD: The Johns Hopkins University Press. ISBN 0-8018-2546-6
- Ferrero, David. (2004). "Nikki Adams and the Limits of Gender Criticism", in Nick Adams. (ed. Harold Bloom). Broomall, PA: Chelsea House. ISBN 0-7910-7885-X
- Flora, Joseph (2004). "Soldier Home: Big Two-Hearted River". in Bloom, Harold (ed.). Bloom's Major Literary Characters: Nick Adams. New York: Chelsea House Press. ISBN 978-0-7910-7885-3
- Flora, Joseph. (1989). Ernest Hemingway: A Study of the Short Fiction. Boston: Twayne Publishers, ISBN 9780805783223
- Hemingway, Ernest. (1925/1930) In Our Time. (1996 ed.) New York: Scribner. ISBN 0-684-82276-8
- Johnston, Kenneth. (1987) The Tip of the Iceberg: Hemingway and the Short Story. Greenwood, Florida: The Penkevill Publishing Company. ISBN 9780913283196
- Mellow, James (1992). Hemingway: A Life Without Consequences. New York: Houghton Mifflin. ISBN 978-0-395-37777-2
- Meyers, Jeffrey (1985). Hemingway: A Biography. New York: Macmillan. ISBN 978-0-333-42126-0
- Oldsey, Bern. "The Snows of Ernest Hemingway". Wisconsin Studies in Contemporary Literature. (Spring–Summer 1963). Volume 4, Issue 2.
- Oliver, Charles (1999). Ernest Hemingway A to Z: The Essential Reference to the Life and Work. New York: Checkmark Publishing. ISBN 978-0-8160-3467-3
- Tetlow, Wendolyn E. (1992). Hemingway's "In Our Time": Lyrical Dimensions. Cranbury NJ: Associated University Presses. ISBN 978-0-8387-5219-7
- Vernon, Alex. "War, Gender, and Ernest Hemingway". The Hemingway Review (Fall 2002), Volume 22, Issue 1. 34–55
