= My Old Man (short story) =

Short story by Ernest Hemingway

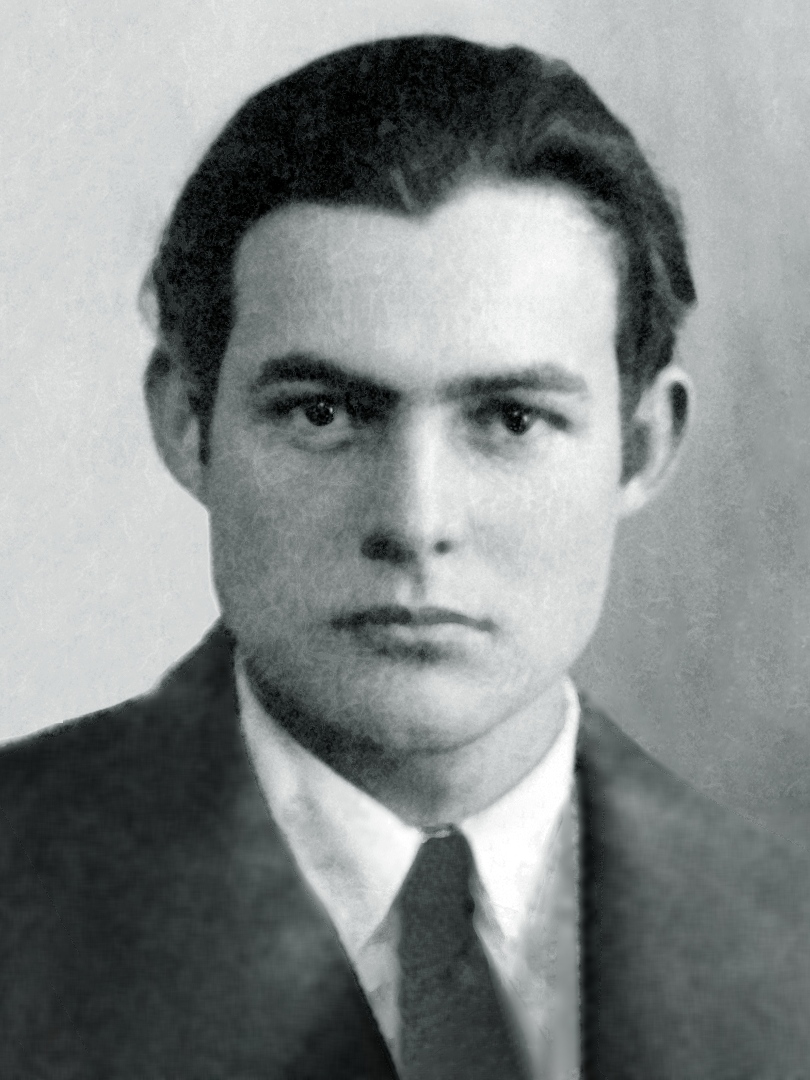
Ernest Hemingway in 1923

"My Old Man" is a short story written by Ernest Hemingway, published in his 1923 book Three Stories and Ten Poems, which published by a small Paris imprint. The story was also included in his next collection of stories, In Our Time, published in New York in 1925 by Boni & Liveright. The story tells of a boy named Joe whose father is a steeplechase jockey, and is narrated from Joe's point-of-view.

"My Old Man" was written in 1922. As one of Hemingway's earliest stories, it is generally regarded by critics as juvenilia, along with "Up in Michigan", also published in Three Stories and Ten Poems. Critical attention focuses chiefly on three issues: Sherwood Anderson's influence, the story's narrative structure, and the question of whether Joe's father is moral or immoral.

The story was the basis for the 1950 film Under My Skin, and the 1979 television film My Old Man.

== Publication history ==
Hemingway and his wife Hadley lived in Paris, where he was foreign correspondent for the Toronto Star from 1922 until Hadley became pregnant in 1923 when they returned to Toronto. During his absence, Bill Bird's Parisian Three Mountains Press published a small collection of Hemingway's work, Three Stories and Ten Poems, which included "My Old Man". During the "great suitcase debacle" of the previous year, when a suitcase containing all of Hemingway's manuscripts was stolen from Hadley at a Paris train station, "My Old Man" was one of two stories to survive because it was in the post to editors.

In 1925 the story was reprinted in the New York edition of In Our Time, published by Boni & Liveright.

== Summary ==
The story opens with Joe living in Italy with his father, Butler, who is a steeplechase jockey, riding in races on tracks in the Milan and Turin area. One day Joe sees two men, one named Holbrook, engage in a tense conversation with his father. After, Butler says to his son, "You got to take a lot things in this world, Joe."

This Kzar is a great big yellow horse …. I never saw such a horse. He was being led around the paddocks with his head down and when he went by me I felt all hollow he was so beautiful. There was never such a wonderful, lean, running built horse.

— "My Old Man"

They pack their belongings and move to Paris, taking rooms at Maisons-Laffitte, where Joe plays in the woods with the local boys. For some reason unknown to him, his father rarely races in France, but he frequents the race tracks with Joe. At one race Joe is captivated by a large horse named Kzar; he cannot imagine any of the other horses winning. Yet Kzar loses by a nose and his father wins a large amount of money, having placed a large bet against the favorite at the recommendation of Kzar's jockey, Gardner.

He buys an Irish thoroughbred named Gilford, trains it, and begins racing again. On his second outing at a race in Auteuil, Gilford fails to make the final jump and falls on top of Butler, killing him. Gardner takes Joe, who is crying, away from the track. As they leave, Joe overhears a man say to another, "Well, Butler got his all right." Gardner says, "Don't you listen to what those bums said, Joe. Your old man was one swell guy." Joe is unconvinced. The story ends with these lines: "But I don't know. Seems like when they get started, they don't leave a guy nothing."

== Themes and style ==
"My Old Man" has received little critical attention, and is more often thought of as one of Hemingway's apprentice story, or as juvenilia. Yet in 1924, only two years later, he would write two of the strongest stories in his canon, "Indian Camp" and "Big Two-Hearted River". Hemingway critic Thomas Strychaz writes that "My Old Man" is generally accepted as the weakest story in In Our Time, yet he says its importance lies in advancing themes of American expatriates in post-World War I Europe, weak or "toppled fathers", social corruption and innocence betrayed.

Hemingway critic Wendolyn Tetlow writes "My Old Man" is an initiation story, similar to "Indian Camp" where a young boy's innocence is stripped away, and that it is told from the child's point-of-view in a first person narrative. Despite the childlike tone of the narrative, which often displays sentimentality or nostalgia for the boy's father, Joe is fully aware of the intent of the comment he overhears. He understands bitterly that his father's reputation is damaged, stating "when they get started, they don't leave a guy nothing".

Tetlow says Joe learns that his father, a man who refused to fix races, is killed because he was being true to himself. Not all critics agree and readings of the story vary. Butler is perceived variously as crooked and deeply corrupt, morally bereft, to "not a son of a bitch" or "benevolently honorable". The owners, jockeys and bettors in the horse racing world are seen as corrupt, but Hemingway does not reveal explicitly whether Butler is at odds with others because he is moral, or at odds because he is throwing races. It could be that the fact that Gilford is owned by Butler makes all the difference. As owner, Butler does not have to take orders as to whether to win or lose. This is why buying the horse seemed to give him a new lease of life. He was prepared to win money on a corrupt bet in order to have enough money to buy his own horse and so redeem himself. But fate decided otherwise. Phillip Sipiora writes that the narrative mode, which filters the reader's view through the eyes of a 12-year-old child, shapes the confusion about Butler's honor.

The narrative's time frame is equally confusing. It is not clear whether Joe tells the story as a 12-year-old whose father has just died, or whether he is telling the story as an adult. It is a complex narrative style, presenting multiple temporal perspectives and a subjective perception of reality, which make it difficult for the reader to know the truth.

== Reception ==
Since its publication "My Old Man" has continued to be anthologized, often because of the unusual narrative structure, according to Sipiora. In Our Time received good reviews; Edmund Wilson described the writing as "of the first distinction"; and biographer James Mellow writes the volume is a Hemingway masterpiece.

== Sources ==
- Baker, Carlos (1972). Hemingway: The Writer as Artist. Princeton: Princeton UP. ISBN 978-0-691-01305-3
- Oliver, Charles. (1999). Ernest Hemingway A to Z: The Essential Reference to the Life and Work. New York: Checkmark Publishing. ISBN 978-0-8160-3467-3
- Mellow, James. (1992) Hemingway: A Life Without Consequences. New York: Houghton Mifflin. ISBN 978-0-3953-7777-2
- Sipiora, Phillip. (1992) "Ethical Narration in 'My Old Man'". in Beegel, Susan, Hemingway's Neglected Short Fiction. Tuscaloosa: Alabama UP. ISBN 978-0-8173-0586-4
- Smith, Paul. (1996). "1924: Hemingway's Luggage and the Miraculous Year". in Donaldson, Scott (ed). The Cambridge Companion to Ernest Hemingway. New York: Cambridge UP. ISBN 978-0-521-45479-7
- Strychacz, Thomas. (1996). "'In Our Time', Out of Season". in Donaldson, Scott (ed). The Cambridge Companion to Ernest Hemingway. New York: Cambridge UP. ISBN 978-0-521-45479-7
- Tetlow, Wendolyn E. (1992). Hemingway's "In Our Time": Lyrical Dimensions. Cranbury NJ: Associated University Presses. ISBN 978-0-8387-5219-7
