= Cat in the Rain =

Short story by Ernest Hemingway

- Short story by Ernest Hemingway
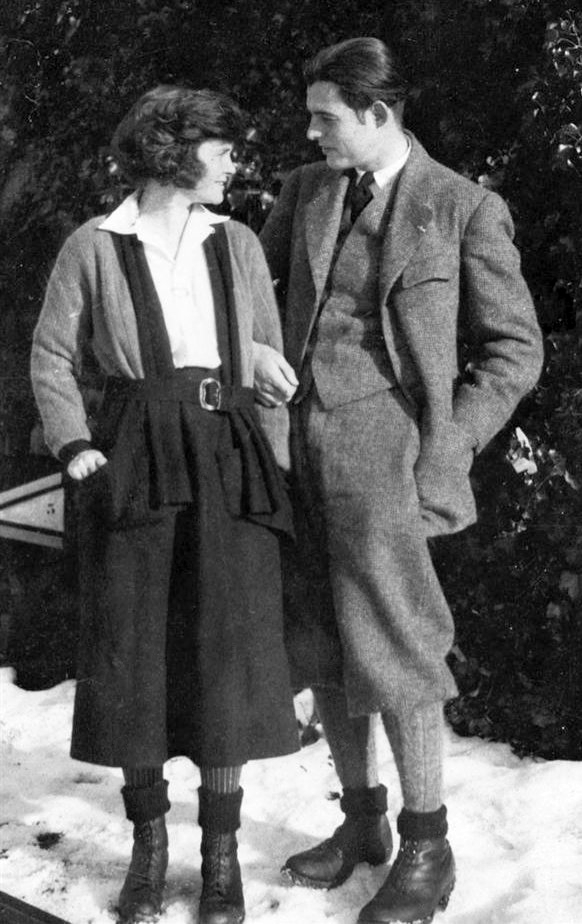
- Ernest Hemingway, with Hadley Richardson

Publication
- Published in: In Our Time
- Publisher: Boni & Liveright
- Publication date: 1925

"Cat in the Rain" is a short story by American author Ernest Hemingway (1899-1961), first published by Boni & Liveright in 1925 in the short story collection In Our Time. The story is about an American husband and wife on vacation in Italy. Critical attention focuses chiefly on its autobiographical elements and on Hemingway's "theory of omission" (iceberg theory).

== Background ==
According to the book Hemingway's Cats, Hemingway wrote the story as a tribute to his wife Hadley. The couple had only been married a few years and lived in Paris, where she was often left alone for hours at a time while her husband worked. She asked for a cat, but he told her they were too poor. When she became pregnant, he wrote "Cat in the Rain," apparently based on an incident in Rapallo (where they visited Ezra Pound in 1923). Hadley found a stray kitten and said, "I want a cat ... I want a cat. I want a cat now. If I can’t have long hair or any fun, I can have a cat.”

== Plot summary ==
"Cat in the Rain" is a short story about an American couple on vacation in Italy, set in and around the couple's hotel, which faces the sea as well as the "public garden and the war monument." Throughout the story, it rains, leaving the couple trapped in their hotel room. As the American wife watches the rain, she sees a cat crouched “under one of the dripping green tables.” Feeling sorry for the cat that “was trying to make herself so Compact she would not be dripped on,” the wife decides to rescue "that kitty."

On her way downstairs, the American wife encounters the innkeeper, with whom she has a short conversation. In this encounter, Hemingway specifically emphasizes how the wife "likes" the innkeeper, a word that is repeated often throughout the stories in In Our Time: "The wife liked him. She liked the deadly serious way he received any complaints. She liked his dignity. She liked the way he wanted to serve her. She liked the way he felt about being a hotel-keeper. She liked his old, heavy face and big hands."

When the American wife finally arrives outside, the cat is gone, and, slightly crestfallen, she returns to the room alone. The American wife then has a (rather one-sided) conversation with her husband about the things she wants in her life, particularly how she wants to settle down (as opposed to the transient vacation life the couple leads in the story): “I want to eat at a table with my own silver and I want candles. And I want it to be spring and I want to brush my hair out in front of a mirror and I want a kitty and I want some new clothes.” However, her husband, George, continues to read his book, acting dismissively of what his wife “wants.” The story ends when the maid arrives with a “big tortoise-shell cat pressed tight against her and swung down against her body,” which she gives to the American wife.

== Writing style ==
Hemingway biographer Carlos Baker writes that Hemingway learned from his short stories how to "get the most from the least, how to prune language, how to multiply intensities, and how to tell nothing but the truth in a way that allowed for telling more than the truth". This style, known as the iceberg theory or the "theory of omission," involves presenting only the surface details while leaving the underlying meaning and structure implicit. Hemingway explained this concept in Death in the Afternoon: "If a writer of prose knows enough about what he is writing about he may omit things that he knows and the reader, if the writer is writing truly enough, will have a feeling of those things as strongly as though the writer had stated them. The dignity of movement of an iceberg is due to only one-eighth of it being above water."

Hemingway learned to achieve this stripped-down style from Ezra Pound, who, according to Hemingway, "had taught him more 'about how to write and how not to write' than any son of a bitch alive". He was also influenced by James Joyce, who taught him to "pare down his work to the essentials".

The iceberg theory is evident in "Cat in the Rain," where Hemingway goes beyond mere reporting and tries to convey a sense of reality. The idea that there is "something below the surface" is particularly evident in relation to the cat. The cat is not just a cat; as Professor of English Shigeo Kikuchi writes, the animal's nature is shrouded in mystery: "The moderately distant location of the room and the two words suggestive of the cat’s size, have the effect of concealing from the reader the cat’s true size and sort [which makes] it impossible to identify the 'cat in the rain'." Scholars have suggested that the cat represents a physical manifestation of the wife's desire for a child: "The cat stands for her need of a child".

The ending of "Cat in the Rain" is both abrupt and ambiguous, hinging on the mystery of the tortoiseshell cat's identity. "We do not know whether it is the 'kitty' the wife spotted outside and so do not know whether she will be pleased to get it."

A New York Times book reviewer comments on the plot of the very short story, writing "that is absolutely all there is, yet a lifetime of discontent, of looking outside for some unknown fulfillment is compressed into the offhand recital."

== Reception ==
"Cat in the Rain" was first published in New York in 1925, as part of the short story collection In Our Time. The title of the collection is derived from the Anglican Book of Common Prayer ("Give us peace in our time, O Lord"). It includes notable short stories such as "Indian Camp" and "Big Two-Hearted River".

In Our Time received acclaim upon its publication from notable authors of the period, including Ford Madox Ford, John Dos Passos, and F. Scott Fitzgerald for its simple and precise use of language to convey a wide range of complex emotions. It earned Hemingway a place beside Sherwood Anderson and Gertrude Stein among the most promising American writers of that period.

In a New York Times book review from October 1925, titled Preludes to a Mood, the reviewer praised Hemingway for his use of language, describing it as "fibrous and athletic, colloquial and fresh, hard and clean; his very prose seems to have an organic being of its own. Every syllable counts toward a stimulating, entrancing experience of magic."

Author D.H. Lawrence commented that In Our Time was "a series of successive sketches from a man's life...a fragmentary novel...It is a short book: and it does not pretend to be about one man. But it is. It is as much as we need to know of the man's life. The sketches are short, sharp, vivid, and most of them excellent."

Hemingway's biographer, James R. Mellow, noted that Hemingway's writing in In Our Time illustrated his appreciation of Gertrude Stein's Three Lives and acknowledged its influence on his work.

== In the media ==
"Cat in the Rain" inspired a short film titled Cat in the Rain, directed by Matthew Gentile and Ben Hanks. Released in 2011, the film stars Brian Caspe, Veronika Bellová, and Curtis Matthew.
