= Indian Camp =

Short story by Ernest Hemingway

- Short story by Ernest Hemingway
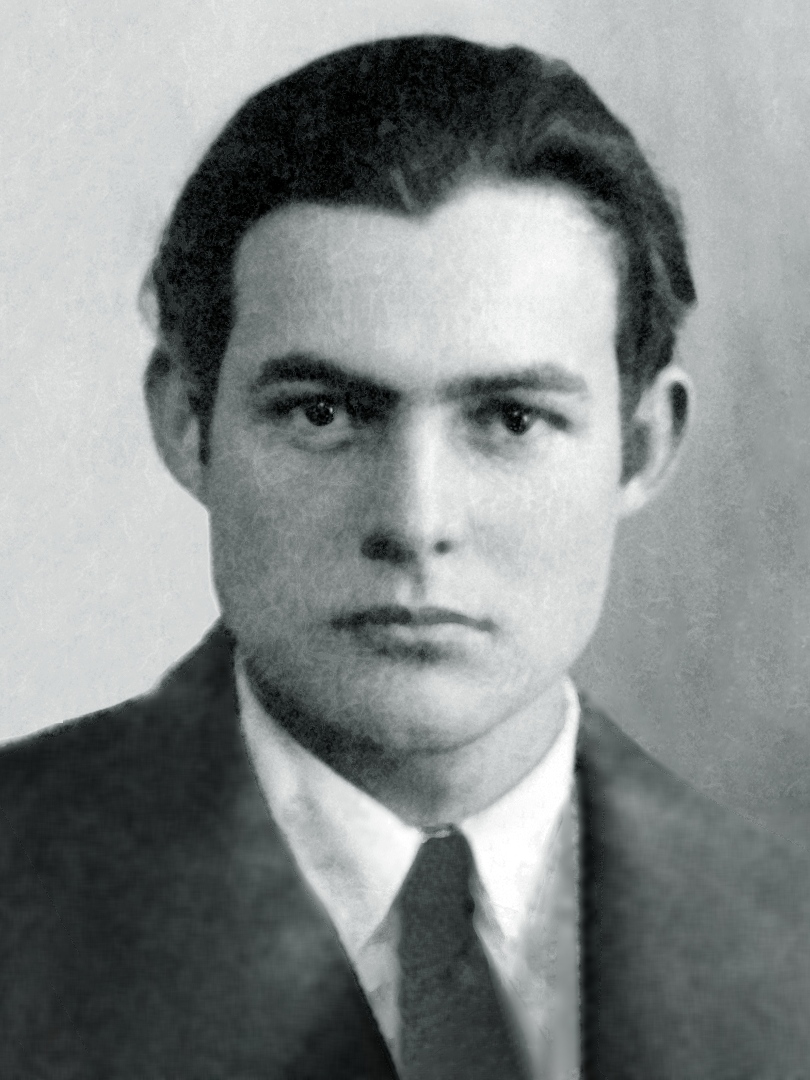
- Ernest Hemingway's 1923 passport photo taken a year before the publication of "Indian Camp"

Text available at Wikisource
- Country: United States
- Language: English

Publication
- Published in: The Transatlantic Review
- Publication type: Magazine
- Publisher: Gerald Duckworth and Company
- Publication date: 1924

"Indian Camp" is a short story written by Ernest Hemingway. The story was first published in 1924 in Ford Madox Ford's literary magazine The Transatlantic Review in Paris and republished by Boni & Liveright in Hemingway's first American volume of short stories In Our Time in 1925. Hemingway's semi-autobiographical character Nick Adams—a child in this story—makes his first appearance in "Indian Camp", told from his point of view.

In the story Nick Adams' father, a country doctor, has been summoned to a Native American or "Indian" camp to deliver a baby. At the camp, the father is forced to perform an emergency caesarean section using a jack-knife, with Nick as his assistant. Afterward, the woman's husband is discovered dead, having slit his throat during the operation. The story shows the emergence of Hemingway's understated style and his use of counterpoint. An initiation story, "Indian Camp" includes themes such as childbirth and fear of death which permeate much of Hemingway's subsequent work. When the story was published, the quality of writing was noted and praised, and scholars consider "Indian Camp" an important story in the Hemingway canon.

== Plot summary ==
The story begins in the pre-dawn hours as the young Nick Adams, his father, his uncle and their Indian guides row across a lake to a nearby Indian camp. Nick's father, a doctor, has been called out to deliver a baby for a woman who has been in labor for days. At the camp, they find the woman in a cabin lying on a bottom bunkbed; her husband lies above her with an injured foot. Nick's father is forced to perform a caesarian operation on the woman with a jack-knife because the baby is breeched; he asks Nick to assist by holding a basin. The woman screams throughout the operation, and when Nick's uncle tries to hold her down, she bites him.

After the baby is delivered, Nick's father turns to the woman's husband on the top bunk and finds that the husband fatally slit his own throat with a straight razor from ear to ear during the operation. Nick is sent out of the cabin, and his uncle leaves with two Natives, not to return. The story ends with only Nick and his father on the lake, rowing away from the camp. Nick asks his father questions about birth and death, and thinks to himself that he will never die, as he watches his father row.

== Background and publication history ==
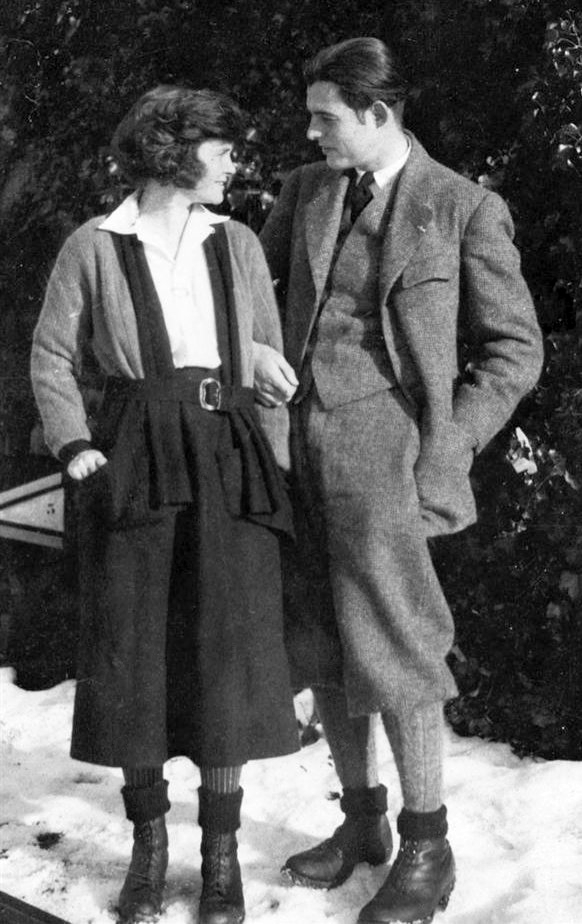
Ernest Hemingway and his first wife Hadley in Chamby, (Montreux), a year before their son John was born.

In the early 1920s, Hemingway and his wife Hadley lived in Paris where he was foreign correspondent for the Toronto Star. When Hadley became pregnant they returned to Toronto. Hemingway biographer Kenneth Lynn suggests that Hadley's childbirth became the inspiration for the story. She went into labor while Hemingway was on a train, returning from New York. Lynn believes Hemingway likely was terrified Hadley would not survive the birth, and he became "beside himself with fear ... about the extent of her suffering and swamped by a sense of helplessness at the realization that he would probably arrive too late to be of assistance to her." Hemingway wrote "Indian Camp" a few months after John Hemingway was born in Toronto on October 10, 1923.

While they were in Toronto, Hemingway's first book, Three Stories and Ten Poems, was published in Paris, followed months later by a second volume, in our time (without capitals), which included 18 short vignettes presented as untitled chapters. Hemingway, Hadley, and their son (nicknamed Bumby) returned to Paris in January 1924, moving into a new apartment on the Rue Notre Dame des Champs. With Ezra Pound, Hemingway helped Ford Madox Ford edit his newly launched literary magazine, Transatlantic Review. which published pieces by modernists such as Pound, John Dos Passos, James Joyce, Gertrude Stein, as well as Hemingway.

"Indian Camp" began as a 29-page untitled manuscript that Hemingway cut to seven pages; at first he called the story "One Night Last Summer". In 1924, the seven-page story titled "Indian Camp" was published by the Transatlantic Review in the "Works in Progress" section, along with a piece from James Joyce's manuscript Finnegans Wake. A year later on October 5, 1925, "Indian Camp" was republished by Boni & Liveright in New York, in an expanded American edition of Hemingway's first collection of short stories titled In Our Time, (with capitals) with a print-run of 1335 copies.

"Indian Camp" was later included in Hemingway's collection The Fifth Column and the First Forty-Nine Stories published in October 1938. Two collections of short stories published after Hemingway's death included "Indian Camp": The Nick Adams Stories (1972) and The Complete Short Stories of Ernest Hemingway: The Finca Vigía Edition (1987). The Nick Adams Stories (1972), edited by Philip Young, included the story fragment titled "Three Shots" that Hemingway originally cut from "Indian Camp."

== Themes and genre ==
=== Initiation and fear of death ===
"Indian Camp" is an initiation story. Nick's father (Dr. Adams) exposes his young son to childbirth and, unintentionally, to violent death—an experience that causes Nick to equate childbirth with death. Hemingway critic Wendolyn Tetlow maintains that in "Indian Camp," sexuality culminates in "butchery-style" birth and bloody death, and that Nick's anxiety is obvious when he turns away from the butchery. The story reaches a climax when Nick's "heightened awareness" of evil causes him to turn away from the experience. Although Nick may not want to watch the caesarian, his father insists he watch - he does not want his son to be initiated into an adult world without toughness, writes Thomas Strychacz.

Inside on a wooden bunk lay a young Indian woman. She had been trying to have her baby for two days ... She screamed just as Nick and the two Indians followed his father and Uncle George into the shanty . ... In the upper bunk was her husband. He had cut his foot very badly with an axe three days before . ... The room smelled very bad.

— "Indian Camp"

Hemingway biographer Philip Young writes that Hemingway's emphasis in "Indian Camp" was not primarily on the woman who gives birth or the father who kills himself, but on young Nick Adams, who witnesses these events and becomes a "badly scarred and nervous young man". In "Indian Camp," Hemingway begins the events that shape the Adams persona. Young considers this single Hemingway story to hold the "master key" to "what its author was up to for some thirty-five years of his writing career". Critic Howard Hannum agrees. He believes the trauma of birth and suicide Hemingway paints in "Indian Camp" rendered a leitmotif that gave Hemingway a unified framework for the Nick Adams stories.

"Indian Camp" is also about the fear of death. The section cut from the story highlights Nick's fear; the published version underscores it in a less obvious manner. In the cut section, later published as "Three Shots," the night before being taken to the Indian camp Nick is left alone in the forest, where he is "overwhelmed by thoughts of death." Critic Paul Strong speculates that Hemingway may have intended the narrative to be structured so that Nick's father chose to take his fearful son to the Indian camp where Nick faced the grisly reality of death, which can have done "little to assuage Nick's fears." Hannum believes Hemingway is intentionally vague about the details of the birth but not the death; he speculates that Nick would have likely "blocked out much of the caesarian but he had clearly seen the father's head tilted back."

Critics have questioned why the woman's husband kills himself. Strong finds the arguments that the husband is driven to suicide by the wife's screaming to be problematic because the suicide occurs at the moment the screams are silenced. He points to Hemingway's statement in Death in the Afternoon, "if two people love each other there can be no happy end to it," as evidence that the husband may have killed himself because he is "driven frantic by his wife's pain, and perhaps his own."

The story also shows the innocence of childhood; Nick Adams believes he will live forever and be a child forever; he is a character who sees his life "stretching ahead." At the end of the story, in the boat with his father, Nick denies death when he says he will never die. "Indian Camp" shows Hemingway's early fascination with suicide and with the conflict between fathers and sons. Young thinks there is an unavoidable focus on the fact that the two people the principal characters are based on—the father, Clarence Hemingway, and the boy, Ernest Hemingway—end up committing suicide. Kenneth Lynn writes that the irony to modern readers is that both characters in "that boat on the lake would one day do away with themselves." Hemingway shot himself on July 2, 1961; his father had shot himself on December 6, 1928.

=== Primitivism, race, and autobiography ===
In his essay "Hemingway's Primitivism and 'Indian camp '" Jeffrey Meyers writes that Hemingway was very clear about the husband's role, because in this story he was writing about a familiar subject—the experiences of his boyhood in Michigan. The young father's role is to "deflate the doctor," who finds victory in slicing open the woman's belly to deliver the infant, and to provide a counterpoint to the mother's strength and resilience. The father's suicide serves as a symbolic rejection of the white doctor whose skill is necessary, but who brings with him destruction. In her paper "Screaming Through Silence: The Violence of Race in 'Indian Camp,'" Amy Strong writes "Indian Camp" is about domination; the husband kills himself at the moment his wife is cut open by a white doctor. She thinks the theme of domination exists on more than one level: Nick is dominated by his father; the white outsiders dominate in the Indian camp; and the white doctor "has cut into the woman, like the early settlers leaving a gash in the tree."

According to Hemingway scholar Thomas Strychacz, in the story Hemingway presents a re-enactment of the arrival of Europeans in the New World and the subsequent doctrine of manifest destiny. The white men in the story arrive on the water and are met at a beach by natives. The native husband and father of the baby loses everything, causing him to kill himself: his home is overtaken, and his wife ripped apart. The white doctor tells his son to ignore the woman's screams: "her screams are not important. I don't hear them because they are not important." The doctor's victory is to control nature by delivering a baby, diminished by the father's suicide who through his death symbolically takes back control from the white doctor.

Meyers claims the story is not autobiographical though it is an early example of Hemingway's ability to tell stories "true to life." In the story, Nick Adams' father, who is portrayed as "professionally cool," is based on Hemingway's own father, Clarence Hemingway. Hemingway's paternal uncle, George, appears in the story, and is treated unsympathetically. Hannum suggests George may have been the child's father, writing that in the story remains the "never-resolved implication of the paternity of the Indian child." During the surgery the mother bites Uncle George, the Indians laugh at him, and he leaves when the father is found dead.

Jackson Benson writes in "Ernest Hemingway: The Life as Fiction and the Fiction as Life" that critics should refrain from finding connections between Hemingway's life and fiction and instead focus on how he uses biographical events to transform life into art. He believes the events in a writer's life have only a vague relationship to the fiction, like a dream from which a drama emerges. Of Hemingway's earliest stories, Benson claims "his early fiction, his best, has often been compared to a compulsive nightmare." In his essay "On Writing," Hemingway wrote that "Indian Camp" was a story in which imaginary events were made to seem real: "Everything good he'd ever written he'd made up . ... Of course he'd never seen an Indian woman having a baby. That was what made it good."

== Writing style ==
Ezra Pound photographed by E.O. Hoppé in 1920, two years before he taught Hemingway to write in the imagist style.

Hemingway biographer Carlos Baker writes that Hemingway learned from his short stories how to "get the most from the least, how to prune language, how to multiply intensities, and how to tell nothing but the truth in a way that allowed for telling more than the truth." The style has is considered exemplary of the iceberg theory, because, as Baker describes it, in Hemingway's writing the hard facts float above water while the supporting structure, including the symbolism, operates out of sight. Benson believes Hemingway used autobiographical details as framing devices to write about life in general—not only his life. The concept of the iceberg theory is sometimes referred to as the "theory of omission." Hemingway believed the writer could describe one thing though an entirely different thing occurs below the surface.

Hemingway learned from Ezra Pound how to achieve a stripped-down style and how to incorporate the concepts of imagism in his prose. He said Pound "had taught him more 'about how to write and how not to write' than any son of a bitch alive"; and his friend James Joyce told him "to pare down his work to the essentials." The prose is spare and lacks a clear symbolism. Instead of more conventional literary allusions, Hemingway relied on repetitive metaphors or metonymy to build images. The caesarian is repeatedly associated with words such as "the blanket" and "the bunk" in a series of objective correlatives, a technique Hemingway learned from T.S. Eliot. Tetlow believes in this early story Hemingway ignored character development; he simply places a character in a setting, and adds descriptive detail such as a screaming woman, men smoking tobacco, and an infected wound, which give a sense of truth.

"Indian Camp" is constructed in three parts: the first places Nick and his father on a dark lake; the second takes place in the squalid and cramped cabin amid terrifying action; and the third shows Nick and his father back on the lake—bathed in sunlight. Hemingway's use of counterpoint is evident when, for example, at the end, Nick trails his hand in lake water that "felt warm in the sharp chill of the morning." Paul Strong believes the deleted section may have provided context and additional counterpoint to the plot, with Nick's aloneness in the "stillness of the night" juxtaposed against the middle scene, crowded with people. Paul Smith writes that by cutting the piece, Hemingway focuses on the story's central point: the life and death initiation rituals, familiar to the residents of the Indian camp but alien to young Nick. Unable to express his feelings fully, in the end, Nick trails his hand in the water and "felt quite sure that he would never die."

== Reception and legacy ==
Hemingway's writing style attracted attention when in our time (without capitals) was published in Paris in 1924—in a small-print run from Ezra Pound's modernist series through Three Mountains Press. Edmund Wilson described the writing as "of the first distinction," enough to bring attention to Hemingway. When "Indian Camp" was published, it received considerable praise. Ford Madox Ford regarded "Indian Camp" as an important early story by a young writer. Critics in the United States claimed Hemingway reinvigorated the short story by his use of declarative sentences and his crisp style. Hemingway said In Our Time had "pretty good unity" and generally critics agree.

In the 1970s Carlos Baker wrote of the stories from In Our Time, and specifically "Indian Camp," that they were a remarkable achievement. Hemingway scholars, such as Benson, rank "Indian Camp" as one of Hemingway's "greatest short stories," a story that is described as "best known," "violent" and "dramatic." In 1992, Frederick Busch wrote in The New York Times that Hemingway had gone out of fashion. While his antisemitism, racism, violence, and attitudes toward women and homosexuals made him objectionable by current standards, he turned violence into art unlike any other American writer of his time by showing that "the making of art is a matter of life or death, no less." Busch believes Hemingway's characters either faced life or chose death, a choice shown most starkly in "Indian Camp." The saving of a life in "Indian Camp" is at the center of much of Hemingway's fiction, Busch writes, and adds power to his fiction.

== Notes ==
=== Sources ===
- Baker, Carlos (1972). Hemingway: The Writer as Artist (4th ed.). Princeton: Princeton UP. ISBN 0-691-01305-5.
- Benson, Jackson (1989). "Ernest Hemingway: The Life as Fiction and the Fiction as Life". American Literature. 61 (3): 345–358. doi:10.2307/2926824. JSTOR 2926824.
- Hannum, Howard (2001). "'Scared sick looking at it': A Reading of Nick Adams in the Published Stories". Twentieth Century Literature. 47 (1): 92–113. doi:10.2307/827858. JSTOR 827858.
- Hemingway, Ernest (1925). In Our Time. New York: Scribner. ISBN 0-684-82276-8.
- Lynn, Kenneth (1987). Hemingway. Cambridge: Harvard UP. ISBN 0-674-38732-5.
- Mellow, James R. (1992). Hemingway: A Life Without Consequences. New York: Houghton Mifflin. ISBN 0-395-37777-3.
- Meyers, Jeffrey (1985). Hemingway: A Biography. London: Macmillan. ISBN 0-333-42126-4.
- Meyers, Jeffrey (1990). "Hemingway's Primitivism and "Indian Camp"". In Benson, Jackson (ed.). New Critical Approaches to the Short Stories of Ernest Hemingway. Durham, NC: Duke UP. ISBN 0-8223-1067-8.
- Oliver, Charles M. (1999). Ernest Hemingway A to Z: The Essential Reference to the Life and Work. New York: Checkmark. ISBN 0-8160-3467-2.
- Reynolds, Michael (1989). Ernest Hemingway: The Paris Years. New York: Norton. ISBN 0-393-31879-6.
- Smith, Paul (1996). "1924: Hemingway's Luggage and the Miraculous Year". In Scott, Donaldson (ed.). The Cambridge Companion to Ernest Hemingway. New York: Cambridge UP. ISBN 0-521-45574-X.
- Strong, Amy (1996). "Screaming Through Silence: The Violence of Race in Indian Camp and The Doctor's Wife". The Hemingway Review. 16 (1): 19–29.
- Strong, Paul (1991). "The First Nick Adams Stories". Studies in Short Fiction. 28 (1): 83–91.
- Strychacz, Thomas (2003). Hemingway's Theaters of Masculinity. Baton Rouge: Louisiana State UP. ISBN 0-8071-2906-2.
- Tetlow, Wendolyn (1992). Hemingway's In Our Time: Lyrical Dimensions. Cranbury, NJ: Bucknell UP. ISBN 0-8387-5219-5.
- Wagner-Martin, Linda (2002). "Introduction". In Wagner-Martin, Linda (ed.). Ernest Hemingway's The Sun Also Rises: A Casebook. New York: Oxford UP. ISBN 0-19-514573-9.
- Young, Philip (1964). Ernest Hemingway (1973 ed.). St. Paul: Minnesota UP. ISBN 0-8166-0191-7.
