= Chamberlin Inn =

Historic site in Cody, Wyoming, US

Coordinates: 44°31′36.09″N 109°3′49.37″W

The Chamberlin Inn is a historic Cody, Wyoming hotel and landmark, known famously as the hotel where Ernest Hemingway stayed and finished his manuscript, Death in the Afternoon. Located at 1032 12th Street in downtown Cody, Wyoming the small boutique hotel is 21 units made up of a series of suites, rooms, cottage and garden studios, as well as the Court House Residence, all within a brick and wrought iron courtyard.

== Description and history ==
In 1900 Agnes (Aggie) Chamberlin made the journey from Kansas to Cody based on a job awarded to her to work for the famous Buffalo Bill Cody at the Cody Enterprise newspaper office. Across the street from the Cody Enterprise office was a sagebrush-covered vacant lot where in 1903, Agnes opened her first boarding house. Over the next 14 years, several buildings were combined to create the Chamberlin Hotel. Agnes held the first Cody Club meetings in the dining room of the Inn. The Cody Club is still in existence in Cody, Wyoming as the Cody Country Chamber of Commerce's weekly meeting event.

Agnes sold the hotel in 1939 and the name was later changed to the Pawnee Hotel by Hattie and George Evans. Then in 1974 the hotel was purchased by JoJean DeHony, and over the next 31 years JoJean successfully operated the hotel, landscaped the adjoining vacant lot, and added baths to most rooms. In October 2005, the hotel again changed ownership and, as a tribute to Agnes Chamberlin, the name was changed back to the Chamberlin Inn. The owners Ev and Susan Diehl, long time Cody residents, began a complete restoration of the hotel and the surrounding properties.

== Notable guests ==
During the 1920s and 30's, the Chamberlin Inn was a very popular place to stay in Cody and included famous people such as Marshall Fields, Larry Larom, Stanley, and Haliburton.

Ernest Hemingway's signature is on one of the Chamberlin Inn's original guest registers and is displayed in Room 18, where the author stayed for several days in 1932. During this time, Ernest Hemingway had completed the manuscript for "Death in the Afternoon" and mailed the manuscript and several short stories to his publishers from his Cody, Wyoming location. Hemingway spent his days fishing the Clark's Fork River and was known to frequent the Irma Bar at night.

== Present ==
The Chamberlin Inn has been featured in many travel magazines and books including Fodors "Choice", National Geographic Traveler Magazine, Top Ten Inns, Frommers, Historic Hotels of the Rockies, Cowboys & Indian Magazine, Moon Guide, Lonely Planet, Insider's Guide, Sunset Magazine and Western Art & Architecture.

== See also ==
- Agnes Chamberlin by Estes Johanson Murray (pamphlet book, no ISBN)
