= Out of Season (short story) =

Short story by Ernest Hemingway

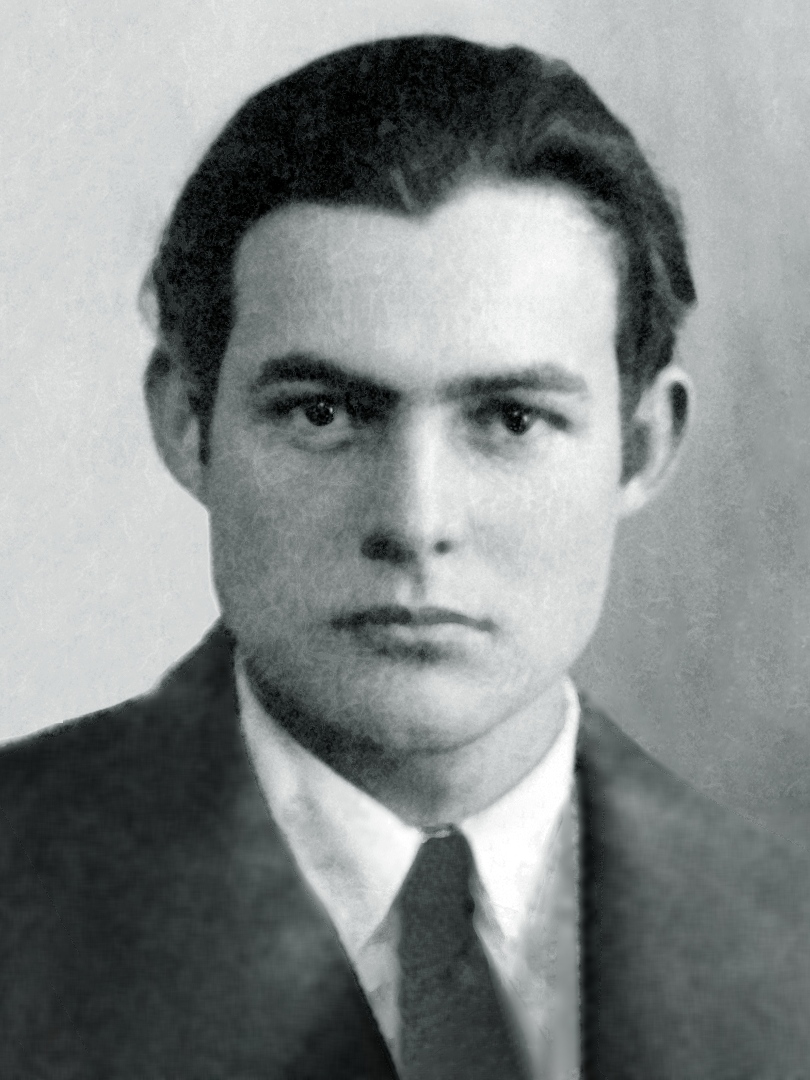
Ernest Hemingway in 1923

"Out of Season" is a short story written by Ernest Hemingway, first published in 1923 in Paris in the privately printed book, Three Stories and Ten Poems. It was included in his next collection of stories, In Our Time, published in New York in 1925 by Boni & Liveright. Set in Cortina d'Ampezzo, Italy, the story is about an expatriate American husband and wife who spend the day fishing, with a local guide. Critical attention focuses chiefly on its autobiographical elements and on Hemingway's claim that it was his first attempt at using the "theory of omission" (iceberg theory).

== Background and publication history ==
In 1922, Hemingway moved to Paris as international correspondent for The Toronto Star. He met Gertrude Stein, F. Scott Fitzgerald and James Joyce, and Ezra Pound, and he was quickly "trading boxing and tennis lessons for Pound's advice on writing". Pound's friendship extended to promoting the young author, placing six of Hemingway's poems in Poetry Magazine.

Six months later the "great suitcase debacle" occurred, when Hemingway's first wife, Elizabeth Hadley Richardson, was traveling to meet Ernest in Lausanne, Hadley's suitcase was stolen at Gare de Lyon train station. All of his manuscripts, including duplicates, were lost. Hemingway was furious but Pound told him he had only lost "the time it will ... take you to rewrite the parts you can remember ... If the middle, i.e., FORM, of the story is right then one ought to be able to reassemble it from memory ... If the thing wobbles and won't reform ... then it never wd. have been right."

Hemingway did not write again until visiting Cortina d'Ampezzo the following spring, when, after a fishing trip he wrote "Out of Season", as he says "right off on the typewriter without punctuation". He cut out the story's ending, which he meant to be tragic, on his theory of omission that "you could omit anything if you knew you omitted [it] and the omitted part would strengthen the story". Expecting the birth of their first child, the Hemingways returned to Toronto in October. During their absence from Paris, Robert McAlmon's Parisian Contact Press published Hemingway's first book, Three Stories and Ten Poems (1923), which contained "Out of Season".

In 1925 the story was reprinted in the New York edition of In Our Time, published by Boni & Liveright. The 18 vignettes of in our time, that had been published by Bill Bird's Three Mountains Press in 1924, were re-ordered and placed between the short stories as interchapters.

== Summary ==
The sun came out. It was warm and pleasant. The young gentleman felt relieved. He was no longer breaking the law. Sitting on the bank, he took the bottle of marsala out of his pocket and passed it to Peduzzi.

— "Out of Season"

The story is about a young American expatriate couple who are staying at a hotel in the village of Cortina d'Ampezzo, in northern Italy. The husband hires the drunk hotel gardener, Peduzzi, to be their guide for a fishing expedition. The couple leave the hotel with Peduzzi, who wants to be paid to buy more liquor. The wife is bad-tempered and not happy that Peduzzi is drunk. The husband buys a quarter of a liter of Marsala, and apologizes to his wife as they walk out of the town. Peduzzi speaks to them in both Italian and Tyrolean German, but they do not understand anything he says.

The wife worries they will be caught, telling her husband, "We're probably being followed by the game police now. I wish we weren't in on this damn thing. This damned fool is so drunk too." He suggests she go back to the hotel but she tells him that if they are caught she will go to jail with him. Peduzzi tells them the fishing area is a thirty-minute walk away, and at that point the wife allows her husband to convince her to return to the hotel. At the river, when Peduzzi helps the husband assemble his fishing equipment, he realizes they forgot to pack sinkers for the bait and so cannot fish. The two finish the bottle of Marsala and make plans to meet again early the next morning. On the way back to the hotel Peduzzi asks for more money, which the husband gives him, knowing he won't see the man again.

== Themes and style ==
"Out of Season" contains themes found throughout In Our Time: men who are weak and powerless (particularly fathers and husbands); finding refuge in sports, the outdoors and alcohol; and the inability to articulate and communicate without confusion. Hemingway critic Wendolyn Tetlow writes that the overall confusion in the story underscores its title. The husband and wife are at odds after an apparent misunderstanding; the waitress is confused at the husband's order; Peduzzi has a secret but the townspeople seem to know what it is. The brown and muddy stream is a wasteland, the weather cold and damp, the husband unable to fish without proper tackle.

Alienation in the modern world is particularly evident in "Out of Season", and is similar to T. S. Eliot's The Waste Land. Hemingway's world, the early-20th century, is "out of season", a place of war, death, tangled relationships, without emotional fulfillment.

== Reception ==
In Our Time received good reviews; Edmund Wilson described the writing as "of the first distinction"; and biographer James Mellow writes the volume is a Hemingway masterpiece. Charles Nolan writes that "Out of Season"'s first sentence "is the kind we have come to expect from Hemingway who had a genius for effective openings."

== Sources ==
- Baker, Carlos (1972). Hemingway: The Writer as Artist. Princeton: Princeton UP. ISBN 978-0-691-01305-3
- Bickford, Sylvester. (1992). "Hemingway's Italian Waste Land: The Complex Unity of 'Out of Season'". in Beegel, Susan F. (ed). Hemingway's Neglected Short Fiction. Tuscaloosa: Alabama UP. ISBN 978-0-8173-0586-4
- Cohen, Milton. (2012). Hemingway's Laboratory: The Paris 'In our Time'. Tuscaloosa: Alabama UP. ISBN 978-0-8173-5728-3
- Hemingway, Ernest. (1925/1930) In Our Time. (1996 ed.) New York: Scribner. ISBN 0-684-82276-8
- Johnston, Kenneth. (1984) "Hemingway and Freud: The Tip of the Iceberg". The Journal of Narrative Technique. Vol. 14, No. 1
- Mellow, James. (1992) Hemingway: A Life Without Consequences. New York: Houghton Mifflin. ISBN 978-0-3953-7777-2
- Nolan, Charles. (1999) "Hemingway's 'Out of Season': The Importance of Close Reading'". Rocky Mountain Review of Language and Literature. Vol. 53, No. 2
- Oliver, Charles. (1999). Ernest Hemingway A to Z: The Essential Reference to the Life and Work. New York: Checkmark Publishing. ISBN 978-0-8160-3467-3
- Smith, Paul. (1996). "1924: Hemingway's Luggage and the Miraculous Year". in Donaldson, Scott (ed). The Cambridge Companion to Ernest Hemingway. New York: Cambridge UP. ISBN 978-0-521-45479-7
- Steinke, James. (1992) "Out of Season" and Hemingway's Neglected Discovery: Ordinary Actuality". in Beegel, Susan, Hemingway's Neglected Short Fiction. Tuscaloosa: Alabama UP. ISBN 978-0-8173-0586-4
- Tetlow, Wendolyn E. (1992). Hemingway's "In Our Time": Lyrical Dimensions. Cranbury NJ: Associated University Presses. ISBN 978-0-8387-5219-7
