= Querencia =

Area of a bullfighting ring

Querencia is a metaphysical concept in the Spanish language. The term comes from the Spanish verb "querer," which means to want, to desire, and to love. The Spanish language dictionary El pequeno Larousse ilustrado (2006) defines it as 1. Inclinacion afectiva hacia alguien o algo. 2. Tendencia de las personas y los animales a volver al lugar en que se criaron. 3. Ese mismo lugar." [1.Emotional inclination toward someone or something. 2.Tendency in people and animals to return to the place where they grew up. 3 That place.] It has also been defined as "homing instinct, a favorite place." [See Larousse Gran Diccionario: Ingles-Espanol Espanol-Ingles.] Another connotation is the place where people feel most secure, gain the strength of their character and feel at home.

The Grijalba/HarperCollins Spanish-English English-Spanish Dictionary (1999) translates the word into English as a) lair, haunt (adding that in bullfighting it means the bull's favorite spot, home ground, haunt); and b) homing instinct or (figuratively) homesickness, longing for home. The phrase buscar [to look for] la querencia can be translated as "to head for home."

In bullfighting, a bull may stake out his querencia, a certain part of the bull ring where he feels strong and safe. Ernest Hemingway's 1932 nonfiction book Death in the Afternoon describes the querencia in this context:

A querencia is a place the bull naturally wants to go to in the ring, a preferred locality...It is a place which develops in the course of the fight where the bull makes his home. It does not usually show at once, but develops in his brain as the fight goes on. In this place he feels that he has his back against the wall and in his querencia he is inestimably more dangerous and almost impossible to kill.

— Ernest Hemingway, Death in the Afternoon

== Relevant literature ==
- Vanessa Fonseca-Chávez, Levi Romero, and Spencer R. Herrera, eds. 2020. Querencia Reflections: on the New Mexico Homeland. Albuquerque: University of New Mexico Press. ISBN 978-0-8263-6160-8
- Arrellano, Juan Estevan. 1997. "La Querencia: La Raza Bioregionalism." New Mexico Historical Review 72: 31-37.
