= 100 Years of the Best American Short Stories =

2015 short story collection edited by Lorrie Moore and Heidi Pitlor

- Editor: Lorrie Moore and Heidi Pitlor
- Language: English
- Series: The Best American Short Stories
- Publisher: Houghton Mifflin Harcourt
- Publication date: July 13, 2015
- Media type: Print
- Pages: 752
- ISBN: 978-0547485850

100 Years of the Best American Short Stories, a volume in The Best American Short Stories series, was edited by Lorrie Moore and Heidi Pitlor. Containing 40 stories spanning 100 years of publication, the volume was published by Houghton Mifflin Harcourt.

== Background ==
The book is a centennial anniversary of The Best American Short Stories series which began in 1915. The series is considered one of the "best-known annual anthologies of short fiction" and has anthologized more than 2,000 short stories, including works by some of the most famous writers in contemporary American literature, curated by well-known guest editors.

In particular, the Willa Cather Review wrote that The Best American Short Stories series "became a repository of values" for creative writing programs, college libraries, and literary magazines.

== Critical reception ==
Kirkus Reviews said the anthology was "packed with some of the best short fiction ever committed to print" and concluded that it was "a collection of uncommonly high value."

Los Angeles Times lamented that Moore, "who made the final selections, did not include any statements about her choices; she instead penned a short story about being an author" and considered the series to be "both essential and problematic."

Chicago Tribune lamented that the anthology "grievously shortchanges the first 50 years" by representing "each pre-1960 decade" with only a few stories each while packing the new millennium with ten stories.

== Short stories included ==
| Year | Author | Story | Source |
1915–1920
| 1917 | Edna Ferber | "The Gay Old Dog" | The Metropolitan Magazine |
1920–1930
| 1921 | Sherwood Anderson | "Brothers" | The Bookman Magazine |
| 1923 | Ernest Hemingway | "My Old Man" | Three Stories and Ten Poems |
| 1925 | Ring Lardner | "Haircut" | Liberty Magazine |
1930–1940
| 1931 | F. Scott Fitzgerald | "Babylon Revisited" | The Saturday Evening Post |
| 1933 | Katherine Anne Porter | "The Cracked Looking-Glass" | Scribner's Magazine |
| 1936 | William Faulkner | "That Will Be Fine" | The American Mercury |
1940–1950
| 1942 | Nancy Hale | "Those Are As Brothers" | Mademoiselle |
| 1948 | Eudora Welty | "The Whole World Knows" | Harper's Bazaar |
| 1948 | John Cheever | "The Enormous Radio" | The New Yorker |
1950–1960
| 1957 | Tillie Olsen | "I Stand Here Ironing" | The Pacific Spectator |
| 1958 | James Baldwin | "Sonny's Blues" | Partisan Review |
| 1959 | Philip Roth | "The Conversion of the Jews" | The Paris Review |
1960–1970
| 1962 | Flannery O'Connor | "Everything That Rises Must Converge" | New World Writing |
| 1962 | John Updike | "Pigeon Feathers" | The New Yorker |
| 1967 | Raymond Carver | "Will You Please Be Quiet, Please?" | December |
| 1969 | Joyce Carol Oates | "By The River" | December |
1970–1980
| 1975 | Donald Barthelme | "The School" | The New Yorker |
| 1978 | Stanley Elkin | "The Conventional Wisdom" | American Review |
1980–1990
| 1980 | Grace Paley | "Friends" | The New Yorker |
| 1982 | Charles Baxter | "Harmony of the World" | The Michigan Quarterly Review |
| 1986 | Mona Simpson | "Lawns" | The Iowa Review |
| 1986 | Richard Ford | "Communist" | Antaeus |
| 1988 | Robert Stone | "Helping" | The New Yorker |
| 1989 | David Wong Louie | "Displacement" | Ploughshares |
1990–2000
| 1991 | Alice Munro | "Friend of My Youth" | The New Yorker |
| 1993 | Mary Gaitskill | "The Girl on the Plane" | Mirabella |
| 1995 | Jamaica Kincaid | "Xuela" | The New Yorker |
| 1996 | Akhil Sharma | "If You Sing Like That for Me" | The Atlantic |
| 1997 | Junot Díaz | "Fiesta, 1980" | Story |
2000–2010
| 2000 | Jhumpa Lahiri | "The Third and Final Continent" | The New Yorker |
| 2000 | ZZ Packer | "Brownies" | Harper's Magazine |
| 2004 | Sherman Alexie | "What You Pawn I Will Redeem" | The New Yorker |
| 2005 | Edward P. Jones | "Old Boys, Old Girls" | The New Yorker |
| 2006 | Benjamin Percy | "Refresh, Refresh" | The Paris Review |
| 2006 | Tobias Wolff | "Awaiting Orders" | The New Yorker |
2010–2015
| 2012 | Nathan Englander | "What We Talk About When We Talk About Anne Frank" | The New Yorker |
| 2012 | Julie Otsuka | "Diem Perdidi" | Granta |
| 2013 | George Saunders | "The Semplica-Girl Diaries" | The New Yorker |
| 2014 | Lauren Groff | "At the Round Earth's Imagined Corners" | Five Points |
