= On the Quai at Smyrna =

Short story by Ernest Hemingway

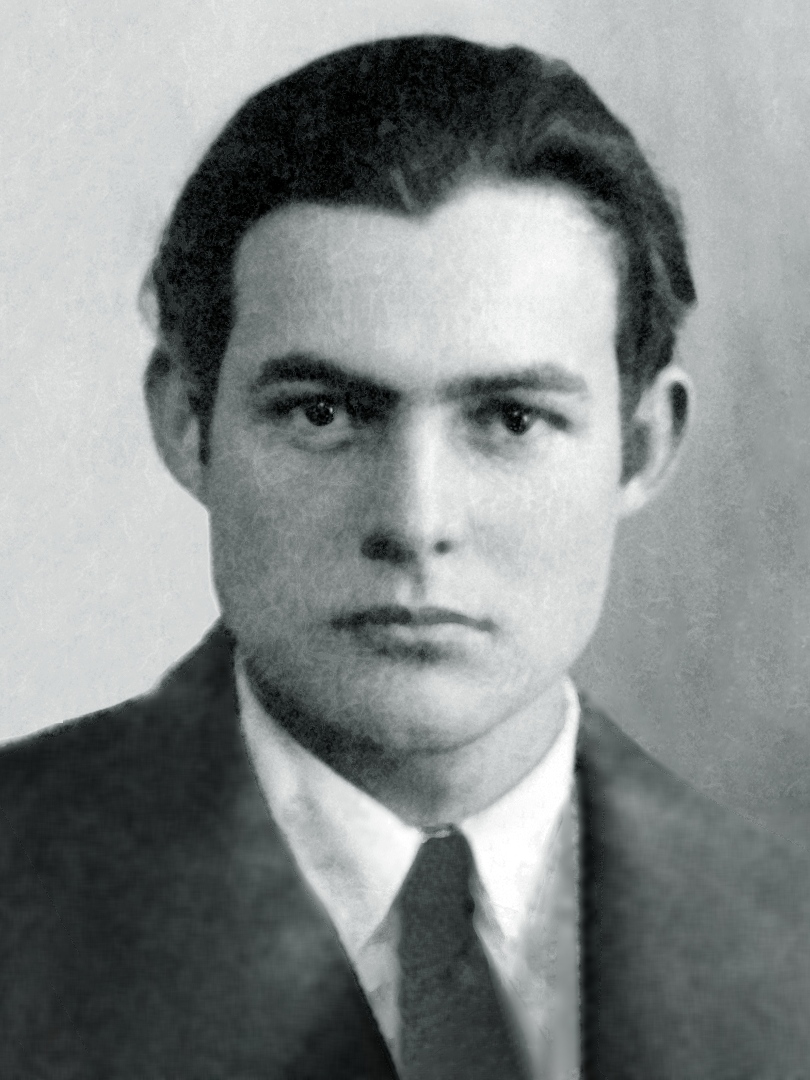
Ernest Hemingway in 1923

"On the Quai at Smyrna" is a short story written by Ernest Hemingway, first published in the 1930 Scribner's edition of the In Our Time collection of short stories, then titled "Introduction by the author". Accompanying it was an introduction by Edmund Wilson. Considered little more than a vignette, the piece was renamed "On the Quai at Smyrna" in the 1938 publication of The Fifth Column and the First Forty-Nine Stories. When In Our Time was reissued in 1955, it led with "On the Quai at Smyrna", replacing "Indian Camp" as the first story of the collection.

== Summary ==
The story is set in Smyrna in 1922 during the aftermath of the Greco-Turkish War. A narrator describes the evacuation of refugees, where naval troops – possibly British – arrive to impose order at the docks. The narrator says about the civilian refugees, "The worst thing was … how they screamed every night at midnight. I do not know why they started screaming. We were in the harbor and they were on the pier and at midnight they started screaming." The narrator tells of the women who have dead infants and refuse to give them up for six days and that his men had to take them away. He mentions "the Turk", who is unpredictable, whose orders prevent rescuing the refugees. His men could have taken the pier, explains the narrator: "They would have blown us out of the water but we would have blown the town simply to hell." He asks his audience, "You remember the harbor. There were plenty of nice things floating around it. That was the only time in my life I got so I dreamed about things." The women who give birth were not as bad as the dead babies, he says; those women only need a dark place and a blanket. About the evacuation he says, "The Greeks were nice chaps too. When they evacuated they had all their baggage animals they couldn't take off with them, so they just broke their forelegs and dumped them in the shallow water."

== Analysis ==
Hemingway critic Thomas Strychacz says that in "On the Quai at Smyrna" Hemingway "explores not the clarity but the terror of events that rupture the boundary of what is rational and comfortably known."

== See also ==
- Greek genocide
- Outline of Greek genocide
- Population exchange between Greece and Turkey
- Burning of Smyrna

== Sources ==
- Oliver, Charles. (1999). Ernest Hemingway A to Z: The Essential Reference to the Life and Work. New York: Checkmark Publishing. ISBN 978-0-8160-3467-3
- Hagemann, E. R. (1983). "'Only Let the Story End as Soon as Possible': Time-and-History in Ernest Hemingway's In Our Time". in Michael Reynolds, (ed). Critical essays on Ernest Hemingway's In our time. Boston: G. K. Hall. ISBN 978-0-8161-8637-2
- Hemingway, Ernest. (1930) In Our Time. (1996 ed). New York: Scribner. ISBN 978-0-684-82276-1
- Reynolds, Michael. (1995). Hemingway's 'In Our Time': The biography of a Book. in Kennedy, Gerald J. (ed). Modern American Short Story Sequences. Cambridge: Cambridge University Press. ISBN 978-0-521-43010-4
- Strychacz, Thomas. (1996). "In Our Time, Out of Season". in Donaldson, Scott (ed). The Cambridge Companion to Ernest Hemingway. New York: Cambridge University Press. ISBN 978-0-521-45479-7
