= Purposeful omission =

Leaving out of nonessential details

Purposeful omission is the leaving out of particular nonessential details that can be assumed by the reader (if used in literature), according to the context and attitudes/gestures made by the characters in the stories. It allows for the reader to make their own abstract representation of the situation at hand.

In the book Why We Fought: America's Wars in Film and History, author Peter Rollins mentions that war movies in the US have purposely omitted some facts so as to make it acceptable to the Pentagon. In their book Representing Lives: Women and Auto/biography, Alison Donnell and Pauline Polkey discuss the difficulty of judging the authenticity of accounts of violence against women when these accounts are made by women in position of prestige and power, as such women are likely to omit some details for the sake of their own image.

According to some authors, purposeful omissions are allowed to carry out the law in spirit and action. In the context of technology, the term is used to denote the avoidance of unwanted or unnecessary feedback.

== See also ==
- Casuistry
- Case-based reasoning
- I know it when I see it
- Iceberg theory
- Show, don't tell
- Concision
