= Iceberg theory =

Writing technique coined by American writer Ernest Hemingway

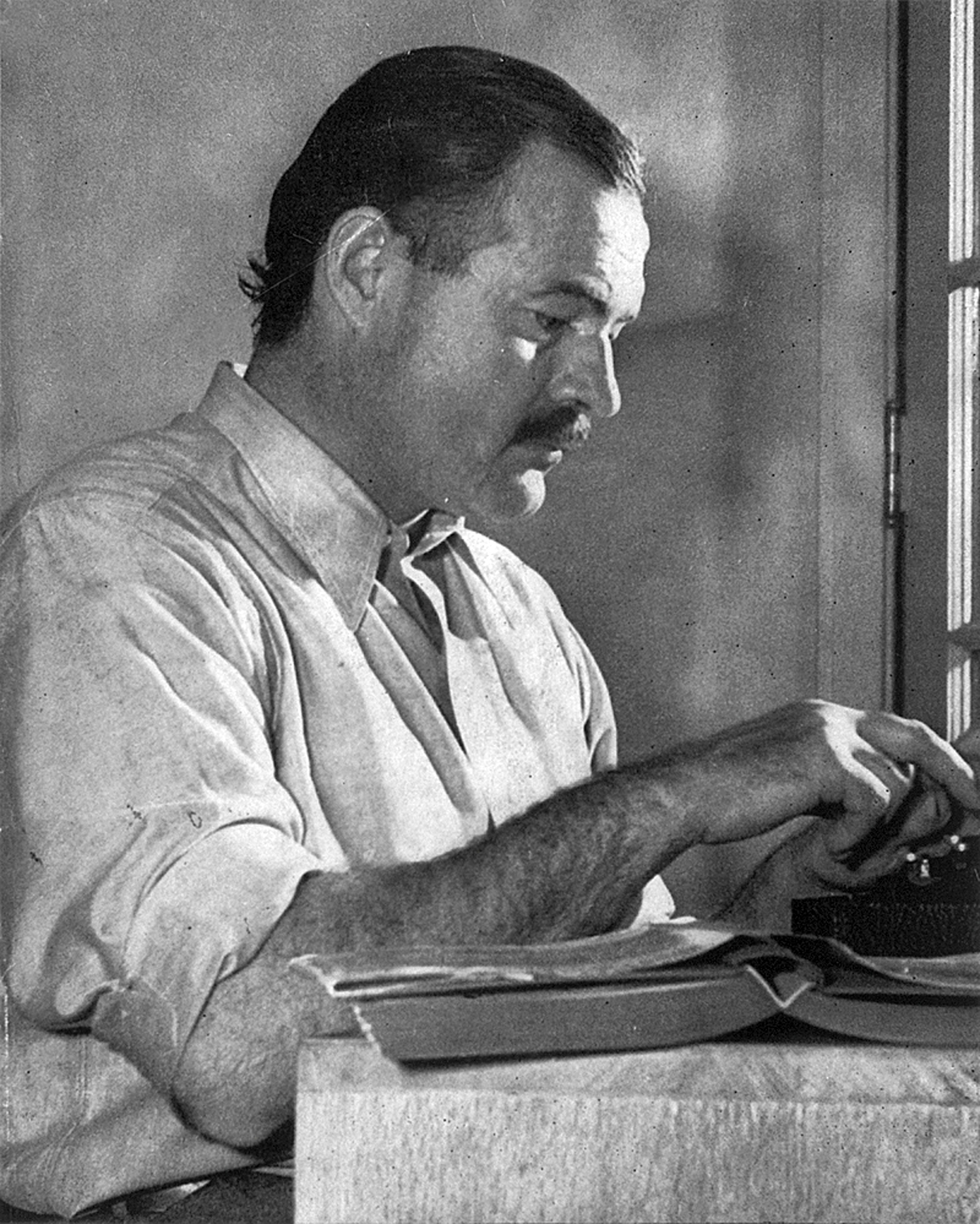
Ernest Hemingway as photographed for the 1940 edition of For Whom the Bell Tolls

The iceberg theory or theory of omission is a writing technique coined by American writer Ernest Hemingway. As a young journalist, Hemingway had to focus his newspaper reports on immediate events, with very little context or interpretation. When he became a writer of short stories, he retained this minimalistic style, focusing on surface elements without explicitly discussing underlying themes. Hemingway believed the deeper meaning of a story should not be evident on the surface, but should shine through implicitly.

== Background ==
Like many other writers, Hemingway worked as a journalist before becoming a novelist. After graduating from high school he went to work as a cub reporter for The Kansas City Star, where he quickly learned that truth often lurks below the surface of a story. He learned about corruption in city politics, and that in hospital emergency rooms and police stations a mask of cynicism was worn "like armour to shield whatever vulnerabilities remained". In his pieces he wrote about relevant events, excluding the background. As foreign correspondent for the Toronto Star, while living in Paris in the early 1920s, he covered the Greco-Turkish War in more than a dozen articles. As his biographer Jeffrey Meyers explains, "he objectively reported only the immediate events in order to achieve a concentration and intensity of focus—a spotlight rather than a stage". From the Greco-Turkish War he gained valuable writing experience that he translated to the writing of fiction. He believed fiction could be based on reality, but that if an experience were to be distilled, as he explained, then "what he made up was truer than what he remembered".

== Definition ==
If a writer of prose knows enough of what he is writing about he may omit things that he knows and the reader, if the writer is writing truly enough, will have a feeling of those things as strongly as though the writer had stated them. The dignity of movement of an ice-berg is due to only one-eighth of it being above water. A writer who omits things because he does not know them only makes hollow places in his writing.

— Ernest Hemingway, Death in the Afternoon

In 1923, Hemingway conceived of the idea of a new theory of writing after finishing his short story "Out of Season". In A Moveable Feast (1964), his posthumously published memoirs about his years as a young writer in Paris, he explains: "I omitted the real end [of "Out of Season"] which was that the old man hanged himself. This was omitted on my new theory that you could omit anything... and the omitted part would strengthen the story." In chapter sixteen of Death in the Afternoon he compares his theory about writing to an iceberg.

Hemingway's biographer Carlos Baker believed that as a writer of short stories Hemingway learned "how to get the most from the least, how to prune language and avoid waste motion, how to multiply intensities, and how to tell nothing but the truth in a way that allowed for telling more than the truth." Baker also notes that the writing style of the "iceberg theory" suggests that a story's narrative and nuanced complexities, complete with symbolism, operate under the surface of the story itself.

For example, Hemingway believed a writer could describe an action, such as Nick Adams fishing in "Big Two-Hearted River", while conveying a different message about the action itself—Nick Adams concentrating on fishing to the extent that he does not have to think about the unpleasantness of his war experience. In his essay "The Art of the Short Story", Hemingway is clear about his method: "A few things I have found to be true. If you leave out important things or events that you know about, the story is strengthened. If you leave or skip something because you do not know it, the story will be worthless. The test of any story is how very good the stuff that you, not your editors, omit." A writer explained how it brings a story gravitas:

Hemingway said that only the tip of the iceberg showed in fiction—your reader will see only what is above the water—but the knowledge that you have about your character that never makes it into the story acts as the bulk of the iceberg. And that is what gives your story weight and gravitas.

— Jenna Blum in The Author at Work, 2013

From reading Rudyard Kipling, Hemingway absorbed the practice of shortening prose as much as it could take. Of the concept of omission, Hemingway wrote in "The Art of the Short Story": "You could omit anything if you knew that you omitted and the omitted part would strengthen the story and make people feel something more than they understood." By making invisible the structure of the story, he believed the author strengthened the piece of fiction and that the "quality of a piece could be judged by the quality of the material the author eliminated." His style added to the aesthetic: using "declarative sentences and direct representations of the visible world" with simple and plain language, Hemingway became "the most influential prose stylist in the twentieth century" according to biographer Myers.

In her paper "Hemingway's Camera Eye", Zoe Trodd explains that Hemingway uses repetition in prose to build a collage of snapshots to create an entire picture. Of his iceberg theory, she claims, it "is also a glacier waterfall, infused with movement by his multi-focal aesthetic". Furthermore, she believes that Hemingway's iceberg theory "demanded that the reader feel the whole story" and that the reader is meant to "fill the gaps left by his omissions with their feelings".

Hemingway scholar Jackson Benson believes Hemingway used autobiographical details to work as framing devices to write about life in general—not only about his life. For example, Benson postulates that Hemingway used his experiences and drew them out further with "what if" scenarios: "what if I were wounded in such a way that I could not sleep at night? What if I were wounded and made crazy, what would happen if I were sent back to the front?" By separating himself from the characters he created, Hemingway strengthens the drama. The means of achieving a strong drama is to minimize, or omit, the feelings that produced the fiction he wrote.

== Early fiction and short stories ==
Wendolyn Tetlow believes that Hemingway's early fiction such as "Indian Camp" shows his lack of concern for character development by simply placing the character in his or her surroundings. However, in "Indian Camp" the use of descriptive detail such as a screaming woman, men smoking tobacco, and an infected wound build a sense of veracity. In other words, a story can communicate by subtext; for instance, Hemingway's "Hills Like White Elephants" does not mention the name of the procedure, although in the story the male character seems to be attempting to convince his girlfriend to do it. "Big Two-Hearted River", Hemingway explains, "is about a boy ... coming home from the war ... So the war, all mention of the war, anything about the war, is omitted." Hemingway intentionally left out something in "Indian Camp" and "Big Two-Hearted River"—two stories he considered to be good.

Baker explains that Hemingway's stories about sports are often about the athletes themselves and that the sport is incidental to the story. Moreover, the story "A Clean, Well-Lighted Place" which on the surface is about nothing more than men drinking in a cafe late at night, is in fact about that which brings the men to the cafe to drink, and the reasons they seek light in the night—none of which is available in the surface of the plot, but lurks in the iceberg below. Hemingway's story "Big Two-Hearted River" is ostensibly about nothing, as is "A Clean, Well-Lighted Place", but within nothing lies the crux of the story.

== Novels ==
Hemingway scholar Jackson Benson further believes that the omission Hemingway applies functions as a sort of buffer between himself as the creator of a character and the character. He explains that as an author creates a "distance" between himself and the character he "becomes more practiced, it would seem." Benson says in Hemingway's fiction the distance is necessary, and successful in early fiction such as in The Sun Also Rises, but if "the author does not deliberately create such distance the fiction fails," as in the later works such as Across the River and into the Trees.

Baker calls Hemingway's Across the River and into the Trees a "lyric-poetical novel" in which each scene has an underlying truth presented via symbolism. According to Meyers an example of omission is that Renata, like other heroines in Hemingway's fiction, suffers a major "shock"—the murder of her father and the subsequent loss of her home—to which Hemingway alludes only briefly. Hemingway's pared down narrative forces the reader to solve connections. As Stoltzfus remarks: "Hemingway walks the reader to the bridge that he must cross alone without the narrator's help."

Hemingway believed that if context or background had been written about by another, and written about well, then it could be left out of his writing. Of The Old Man and the Sea he explains: "In writing you are limited by what has already been done satisfactorily. So I have tried to do something else. First I have tried to eliminate everything unnecessary to conveying experience to the reader so that after he has read something it will become part of his experience and seem actually to have happened." Paul Smith, author of Hemingway's Early Manuscript: The Theory and Practice of Omission, believes Hemingway applied the theory of omission in an effort to "strengthen [the] iceberg".

== Legacy ==
In October 1954, Hemingway received the Nobel Prize in Literature. He jokingly told the press he believed Carl Sandburg and Isak Dinesen deserved the prize more than him, but the prize money would be welcome. The prize was awarded to Hemingway "for his mastery of the art of narrative, most recently demonstrated in The Old Man and the Sea, and for the influence that he has exerted on contemporary style." A few days after the announcement, Hemingway spoke with a Time magazine correspondent while on his boat fishing off the coast of Cuba. When asked about the use of symbolism in his work, and particularly in the most recently published Old Man and the Sea, he explained:

No good book has ever been written that has in it symbols arrived at beforehand and stuck in ... That kind of symbol sticks out like raisins in raisin bread. Raisin bread is all right, but plain bread is better. ... I tried to make a real old man, a real boy, a real sea, a real fish and real sharks. But if I made them good and true enough they would mean many things. The hardest thing is to make something really true and sometimes truer than true.

== See also ==
- Abductive reasoning
- Case-based reasoning
- Casuistry
- Concision
- For sale: baby shoes, never worn
- Gonzo journalism
- I know it when I see it
- Purposeful omission
- Show, don't tell

== Sources ==
- Baker, Carlos (1972). Hemingway: The Writer as Artist (4th ed.). Princeton University Press. ISBN 0-691-01305-5.
- Benson, Jackson (1989). "Ernest Hemingway: The Life as Fiction and the Fiction as Life". American Literature. 61 (3): 345–358. doi:10.2307/2926824. JSTOR 2926824.
- Hemingway, Ernest (1990). "The Art of the Short Story". In Benson, Jackson (ed.). New Critical Approaches to the Short Stories of Ernest Hemingway. Duke University Press. ISBN 978-0-8223-1067-9.
- Mellow, James R. (1992). Hemingway: A Life Without Consequences. New York: Houghton Mifflin. ISBN 0-395-37777-3.
- Meyers, Jeffrey (1985). Hemingway: A Biography. London: Macmillan. ISBN 0-333-42126-4.
- Oliver, Charles M. (1999). Ernest Hemingway A to Z: The Essential Reference to the Life and Work. New York: Checkmark. ISBN 0-8160-3467-2.
- Plimpton, George (Spring 1958). "Ernest Hemingway, The Art of Fiction No. 21". The Paris Review. Spring 1958 (18).
- Reynolds, Michael S. (1998). The Young Hemingway. New York: Norton. ISBN 0-393-31776-5.
- Smith, Paul (1983). "Hemingway's Early Manuscripts: The Theory and Practice of Omission". Journal of Modern Literature. 10 (2). Indiana University Press: 268–288. JSTOR 3831126.
- Stoltzfus, Ben (2003). "The Stones of Venice, Time and Remembrance: Calculus and Proust in Across the River and into the Trees". The Hemingway Review. 22 (2): 20–29. doi:10.1353/hem.2003.0000. S2CID 162371637.
- Tetlow, Wendolyn (1992). Hemingway's In our time: lyrical dimensions. Cranbury NJ: Associated University Presses. ISBN 0-8387-5219-5.
- Trodd, Zoe (2007). "Hemingway's camera eye: The problems of language and an interwar politics of form". The Hemingway Review. 26 (2): 7–21. doi:10.1353/hem.2007.0012. S2CID 146219031.
