= The Three-Day Blow =

Short story by Ernest Hemingway

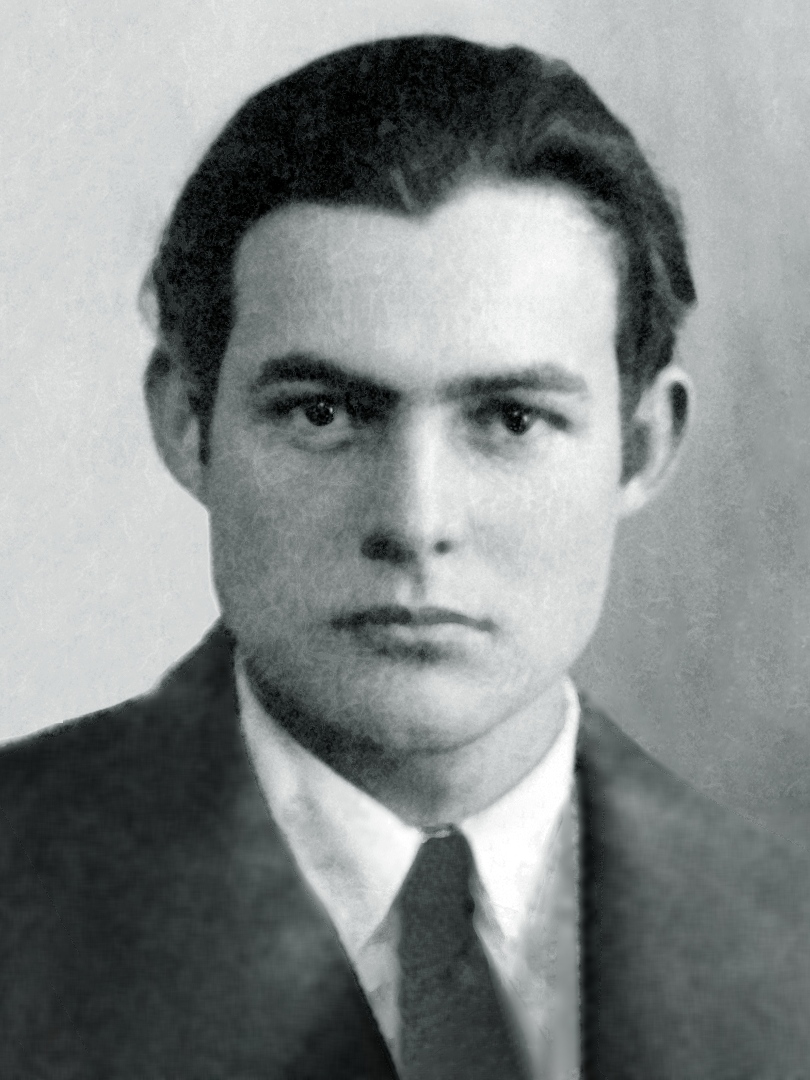
Ernest Hemingway in 1923

"The Three-Day Blow" is a short story written by Ernest Hemingway, published in the 1925 New York edition of In Our Time, by Boni & Liveright. The story is the fourth in the collection to feature Nick Adams, Hemingway's autobiographical alter ego.

== Plot summary ==
The story is about Nick and Bill and takes place at Bill's father's cottage, where the two get drunk. The story begins with Nick walking around the orchard near the cabin. He picks up a Wagner apple and puts it in his pocket. Nick climbs the stairs to the cottage and Bill meets him at the door, telling Nick that Bill's father is out in the woods with his gun. Bill and Nick stand together, looking out across the fields. They discuss the wind for the first time, with Bill saying “it will blow like that for three days.”

After they go inside the cottage, they decide to drink. The two begin to discuss a variety of topics while drinking, such as different books they're reading. Bill likes G. K. Chesterton, while Nick prefers Hugh Walpole. They also discuss baseball; apparently, the two of them are both fans of the St. Louis Cardinals, but Nick thinks that some of the games they lose are rigged, claiming “there’s always more to it than we know about.” They continue to drink and add logs to the fire. The topic of conversation moves onto their fathers and their differing occupations. Nick's dad is a doctor, while Bill's is a painter.

Finally, after many drinks, Bill mentions Nick's recent breakup. At first it seems to bother Nick a lot, claiming that everything was finished and gone and that he would never see her again. However, the two decide to “get really drunk,” and Nick changes his mind, claiming that “nothing was finished.” He resolves to go to town on Saturday because “there’s always a chance.”

== Analysis ==
The End of Something and "The Three-Day Blow", are linked thematically. In the first Nick breaks up with his girlfriend, in the second he gets drunk and denies the relationship has ended. They are written in counterpoint, in which feelings of loss, anger, and evil are ignored or repressed.

== Sources ==
- Oliver, Charles. (1999). Ernest Hemingway A to Z: The Essential Reference to the Life and Work. New York: Checkmark Publishing. ISBN 978-0-8160-3467-3
- Tetlow, Wendolyn E. (1992). Hemingway's "In Our Time": Lyrical Dimensions. Cranbury NJ: Associated University Presses. ISBN 978-0-8387-5219-7
