= James R. Mellow =

American art critic and biographer

James Robert Mellow (February 28, 1926 — November 22, 1997) was an American art critic and biographer. After starting his art career in the mid 1950s, Mellow primarily worked in editorial positions for Arts Magazine and Industrial Design during the 1960s. As an art critic from the mid 1960s to mid 1970s, Mellow worked for The New Leader, Art International, and The New York Times. Apart from art, Mellow became a biographer in 1974 when he released a biography on Gertrude Stein.

From 1980 to 1992, Mellow released further biographies on Nathaniel Hawthorne, F. Scott Fitzgerald and Zelda Fitzgerald, and Ernest Hemingway. For his completed works, Mellow received a National Book Award nomination for Charmed Circle: Gertrude Stein & Company. When the National Book Award was replaced with the American Book Award, Mellow won the 1983 paperback autobiography/biography category for Nathaniel Hawthorne In His Times. That year, Mellow also received a Guggenheim Fellowship. For his final publication, Mellow's biography on Walker Evans was posthumously released in 1999 after Mellow died during the writing process.

== Early life and education ==
Mellow was born in Gloucester, Massachusetts on February 28, 1926. During the mid 1940s, Mellow was a member of the United States Army Air Forces. For his post-secondary education, Mellow received a Bachelor of Science in 1950 from Northwestern University.

== Career ==
In 1955, Mellow began working at Arts Magazine in charge of their assembly process before being named editor-in-chief for the magazine in 1961. As an editor, Mellow worked for Industrial Design from 1965 to 1969. Outside of editing, Mellow was an art critic from 1965 to 1974. During this time period, he criticized for The New Leader, Art International, and The New York Times.

During his criticism career, Mellow received requests to pen a biography on Gertrude Stein following an article he wrote for The New York Times. In 1974, Mellow released his Stein biography titled Charmed Circle: Gertrude Stein and Company. In 1980, Mellow continued to write biographies with the publication of Nathaniel Hawthorne: In His Times. Following his Nathaniel Hawthorne book, Mellow focused on F. Scott Fitzgerald and Zelda Fitzgerald for his 1984 publication Invented Lives: F. Scott and Zelda Fitzgerald. In 1992, Mellow released a biography on Ernest Hemingway titled Hemingway: A Life Without Consequences.

With his 1992 biography on Hemingway, Mellow finished his books about the Lost Generation following his biographies on Stein and the Fitzgeralds. After his Hemingway biography, Mellow began writing a biography on Walker Evans during the early 1990s. Before his death in 1997, Mellow wrote about Evans's life from 1903 to 1956 and planned out the end of his biography. When Walker Evans was posthumously published in 1999, it included Mellow's writings and a summary of Evans's lifetime from 1957 to 1975. Apart from biographies, Mellow was an editor on The Best in Arts in 1962 and New York: The Art World in 1964. He also released monographs on Jim Dine and Pablo Picasso during the early 1980s.

== Writing style ==
Mellow opened each of his biographies with a turning point that happened in his subject's life. With his selected turning points, Mellow also linked the events to his subjects social surroundings. Throughout his works, Mellow incorporated various information about his biographical subjects including previous biographies and personal correspondence.

== Awards and honors ==
In 1975, Mellow was nominated for the National Book Award in the biography category with Charmed Circle: Gertrude Stein & Company. While the National Book Award was replaced with the American Book Award during the 1980s, Mellow was nominated for the 1981 American Book Award in the hardcover autobiography/biography category for Nathaniel Hawthorne In His Times. Years later, Nathaniel Hawthorne In His Times earned Mellow the 1983 American Book Award in the paperback autobiography/biography category. Mellow received a Guggenheim Fellowship in biography in 1983.

== Death ==
On November 22, 1997, Mellow died in Rockport, Massachusetts from a heart attack and was survived by his partner, Augustin (Augie) Capaccio, his companion of 46 years.
