= Bill Bird =

American journalist

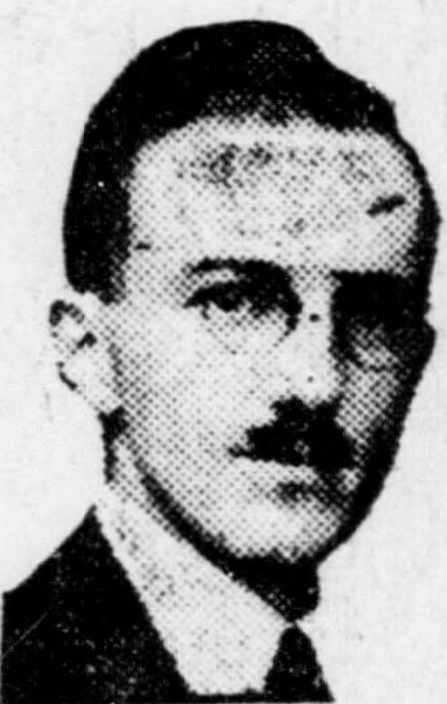
- Photo of Bill Bird from 1925
- Born: William Augustus Bird; 1888; Buffalo, New York, United States
- Died: 1963 (aged 74–75)
- Writing career
- Language: English
- Genres: Journalism, publishing

William Augustus Bird (1888–1963) was an American journalist, now remembered for his Three Mountains Press, a small press he ran while in Paris in the 1920s for the Consolidated Press Association. Taken over by Nancy Cunard in 1928, it became the Hours Press, and continued its association with many of the most important modernists; Ezra Pound had a position as editor for Three Mountains from 1923.

Bill Bird, as he was usually known, was born in Buffalo, New York. He was educated at Trinity College, Hartford. With David Lawrence he founded Consolidated Press Association in 1920; it lasted until 1933.

He started Three Mountains Press in 1922, producing books himself by a slow process of hand printing (the mountains appeared on the colophon). An early work was his own A Practical Guide to French Wines (1922). It was based at 29, quai d'Anjou, where he later provided office accommodation to Ford Madox Ford for the Transatlantic Review. It was through Ernest Hemingway that Bird contacted Pound.

In the period to 1925 the Press published works including Pound's A Draft of XVI Cantos, Hemingway's in our time, William Carlos Williams's The Great American Novel, and Distinguished Air by Robert McAlmon. On the business side there was a close involvement with McAlmon's Contact Editions. Bird's interest then dropped, and he sold the printing press, Caslon type and goodwill to Nancy Cunard, supervising the move to her Normandy farmhouse.

His career as journalist outlasted the CPA: he next worked for the New York Sun, remaining in Paris until 1940. He moved at that point to Spain.

After World War II he was in Tangier, where he edited the Tangier Gazette English-language newspaper until it was closed in 1960.
