= Three Stories and Ten Poems =

Book by Ernest Hemingway

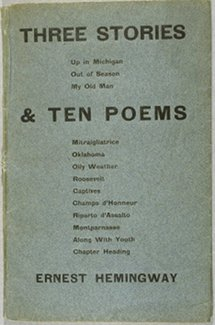

Three Stories and Ten Poems is a collection of short stories and poems by Ernest Hemingway. It was privately published in 1923 in a run of 300 copies by Robert McAlmon's "Contact Publishing" in Paris.

The three stories are:

- "Up in Michigan"
- "Out of Season"
- "My Old Man"

The ten poems are:

- "Mitraigliatrice"
- "Oklahoma"
- "Oily Weather"
- "Roosevelt"
- "Captives"
- "Champs d'Honneur"
- "Riparto d'Assalto"
- "Montparnasse"
- "Along With Youth"
- "Chapter Heading"
