= The Transatlantic Review =

The Transatlantic Review (often styled the transatlantic review) was an influential monthly literary magazine edited by Ford Madox Ford in 1924. The magazine was based in Paris but was published in London by Gerald Duckworth and Company.

Although it published only 12 issues—one in each month in 1924—the magazine had an influential impact on early 20th-century English literature by publishing works such as an early extract from James Joyce's Finnegans Wake. The magazine also contained works by Djuna Barnes, Jean Cassou, H.D., Ernest Hemingway, Selma Lagerlöf, Jean Rhys, Gertrude Stein, and Baroness Elsa von Freytag-Loringhoven. The magazine was funded by John Quinn, who had been persuaded by Ezra Pound to give money to Ford for the publication of a literary magazine. Ernest Hemingway was the guest editor of the August 1924 edition.

In 1959, Joseph F. McCrindle founded a literary magazine and named it the Transatlantic Review in honour of Ford's 1924 magazine.
