= Carlos Baker =

American writer, biographer, and academic (1909–1987)

- Born: May 5, 1909; Biddeford, Maine
- Died: April 18, 1987 (aged 77); Princeton, New Jersey
- Education: Dartmouth College (A.B.), Harvard University. Princeton University
- Occupations: Writer and professor

Carlos Baker (May 5, 1909 – April 18, 1987) was an American writer, biographer and professor of Literature at Princeton University. Baker was born in 1909 in Biddeford, Maine. He received his A.B. from Dartmouth College and his M.A. from Harvard University. He received his Ph.D. in English from Princeton University in 1940 after completing a doctoral dissertation titled "The influence of Spenser on Shelley's major poetry." Baker taught at Princeton for forty years, retiring in 1977; for much of this time he held the position of Woodrow Wilson Professor of English Literature. He is best remembered for his literary biographies, but his published works also include several novels and books of poetry as well as works of literary criticism and essays. He also wrote for the popular press; his syndicated reviews of works such as Jack Kerouac's On the Road (which Baker described as a "dizzy travelogue") appeared in dozens of newspapers.

In 1969, Baker published a well-regarded scholarly biography of Ernest Hemingway, Ernest Hemingway: A Life Story, in which he described him as a "fierce individualist ... who believed that that government is best which governs least". In "Selected Letters of Martha Gellhorn", Hemingway's third wife, Gellhorn criticizes Baker's assertions concerning her affair and marriage to Hemingway, and indicates that Baker was frequently wrong about those matters she experienced personally, and which Baker wrote about. Hemingway never met Baker according to Hemingway's fourth wife, Mary Welsh Hemingway, who also asserts in her 1976 book How It Was that Hemingway deliberately chose someone who never knew him. Mary does not offer a specific reason for this choice; Baker had published Hemingway: The Writer as Artist in 1952, which favorably treated Hemingway's work to that date.

Baker's other major works included biographies of Percy Bysshe Shelley and Ralph Waldo Emerson. Baker's minor work includes A Year and A Day, Poems by Carlos Baker. Baker taught biographer A. Scott Berg while Berg was an undergraduate at Princeton in the late 1960s. Berg recalled that Baker "changed my life", and convinced him to quit acting to concentrate on his thesis, a study of editor Maxwell Perkins. Berg eventually expanded his thesis into the National Book Award-winning biography Max Perkins: Editor of Genius (1978), which he dedicated in part to Baker.

Baker was elected to the American Philosophical Society in 1982. He died in 1987 at Princeton, New Jersey, aged 77.
