= Death in the Afternoon =

1932 book by Ernest Hemingway

- Book cover with color facsimile of "The Bullfighter" by Roberto Domingo.
- Author: Ernest Hemingway
- Cover artist: Roberto Domingo
- Language: English
- Subject: Bullfighting
- Genre: Travel literature
- Publisher: Charles Scribner's Sons
- Publication date: 1932
- Publication place: United States
- Pages: 517

Death in the Afternoon is a non-fiction book written by Ernest Hemingway about the history, ceremony and traditions of Spanish bullfighting, published in 1932. It also contains a deeper contemplation on the nature of fear and courage. While essentially a guide book, there are three main sections: Hemingway's work, pictures, and a glossary of terms.

== Contents ==
Hemingway became a bullfighting fan after seeing the Pamplona Festival of San Fermín in the 1920s. He wrote about the tradition in the novel The Sun Also Rises. In Death in the Afternoon, Hemingway explores the metaphysics of bullfighting—the ritualized, almost religious practice—that he considered analogous to the writer's search for meaning and the essence of life. In bullfighting, he found the elemental nature of life and death. Marianne Wiggins has written of Death in the Afternoon: "Read it for the writing, for the way it's told... He'll make you like it [bullfighting]... You read enough and long enough, he'll make you love it, he's relentless".

In his writings on Spain, Hemingway was influenced by the Spanish master Pío Baroja. When Hemingway won the Nobel Prize, he traveled to see Baroja, then on his death bed, specifically to tell him he thought Baroja deserved the prize more than he.

Death in the Afternoon was published by Scribner's on 23 September 1932 to a first edition print run of approximately 10,000 copies.
