= Ernest Hemingway: The Collected Stories =

Posthumous collection of short fiction by Hemingway

First edition

Ernest Hemingway: The Collected Stories is a posthumous collection of Hemingway's short fiction, published in 1995. Introduced by James Fenton, it is published in the UK only by Random House as part of the Everyman's Library. The collection is split in two parts.

Part One contains the four individual collections of stories Hemingway published during his lifetime. They are the tiny experimental prose volume, in our time (1924), the much expanded In Our Time (1925, with an extra story added in 1930), Men Without Women (1927) and Winner Take Nothing (1933). In addition, four further stories were first published in Hemingway's first omnibus, The Fifth Column and the First Forty-Nine Stories (1938).

Part Two contains anomalous stories which were added to the collections Hemingway (and others) have since published. It is also includes some stories, fragments and juvenilia that have never before been published in book-form. The collection does, however, limit itself to material that had already appeared in print.

Some material, first published in The Complete Short Stories (1987), is not included in this edition, as Fenton determined that it was not properly classified as short stories. This includes "One Trip Across" and "Tradesman's Return" (the first two parts of To Have and Have Not); and "An African Story" (filleted from various chapters of The Garden of Eden—itself a posthumous novel).

== Part One: Stories Collected in Hemingway's Lifetime ==
- From Three Stories and Ten Poems (1923)
  - Up in Michigan (1923, revised 1938)
- in our time (1924)
- In Our Time (1925 and 1930)
  - On the Quai at Smyrna
  - Indian Camp
  - The Doctor and the Doctor's Wife
  - The End of Something
  - The Three-Day Blow
  - The Battler
  - A Very Short Story
  - Soldier's Home
  - The Revolutionist
  - Mr. and Mrs. Elliot
  - Cat in the Rain
  - Out of Season
  - Cross-Country Snow
  - My Old Man
  - Big Two-Hearted River, Part I
  - Big Two-Hearted River, Part II
- Men Without Women (1927)
  - The Undefeated
  - In Another Country
  - Hills Like White Elephants
  - The Killers
  - Che Ti Dice La Patria?
  - Fifty Grand
  - A Simple Enquiry
  - Ten Indians
  - A Canary for One
  - An Alpine Idyll
  - A Pursuit Race
  - Today is Friday
  - Banal Story
  - Now I Lay Me
- Winner Take Nothing (1933)
  - After the Storm
  - A Clean, Well-Lighted Place
  - The Light of the World
  - God Rest You Merry, Gentlemen
  - The Sea Change
  - A Way You'll Never Be
  - The Mother of a Queen
  - One Reader Writes
  - Homage to Switzerland
  - A Day's Wait
  - A Natural History of the Dead
  - Wine of Wyoming
  - The Gambler, the Nun, and the Radio
  - Fathers and Sons
- Stories from The Fifth Column and the First Forty-Nine Stories (1938)
  - The Capital of the World (1936)
  - The Snows of Kilimanjaro (1936)
  - The Short Happy Life of Francis Macomber (1936)
  - Old Man at the Bridge (1938)

== Part Two: Stories and Fragments from Posthumous Collections ==
- Uncollected Stories published in Hemingway's Lifetime
  - The Denunciation (1938)
  - The Butterfly and the Tank (1938)
  - Night Before Battle (1939)
  - Under the Ridge (1939)
  - Nobody Ever Dies (1939)
  - The Good Lion (1951)
  - The Faithful Bull (1951)
  - A Man of the World (1957)
  - Get a Seeing-Eyed Dog (1957)
- Drafts and Fragments first published in The Nick Adams Stories (1972)
  - Three Shots
  - The Indians Moved Away
  - The Last Good Country
  - Crossing the Mississippi
  - Night Before Landing
  - Summer People
  - Wedding Day
  - On Writing
- First published in The Complete Short Stories (1987)
  - A Train Trip
  - The Porter
  - Black Ass at the Crossroads
  - Landscape with Figures
  - I Guess Everything Reminds You of Something
  - Great News from the Mainland
  - The Strange Country
- Juvenilia and Pre-Paris Stories
  - Judgment of Manitou (1916)
  - A Matter of Colour (1916)
  - Sepi Jingan (1916)
  - The Mercenaries (1985)
  - Crossroads – an Anthology (1985)
  - Portrait of the Idealist in Love (1985)
  - The Ash Heel's Tendon (1985)
  - The Current (1985)
