= The Complete Short Stories of Ernest Hemingway =

Posthumous collection of Ernest Hemingway's short fiction

The Complete Short Stories of Ernest Hemingway: The Finca Vigía Edition
- First edition
- Author: Ernest Hemingway
- Language: English
- Genre: Short story anthology
- Publisher: Scribner
- Publication date: 1987
- Publication place: United States
- Media type: Print
- Pages: 650
- ISBN: 0684186683

The Complete Short Stories of Ernest Hemingway: The Finca Vigía Edition, is a posthumous collection of Ernest Hemingway's (July 21, 1899 – July 2, 1961) short fiction, published in 1987. It contains the classic First Forty-Nine Stories as well as 21 other stories and a foreword by his sons.

Only a small handful of stories published during Hemingway's lifetime are not included in The First Forty-Nine. Five stories were written concerning the Spanish Civil War: "The Denunciation", "The Butterfly and the Tank", "Night Before Battle", "Under The Ridge", and "Nobody Ever Dies". Excepting "Nobody Ever Dies", these stories were collected in a posthumous 1969 volume with his play, entitled The Fifth Column and Four Stories of the Spanish Civil War. Chicote's bar and the Hotel Florida in Madrid are recurrent settings in these stories.

In March 1951, Holiday magazine published two of Hemingway's short children's stories, "The Good Lion" and "The Faithful Bull". Two more short stories were to appear in Hemingway's lifetime: "Get A Seeing-Eyed Dog" and "A Man Of The World", both in the December 20, 1957 issue of the Atlantic Monthly.

The seven unpublished stories included in The Complete Short Stories of Ernest Hemingway: The Finca Vigía Edition are "A Train Trip", "The Porter", "Black Ass at the Cross Roads", "Landscape with Figures", "I Guess Everything Reminds You of Something", "Great News from the Mainland", and "The Strange Country".

In addition, this volume includes "An African Story", which was derived from the unfinished and heavily edited posthumous novel The Garden of Eden (1986), and two parts of the 1937 novel To Have And Have Not, "One Trip Across" (Cosmopolitan, May 1934) and "The Tradesman's Return" (Esquire, February 1936), in their original magazine versions.

The collection is not, despite the title, complete. After Hemingway's suicide, Scribner put out a collection called The Nick Adams Stories (1972) which contains many old stories already collected in The First Forty-Nine as well as some previously unpublished pieces (much of it material that Hemingway clearly rejected). From the new material, only "The Last Good Country" (part of an unfinished novella) and "Summer People" are included in this volume. Hemingway's complete short fiction is collected in The Collected Stories (1995), published by Everyman's Library in the United Kingdom only and introduced by James Fenton. Eschewing the pieces collected in The Garden of Eden and To Have and Have Not, Fenton's collection includes all the pieces from The Nick Adams Stories as well as a number of pieces of juvenilia and pre-Paris stories.

== Part I: First Forty-Nine Stories ==
- Stories from The Fifth Column and the First Forty-Nine Stories (1938)
  - The Short Happy Life of Francis Macomber (1936)
  - The Capital of the World (1936)
  - The Snows of Kilimanjaro (1936)
  - Old Man at the Bridge (1938)
- From Three Stories and Ten Poems (1923)
  - Up in Michigan (1923, revised 1938)
- In Our Time (1925 and 1930)
  - On the Quai at Smyrna
  - Indian Camp (1924)
  - The Doctor and the Doctor's Wife (1925)
  - The End of Something (1925)
  - The Three-Day Blow (1925)
  - The Battler (1925)
  - A Very Short Story (1924)
  - Soldier's Home (1925)
  - The Revolutionist (1925)
  - Mr. and Mrs. Elliot (1924)
  - Cat in the Rain (1925)
  - Out of Season
  - Cross-Country Snow (1924)
  - My Old Man
  - Big Two-Hearted River, Part I (1925)
  - Big Two-Hearted River, Part II (1925)
- Men Without Women (1927)
  - The Undefeated
  - In Another Country
  - Hills Like White Elephants
  - The Killers
  - Che Ti Dice La Patria?
  - Fifty Grand
  - A Simple Enquiry
  - Ten Indians
  - A Canary for One
  - An Alpine Idyll
  - A Pursuit Race
  - Today is Friday
  - Banal Story
  - Now I Lay Me
- Winner Take Nothing (1933)
  - After the Storm
  - A Clean, Well-Lighted Place
  - The Light of the World
  - God Rest You Merry, Gentlemen
  - The Sea Change
  - A Way You'll Never Be
  - The Mother of a Queen
  - One Reader Writes
  - Homage to Switzerland
  - A Day's Wait
  - A Natural History of the Dead
  - Wine of Wyoming
  - The Gambler, the Nun, and the Radio
  - Fathers and Sons

== Part II: Short Stories Published in Books or Magazines Subsequent to the First Forty-Nine Stories ==
- From To Have and Have Not
  - One Trip Across (1934)
  - The Tradesman's Return (1936)
- Uncollected stories published in Hemingway's lifetime
  - The Denunciation (1938)
  - The Butterfly and the Tank (1938)
  - Night Before Battle (1939)
  - Under the Ridge (1939)
  - Nobody Ever Dies (1939)
  - The Good Lion (1951)
  - The Faithful Bull (1951)
  - Get a Seeing-Eyed Dog (1957)
  - A Man of the World (1957)
- First published in The Nick Adams Stories (1972)
  - Summer People
  - The Last Good Country
- From The Garden of Eden (1986)
  - An African Story

== Part III: Previously Unpublished Fiction ==
- A Train Trip
- The Porter
- Black Ass at the Crossroads
- Landscape with Figures
- I Guess Everything Reminds You of Something
- Great News from the Mainland
- The Strange Country
