= The Fifth Column and the First Forty-Nine Stories =

Anthology of writings by Ernest Hemingway

- Author: Ernest Hemingway
- Language: English
- Genre: Short story collection
- Publisher: Charles Scribner's Sons
- Publication date: 1938
- Publication place: United States
- Media type: Book
- Preceded by: To Have and Have Not
- Followed by: For Whom the Bell Tolls

The Fifth Column and the First Forty-Nine Stories is an anthology of writings by Ernest Hemingway published by Scribner's on October 14, 1938. It contains Hemingway's only full-length play, The Fifth Column; all the stories from the earlier collections Three Stories and Ten Poems, In Our Time, Men Without Women and Winner Take Nothing; and four previously uncollected stories.

The first British edition (Jonathan Cape, June 1939) followed the U.S. format, but in September 1944 Cape reissued the stories alone as The First Forty-Nine Stories, without The Fifth Column, and with a reworked preface by Hemingway. This became the standard version in the UK and its publishing territories.

== Contents ==
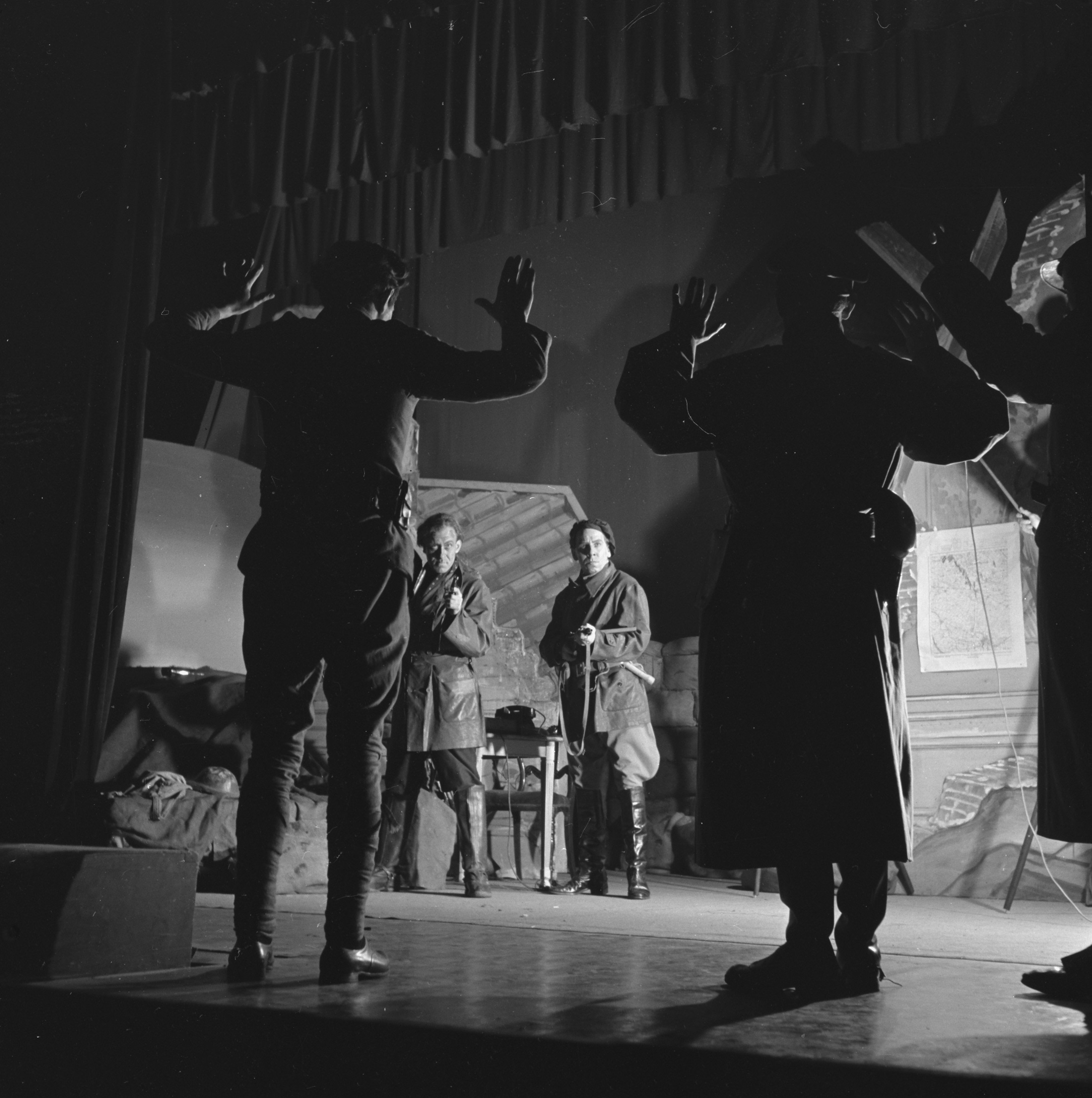
Scene from a 1945 production of The Fifth Column presented by the Dutch theatre company Toneelgroep Comedia

The Fifth Column is set during the Spanish Civil War. Its main character, Philip Rawlings, is an American-born secret agent for the Second Spanish Republic. The play was poorly received upon publication and has been overshadowed by many of the short stories in the anthology.

The play was slated for production in 1938, but setbacks with the Broadway producers delayed production. In 1940, a version of the play was produced on Broadway by the Theater Guild. This production was heavily edited by Benjamin Glazer with significant revisions to the script. Hemingway disliked these changes and attempted to have his name removed from the production. This production ran for 87 performances. The play wasn't professionally produced with Hemingway's original script until 2008 when Mint Theater Company staged the play.

The book includes Hemingway's previously collected stories, starting with the early "Up in Michigan" (1921), along with his most recent magazine stories, collected here for the first time: "The Short Happy Life of Francis Macomber", "The Snows of Kilimanjaro", "The Capital of the World" and "Old Man at the Bridge".

=== Recent stories (1936–1938) ===
1. "The Short Happy Life of Francis Macomber"
2. "The Capital of the World"
3. "The Snows of Kilimanjaro"
4. "Old Man at the Bridge"

=== Three Stories and Ten Poems (1923) ===
5. "Up in Michigan"
  The other two stories appear under In Our Time.

=== In Our Time (1925) ===
6. "On the Quai at Smyrna"
  Added to the 1930 edition.
7. "Indian Camp"
8. "The Doctor and the Doctor's Wife"
9. "The End of Something"
10. "The Three-Day Blow"
11. "The Battler"
12. "A Very Short Story"
13. "Soldier's Home"
14. "The Revolutionist"
15. "Mr. and Mrs. Elliot"
16. "Cat in the Rain"
17. "Out of Season"
  Previously collected in Three Stories and Ten Poems.
18. "Cross-Country Snow"
19. "My Old Man"
  Previously collected in Three Stories and Ten Poems.
20. "Big Two-Hearted River", Part I
21. "Big Two-Hearted River", Part II

=== Men Without Women (1927) ===
22. "The Undefeated"
23. "In Another Country"
24. "Hills Like White Elephants"
25. "The Killers"
26. "Che Ti Dice La Patria?"
27. "Fifty Grand"
28. "A Simple Enquiry"
29. "Ten Indians"
30. "A Canary for One"
31. "An Alpine Idyll"
32. "A Pursuit Race"
33. "Today is Friday"
34. "Banal Story"
35. "Now I Lay Me"

=== Winner Take Nothing (1933) ===
36. "After the Storm"
37. "A Clean, Well-Lighted Place"
38. "The Light of the World"
39. "God Rest You Merry, Gentlemen"
40. "The Sea Change"
41. "A Way You'll Never Be"
42. "The Mother of a Queen"
43. "One Reader Writes"
44. "Homage to Switzerland"
45. "A Day's Wait"
46. "A Natural History of the Dead"
47. "Wine of Wyoming"
48. "The Gambler, the Nun, and the Radio"
49. "Fathers and Sons"
