= Hemingway's Adventures of a Young Man =

1962 film by Martin Ritt

- Theatrical release poster
- Directed by: Martin Ritt
- Screenplay by: A. E. Hotchner
- Based on: The Nick Adams Stories by Ernest Hemingway
- Produced by: Jerry Wald
- Starring: Richard Beymer
- Cinematography: Lee Garmes
- Edited by: Hugh S. Fowler
- Music by: Franz Waxman
- Production company: Jerry Wald Productions
- Distributed by: 20th Century Fox
- Release date: July 25, 1962
- Running time: 145 minutes
- Country: United States
- Language: English
- Budget: $4.1 million or $3 million

Hemingway's Adventures of a Young Man is a 1962 American adventure drama film directed by Martin Ritt from a screenplay by A. E. Hotchner, based on Ernest Hemingway's semi-autobiographical character Nick Adams. It stars Richard Beymer as Adams, along with an ensemble cast that features Corinne Calvet, James Dunn, Arthur Kennedy, Ricardo Montalbán, Susan Strasberg, Jessica Tandy, Eli Wallach, Juano Hernandez and Paul Newman.

The film was released by 20th Century Fox on July 25, 1962. It was nominated in five categories at the 20th Golden Globes, including Best Motion Picture – Drama and Best Director. It was also nominated for the Crystal Globe at the 1962 Karlovy Vary International Film Festival.

== Plot ==
Nick Adams is a young, restless man in rural Michigan who wants a good life and to see the world. He leaves his domineering mother and noble but weak physician father on a cross country trip. In his ramblings he encounters a punch-drunk boxer, a sympathetic telegrapher, and a burlesque show promoter. Nick applies to be a reporter for a newspaper in New York City, but is told he lacks experience. While working at a catered banquet, he hears a speech by a beautiful woman soliciting volunteer ambulance drivers for the Italian Army in World War I, and impulsively signs up. On arrival, he is assigned a bilingual companion to help him, who cannot believe that Nick would volunteer for such a posting. They experience battlefield horrors, Nick is injured, and falls in love with his nurse, who then falls ill herself and dies at the moment they are taking their bedside wedding vows. Finally returning home to his family, he is stunned to hear that his father had died after worrying about Nick.

== Cast ==
- Richard Beymer as Nick Adams
- Diane Baker as Carolyn
- Corinne Calvet as Contessa
- Fred Clark as Mr. Turner
- Dan Dailey as Billy Campbell
- James Dunn as Telegrapher
- Juano Hernández as Bugs
- Arthur Kennedy as Dr. Adams
- Ricardo Montalbán as Major Padula
- Paul Newman as The Battler
- Susan Strasberg as Rosanna
- Jessica Tandy as Mrs. Adams
- Eli Wallach as John
- Edward Binns as Brakeman
- Philip Bourneuf as City Editor
- Tullio Carminati as Rosanna's Father
- Marc Cavell as Eddy Boulton
- Charles Fredericks as Mayor
- Simon Oakland as Joe Boulton
- Michael J. Pollard as George
- Whit Bissell as Ludstrum
- Lillian Adams as Indian Woman
- Walter Baldwin as Conductor
- Pat Hogan as Billy Tabeshaw
- Baruch Lumet as Morris
- Burt Mustin as Old Soldier
- Sharon Tate as Burlesque Queen
- Alfredo Varelli as Father Ben
- Mel Welles as Italian Sergeant

== Production ==
=== Development ===
A. E. Hotchner had adapted five Nick Adams stories for a program on The Seven Lively Arts called "The World of Nick Adams". Directed by Robert Mulligan it was well received, and admired by Hemingway.

Jerry Wald and Hochtner then approached Hemingway seeking the rights to either Across the River and Into the Trees or the Nick Adams stories. Hemingway did not want to sell rights to his novel and was only keen on selling one Nick Adams story. Hotchner pitched to buy the rights for 10 of the 19 stories. Hemingway agreed provided certain conditions were met, including ensuring that "Nick was a good boy." Five of the stories had already been used in "The World of Nick Adams".

The stories used in th first part of the movie wer "Indian Camp", "The Doctor and the Doctor's Wife", "The End of Something", and "The Three-Day Blow". The stories used in the second part were "The Battler" and "A Pursuit Race" (the second part) and "A Very Short Story". The third and final section of the movie used "In Another Country", "Now I Lay Me", and "A Way You'll Never Be" (Nick in the Italian army). Hemingway had to approve the screenplay during all stages of development. Hotchner later wrote:

The stories are connected only by the fact that Nick appears in all of them; other than that, they are isolated experiences of fear, disillusionment, courage, love, war, and loneliness. Each one is a glistening shaft sticking in the heart of an emotional experience. But to fuse them and embellish them for the screen without disturbing their impact was a particularly difficult assignment.

Hotchner started writing the script in December 1960. The rights were reportedly $300,000.

Hotchner finished the script two weeks before Hemingway died. The working title of the film was Ernest Hemingway's "Young Man".

=== Casting ===
Jerry Wald said he and director Martin Ritt agreed that Richard Beymer was "the young actor I think stands the best chance of being the next Gary Cooper." Filmink later argued "This movie is what really killed Beymer as a film star."

=== Filming ===
Filming started 25 September 1961 in Mellen, Wisconsin and wound up in 22 January in Verona, Italy. Interiors were supposed to be shot at Cinecittà in Rome, but that facility were taken up by the production of Cleopatra (1963), forcing Hemingway's to finish its studio work back in the United States.

Jerry Wald died just before the film was released.

== Reception ==
=== Box office ===
The film was a financial failure. When asked why Martin Ritt later said:

It wasn’t a very good film. That was one of the reasons, probably the most important reason. Again, it was cut up. The various scenes by themselves were quite interesting, one or two of them were very good, but it just didn’t add up... It’s beautiful to look at. That country is incredible. I kept some of that footage, a lot of footage that I shot from a ‘copter. Oh, boy. But the film didn’t really work. It was soft in the middle.

=== Critical response ===
Variety said "Richard Beymer's performance is not up to the challenge" of providing a central focus for the movie.

Filmink wrote the movie "needed a strong centre to draw it all together and Beymer is no way near that. You can see Ritt trying to protect him in scenes by cutting away to other actors. Beymer simply isn’t up to the part. It wasn’t his fault – he never should have been cast.”

=== Awards and nominations ===
Institution	Year	Category	Nominee	Result	Ref.
Golden Globe Awards	1963	Best Motion Picture – Drama		Nominated	
Golden Globe Awards	1963	Best Director	Martin Ritt	Nominated	
Golden Globe Awards	1963	Best Actress in a Motion Picture – Drama	Susan Strasberg	Nominated	
Golden Globe Awards	1963	Best Supporting Actor – Motion Picture	Paul Newman	Nominated	
Golden Globe Awards	1963	Best Supporting Actress – Motion Picture	Jessica Tandy	Nominated	
Karlovy Vary International Film Festival	1962	Crystal Globe	Martin Ritt	Nominated	

== Notes ==
- Hotchner, A. E (2001). "Introduction". Ernest Hemingway's After the storm : the story plus the screenplay and a commentary.
