= The Nick Adams Stories =

1972 volume of short stories by Ernest Hemingway

First edition (published by Scribners)

The Nick Adams Stories is a volume of short stories written by Ernest Hemingway published in 1972, a decade after the author's death. In the volume, all the stories featuring Nick Adams, published in various collections during Hemingway's lifetime, are compiled in a single collection. The Nick Adams Stories includes 24 stories and sketches, eight of which were previously unpublished. Some of Hemingway's earliest work, such as "Indian Camp," as well as some of his best known stories, such as "Big Two-Hearted River," are represented.

== Contents ==
This volume is divided into five sections:

=== The Northern Woods ===
- "Three Shots"
- "Indian Camp"
- "The Doctor and the Doctor's Wife"
- "Ten Indians"
- "The Indians Moved Away"

=== On His Own ===
- "The Light of the World"
- "The Battler"
- "The Killers"
- "The Last Good Country"
- "Crossing the Mississippi"

=== War ===
- "Night Before Landing"
- "'Nick sat against the wall ...'"
- "Now I Lay Me"
- "A Way You'll Never Be"
- "In Another Country"

=== A Soldier Home ===
- "Big Two-Hearted River"
- "The End of Something"
- "The Three-Day Blow"
- "Summer People"

=== Company of Two ===
- "Wedding Day"
- "On Writing"
- "An Alpine Idyll"
- "Cross-Country Snow"
- "Fathers and Sons"

== Background and publication history ==
Like Hemingway's other posthumous work, The Nick Adams Stories may have been reworked and edited in a manner he never intended. One reviewer for The New York Times wrote this about the story "Three Shots", a section Hemingway originally cut from "Indian Camp" – one of his early stories first published in 1925 volume In Our Time:

Alone, "Three Shots" stands as a vignette of a boy's fear, accorded sympathy by his father and impatience by his uncle. As part of the stark and spare "Indian Camp," however, it was clearly excess baggage and, knowing that it was cut out, one can only read it with admiration for the nascent and ruthlessly true artistic impulse that caused its excision.

Other critics have welcomed the publication of additional Nick Adams material that fills in chronological gaps of the autobiographical character's experience, and thus shows much of Hemingway's own life that remained unpublished.
