= On Writing =

On Writing may refer to:

- On Writing: A Memoir of the Craft, a memoir by American author Stephen King
- "On Writing", a story fragment by American writer Ernest Hemingway
- Stein on Writing, advice for writers by American writer Sol Stein
