= The Autobiography of Calvin Coolidge =

1929 autobiography by Calvin Coolidge

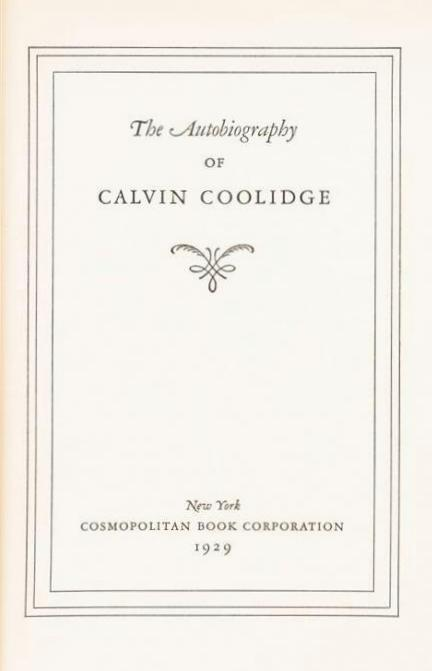
- Title page, first edition
- Author: Calvin Coolidge
- Language: English
- Subject: Autobiography
- Publisher: Cosmopolitan Book Corporation
- Publication date: November 1929 (hardback)
- Publication place: United States
- Pages: 246
- OCLC: 946864
- Text: The Autobiography of Calvin Coolidge at Wikisource

The Autobiography of Calvin Coolidge is an autobiography written by Calvin Coolidge, the 30th president of the United States. Shortly after Coolidge left office, it was serialized in Cosmopolitan magazine in nine parts, from April through December, 1929. It was published as a book in November 1929 by the Cosmopolitan Book Corporation. It was also serialized through newspaper syndication.

Coolidge's autobiography consisted of about 45,000 words, unusually short in comparison to the era's typical "long-winded" biographies and autobiographies. It was praised by Ray Long, editor of Cosmopolitan, for describing the complete story of Coolidge's life and "the complete story of our country during the dramatic years of this generation." Coolidge was one of the first U.S. Presidents to write and publish an autobiography. Coolidge's autobiography covers all the notable moments in his life, such as his childhood and youth, Governorship, Presidency, son's death, and retirement. It was criticized by some for being too obvious and not presenting any new information that was previously unknown to the public. However, this trait of the autobiography was not that surprising as no one expected Coolidge to reveal some private government information and secrets in his autobiography (Coolidge was a very private man, despite his happy-going and cheerful public personality image). However, it was also complimented for its succinctness and relative shortness, considering that most autobiographies of the time were much longer. Coolidge's autobiography, in contrast, was about half the size of a novel. One of the most notable moments in the book was Coolidge's belief that President Warren Harding would recover (in 1923) and then his surprise and inauguration following Harding's death.

The Coolidge autobiography was extremely popular at the time of its publication, as evidenced by the large amount of fan mail that its author received and by the willingness of many newspapers to publish parts of the autobiography so that much more of the American public could buy it and view it. Coolidge said that he hoped that his autobiography might guide and encourage the young men and women of America.

== See also ==
- List of autobiographies by presidents of the United States
