= The Killers (1964 film) =

1964 film by Don Siegel

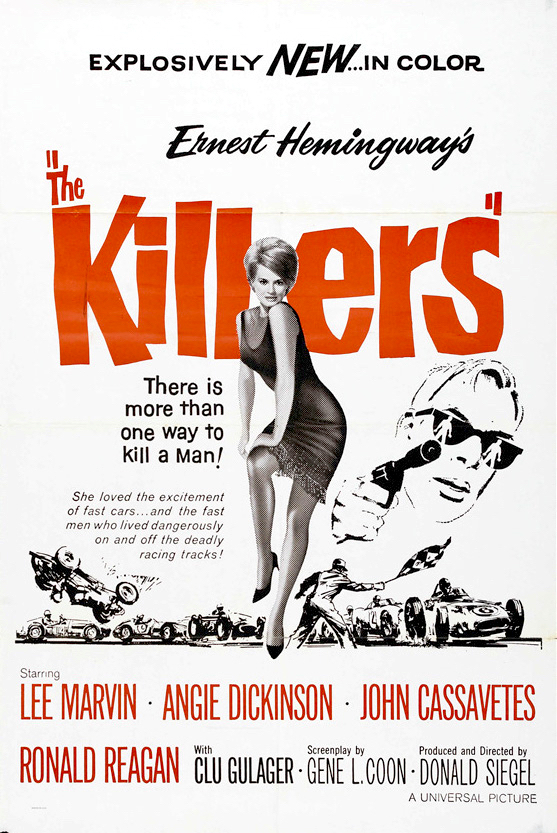
- Theatrical release poster
- Directed by: Don Siegel
- Screenplay by: Gene L. Coon
- Based on: "The Killers" (1927 story) by Ernest Hemingway
- Produced by: Don Siegel
- Starring: Lee Marvin; Angie Dickinson; John Cassavetes; Ronald Reagan; Clu Gulager
- Cinematography: Richard L. Rawlings
- Edited by: Richard Belding
- Music by: John Williams
- Production company: Revue Productions
- Distributed by: Universal Pictures
- Release date: July 17, 1964 (New York City)
- Running time: 95 minutes
- Country: United States
- Language: English

The Killers (also known as Ernest Hemingway's "The Killers") is a 1964 American neo-noir crime film directed and produced by Don Siegel, from a screenplay by Gene L. Coon. It is the second Hollywood adaptation of Ernest Hemingway's 1927 short story, following the 1946 film. It stars Lee Marvin, John Cassavetes, Angie Dickinson, and future president Ronald Reagan in his final film role before formally retiring from acting in 1966 to embark on his political career.

The film was originally produced as a made-for-television film for NBC, but was instead given a theatrical release by Universal Pictures. It premiered on July 17, 1964. Marvin's performance earned him the BAFTA Award for Best Foreign Actor (jointly for his role in Cat Ballou). At the time of release, Marvin said that it was his favorite film.

== Plot ==
Hitmen Charlie Strom and Lee enter a school for the blind and shoot the nonresistant Johnny North (who goes by the name Jerry Nichols) several times, killing him. Charlie is bothered that North refused to flee and notes they were paid an unusually high fee. He and Lee run through what they know about Johnny. He was once a champion race car driver whose career ended in a violent crash. Four years before his death, he was involved in a million-dollar robbery of a mail truck. Tempted by the missing money, Charlie and Lee visit Miami to interview Johnny's former mechanic, Earl Sylvester.

Earl tells them (in a flashback) Johnny was at the top of his profession when he met Sheila Farr. Johnny fell in love and planned to propose marriage but Johnny's career ended with a fiery crash. At the hospital, Earl revealed to Johnny that Sheila was the mistress of mob boss Jack Browning. Enraged, Johnny rebuffed Sheila's attempts to explain and cut his ties to her.

Charlie and Lee approach a former member of Browning's crew Mickey Farmer, who reveals (in a flashback) after the crash, Sheila found Johnny working as a mechanic. She told him Browning was planning the robbery of a U.S. postal truck. On Sheila's recommendation, he agreed to use Johnny as his getaway driver. Johnny forgave Sheila and modified the getaway car. During the meeting with Browning, Mickey, Sheila and another gang member George Fleming, Johnny punched Browning and threatened to kill him after Browning slapped Sheila over a disagreement on whether she should stay. They agreed to "settle this" after the robbery.

Browning and Johnny placed a detour sign to send the mail truck onto an isolated mountain road. When the truck stopped, the gang held it up at gunpoint, loading more than $1 million into the getaway car. Johnny then forced Browning out of the moving car, driving off alone with the money. Mickey also mentioned that George was killed in a bar shootout with the police before Charlie and Lee left him.

Charlie and Lee then pay a visit to Browning, now a real estate developer in Los Angeles. Browning insists he has no idea what happened to the money. He reveals that Sheila is staying at a hotel and arranges a meeting with her. To avoid an ambush, Charlie and Lee go to the hotel hours earlier than agreed, but a clerk spots them and calls Browning. At first, Sheila denies all knowledge of Johnny or the money. Charlie and Lee beat her and dangle her out the window. Terrified, she tells them the truth (in a flashback).

The night before the robbery, Sheila told Johnny that Browning was planning to kill him and pocket his share. Johnny wanted to kill Browning on the spot. Sheila insisted she had a better idea. On her advice, Johnny threw Browning out of the car and drove the money to Sheila, who double-crosses Johnny. As they entered a motel room, Browning was waiting. He shot Johnny, severely wounding him, before Johnny escaped. Fearing Johnny would seek revenge, Browning hired Charlie and Lee to murder him.

Browning is waiting in a window of another building in front of hotel with a sniper rifle. He kills Lee and wounds Charlie. Browning and Sheila return home, where they prepare to flee with the money. Charlie shows up and shoots Browning dead. He shoots and kills Sheila and staggers out the door with the money and drops his gun. Charlie falls dead on the lawn while spilling the money out of the suitcase as the police arrive.

== Cast ==
- Lee Marvin as Charlie Strom, a professional killer
- Angie Dickinson as Sheila Farr, Johnny's two-timing lover
- John Cassavetes as Johnny North, the man Charlie and Lee are hired to kill
- Ronald Reagan as Jack Browning, a gangster, posing as a legitimate businessman
- Clu Gulager as Lee, a professional killer, Charlie's accomplice
- Claude Akins as Earl Sylvester, mechanic and best friend to Johnny
- Norman Fell as Mickey Farmer, gang member and associate of Browning
- Virginia Christine as Miss Watson, the blind secretary
- Don Haggerty as Mail Truck Driver
- Robert Phillips as George Fleming, gang member and associate of Browning
- Kathleen O'Malley as Miss Leslie, the receptionist
- Burt Mustin as Elderly Man

== Production ==
The Killers was intended to be one of the early made-for-TV movies as part of a Project 120 series of films that did not reach the airwaves. It was filmed under the title Johnny North, but NBC regarded it as too violent and sexual for broadcast; Universal released the film theatrically instead.

Steve McQueen and George Peppard were considered for the role of Johnny North that eventually went to John Cassavetes. After Cassavetes was signed to play the racecar driver Johnny, director Don Siegel found out the actor could barely drive.

Siegel was considered to direct the 1946 version but was passed over for the film. The Killers was Ronald Reagan's last acting role in motion pictures before entering politics and the only villainous role in his career. Reportedly, Reagan later stated his regret in doing the movie.

The main title and closing music, originally composed by Henry Mancini for the Orson Welles film Touch of Evil (1958), was drawn from the Universal Pictures music library and re-edited for use in this film. The song "Too Little Time", composed by Mancini with lyrics by Don Raye as the love theme for The Glenn Miller Story, was sung by Nancy Wilson.

A special role in the film is dedicated to a Shelby Cobra CSX2005. One of the earliest of the iconic American sportscars built by Carroll Shelby, it has one of the longest screentimes of any Hollywood movie. The car was later used in the School of Performance Driving and was driven by many Hollywood celebrities, and is today known as the "Trainer Cobra".

== Reception ==
=== Critical response ===
Film critic J. Hoberman writing in The New York Times regarded Siegel's The Killers as a "more vivid, streamlined and callous” adaption of the Hemingway short story than director Robert Siodmak's 1946 version. Hoberman wrote:

The cast is first-rate. Thanks to Marvin’s sleek, snub-nosed menace and the edgy thrill-seeking projected by Angie Dickinson’s classy moll, the movie exudes a cynical Rat Pack cool…The shock opener has the two relentless hit men (Lee Marvin and Clu Gulager, in matching shades and sharkskin suits) hunting their prey (John Cassavetes) in a school for the blind; their mission is accomplished amid a crowd of witnesses, none of whom can see.

The Killers holds a rating of 80% on review aggregator Rotten Tomatoes based on 25 reviews with a 7.2/10 average. The consensus reads: "Though it can't best Robert Siodmak's classic 1946 version, Don Siegel's take on the Ernest Hemingway story stakes out its own violent territory, and offers a terrifically tough turn from Lee Marvin."

In July 2018, it was selected to be screened in the Venice Classics section at the 75th Venice International Film Festival.

=== Awards and nominations ===
Marvin received the 1965 BAFTA Award for Best Actor for this role as well as for his role in Cat Ballou at the 19th British Academy Film Awards.

== Themes ==
“The Killers elaborates in detail ideas which were present in less developed form in Siegel’s earlier movies. It is deeply pessimistic: everyone is compromised either through their associations, occupations or their pasts.” - Biographer Judith M. Kass in Don Seigel: The Hollywood Professions, Volume 4 (1975)

Film critic Judith M. Kass explains the ironic significance of the opening setting for The Killers—a school for the blind:

The sightless students provide a clue to the film’s symbolic stance: that none of the protagonists are able to "see" the situation they are in nor the fateful course ahead of them. And each is movivated by self-interest, so there is no possibility of co-operation between them.

Kass, commenting on the mass liquidation that marks the film's climax writes: "In every case, sticking together or relying on one another might have changed the outcome for each."

== See also ==
- The Killers (1946 film)
- The Killers (1956 film)
