= Big Two-Hearted River =

Short story by Ernest Hemingway

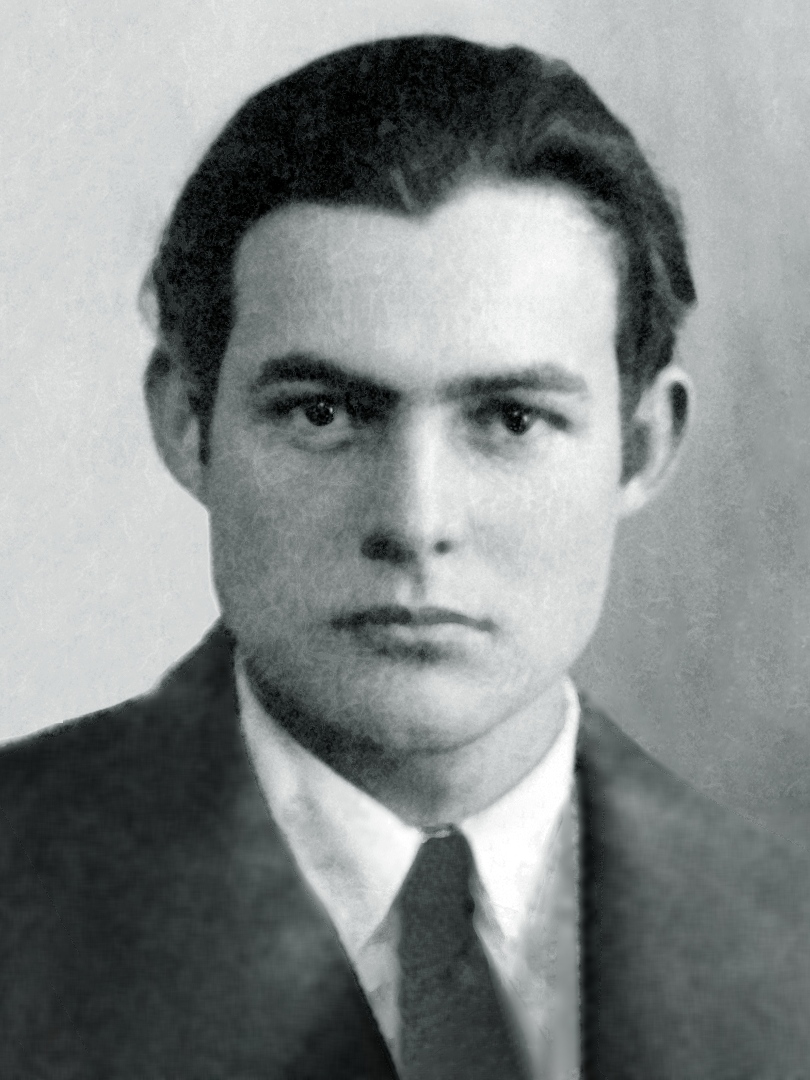
Ernest Hemingway in 1923, two years before the publication of "Big Two-Hearted River"

"Big Two-Hearted River" is a two-part short story written by the American author Ernest Hemingway, published in the 1925 Boni & Liveright edition of In Our Time, the first American volume of Hemingway's short stories. It features a single protagonist, Hemingway's recurrent autobiographical character Nick Adams, whose speaking voice is heard just three times. The story explores the destructive qualities of war which is countered by the healing and regenerative powers of nature. When it was published, critics praised Hemingway's sparse writing style and it became an important work in his canon.

The story is one of Hemingway's earliest pieces to employ his iceberg theory of writing; a modernist approach to prose in which the underlying meaning is hinted at, rather than explicitly stated. "Big Two-Hearted River" is almost exclusively descriptive and intentionally devoid of plot. Hemingway was influenced by the visual innovations of Paul Cézanne's paintings and adapted the painter's idea of presenting background minutiae in lower focus than the main image. In this story, the small details of a fishing trip are explored in great depth, while the landscape setting, and most obviously the swamp, are given cursory attention.

== Background and publication ==
In 1922, Hemingway moved with his wife Hadley to Paris, where he worked as foreign correspondent for the Toronto Star. He became friends with and was influenced by modernist writers such as F. Scott Fitzgerald, Ford Madox Ford, James Joyce, Ezra Pound and Gertrude Stein. The year 1923 saw his first published work, a slim volume titled Three Stories and Ten Poems, followed the next year by another collection of short vignettes, in our time (without capitals). Hoping to have in our time published in New York, in 1924 he began writing stories to add to the volume with "Big Two-Hearted River" planned as the final piece. He started writing the story in May of that year but did not finish until September as he spent the summer helping Ezra Pound and Ford Madox Ford launch the journal the transatlantic review.

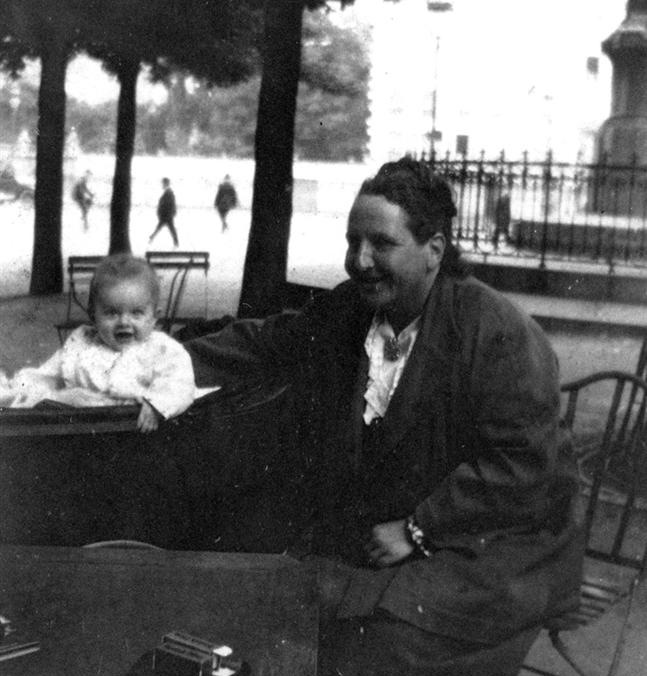
Gertrude Stein photographed with Hemingway's son Jack at La Closerie Des Lilas in 1924. Stein advised Hemingway to shorten the ending of "Big Two-Hearted River".

"Big Two-Hearted River" has strong autobiographical elements. During World War I, Hemingway signed on as a member of the Red Cross at age 19, and was sent to the Italian Front at Fossalta as an ambulance driver. On his first day there, he helped to retrieve the remains of female workers killed in a munitions factory explosion, about which he later wrote in Death in the Afternoon: "I remember that after we searched quite thoroughly for the complete dead we collected fragments". A few days later, on July 8, 1918, he was severely wounded when a mortar bomb exploded between his legs. He was sent to a hospital in Milan where he recuperated for six months; after his return home, he went on a week-long fishing and camping trip in September 1919 with two high school friends to the backcountry near Seney in Michigan's Upper Peninsula—a trip that became the inspiration for "Big Two-Hearted River". The manuscript shows the use of plural pronouns, suggesting that in an early version more characters were included, but by publication any mention of his friends or the townspeople had been removed—leaving Nick alone in the woods.

Hemingway gave the draft to Stein to read in October 1925; she advised cutting the 11-page section of stream-of-consciousness reminiscences written from Nick's point of view. Hemingway took her advice, reworked the ending, and wrote to his editor: "I have discovered that the last eleven pages of the last story in the book are crap". Biographer James Mellow writes that at this early stage in his career Hemingway had not developed his talent enough to fully and capably integrate self-reflections in his writing; Mellow also believes the deleted passage might have been a "tour-de-force" had it been written at a more mature period in Hemingway's development.

In January 1925, while wintering in Schruns, Austria, waiting for a response from query letters written to friends and publishers in America, Hemingway submitted the story to be published in his friend Ernest Walsh's newly established literary magazine This Quarter. Walsh bought it for 1,000 French francs, the highest payment Hemingway had yet received for a piece of fiction. On October 5, 1925, the expanded edition of In Our Time (with conventional capitalization in the title) was published by Boni & Liveright in New York. The last story in the volume was the two-part "Big Two-Hearted River". The piece was later included in Hemingway's collection The Fifth Column and the First Forty-Nine Stories published in October 1938, and in two collections of short stories published after his death, The Nick Adams Stories (1972) and The Complete Short Stories of Ernest Hemingway: The Finca Vigía Edition (1987). The fragment Hemingway cut was published posthumously as a separate short story titled "On Writing" in 1972 in The Nick Adams Stories.

== Plot ==
Part one

Nick was happy as he crawled inside his tent .... It had been a hard trip. He was very tired .... He had made his camp. He was settled. Nothing could touch him. It was a good place to camp.

— Ernest Hemingway, "Big Two-Hearted River"

The story opens with Nick arriving by train at Seney, Michigan, to find that a fire has devastated the town, leaving "nothing but the rails and the burned-over country." While following a road leading away from the town, he stops on a bridge where he observes trout in the river below. After, he hikes up a hill and rests at a burned stump. While smoking a cigarette, he discovers an ash-blackened grasshopper crawling on his sock, and detaches it. His first spoken words in the story are "Go on, hopper .... Fly away somewhere."

Later in the day he relaxes in a glade of tall pines and falls asleep. When he wakes, he hikes the last mile to the edge of the river where he sees the trout feeding in the evening light "making circles all down the surface of the water as though it were starting to rain." He pitches his tent, unpacks his supplies, cooks his dinner, fills his water bucket, heats a pot of coffee, and kills a mosquito before falling asleep.

Part two

Early the next morning, Nick fills a jar with 50 dew-heavy grasshoppers found under a log he names a "grasshopper lodging-house", eats breakfast, drinks sweetened coffee and makes a sliced onion sandwich. After checking and assembling his fly fishing rod and tying on damp leader line, he walks to the river with a net hanging from his belt, a sack over his shoulder and the jar of grasshoppers dangling around his neck. Wading in the water, he fishes the shallows; he lands a trout that "was mottled with clear, water-over-gravel color" that he releases. Moving into a pool of deeper water, he hooks a large trout, "as broad as a salmon", which he loses. After a rest, he moves away from the pool to the more shallow center of the river and catches two trout that he stows in his sack. Sitting on a log, smoking a cigarette and eating his onion sandwich, he thinks about fishing the deep water of the swamp, but decides to wait for another day. At the log in the river, he kills, guts and cleans the two trout before returning to camp.

== Themes ==
=== War ===
Hemingway saw World War I as the "central fact of our time". "Big Two-Hearted River" hints at both widespread physical devastation and Nick's personal war and post-war experience, but neither of these central facts are directly mentioned. Hemingway scholar Joseph Flora makes the observation that Hemingway portrays Nick's character coping "more meaningfully than he had ever done before, with the issues of life and death". Biographer Phillip Young sees the story as basically concerned with a description of a young man "trying desperately to keep from going out of his mind." Nick returns wounded, and introduces a character type Hemingway used again in his later stories and novels. The theme of an unspecified wound is introduced, a device that was to culminate in Jake Barnes' character in The Sun Also Rises. Hemingway scholar William Adair suggests that Nick's war experience was different, and perhaps more traumatic than Hemingway's own, writing that Nick's unspecified wound should not be confused or automatically identified with Hemingway's wound.

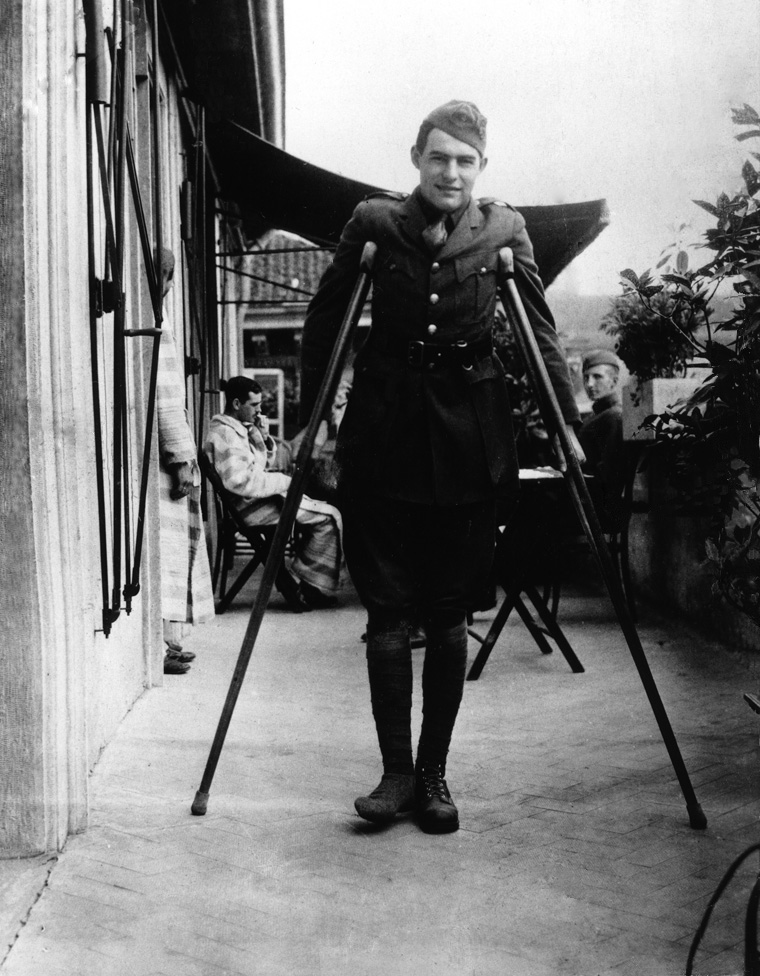
Ernest Hemingway in Milan, 1918. The 19-year-old author is recovering from WWI shrapnel wounds.

Although Hemingway's best fiction such as "Big Two-Hearted River" perhaps originated from the "dark thoughts" about the wounding, Jackson Benson believes that autobiographical details are employed as framing devices to make observations on life in general and not just Nick's own experiences. He writes that Hemingway created "what if" scenarios from real situations in his early fiction, which he projected onto a fictional character—"What if I were wounded and made crazy?" the character asks himself. Benson goes on to write that "much of Hemingway's fiction is dream-like—his early fiction, his best, has often been compared to a compulsive nightmare, as in the recurring imagery of In Our Time."

Adair views the river setting as a fictional representation of the Piave River near Fossalta, the site of Hemingway's mortar wound. Hemingway may have taken the idea of the swamp from the terrain in the battle of Portogrande—a battle that Hemingway wrote about in a 1922 newspaper story, saying of it: "Austrians and Italians attacked and counter-attacked waist deep in swamp water". Furthermore, Adair suggests that Hemingway's own wounding is reflected in the scene where Nick loses a fish—the "biggest one I ever had"—with descriptive imagery such as shoes "squelchy" with water, suggestive of Hemingway's recollection of "feeling as if his boots were filled with warm water (blood) after his wounding."

Writing in A Moveable Feast, Hemingway remembered "Big Two-Hearted River", recalling when he "sat in a corner with the afternoon light coming in over my shoulder and wrote in the notebook .... When I stopped writing I did not want to leave the river where I could see the trout in the pool, its surface pushing and swelling smooth against the resistance of the log-driven piles of the bridge. The story was about coming back from the war but there was no mention of the war in it."

=== Nature ===
Hemingway's stories typically position nature as a source of refuge and rebirth. His characters are often shown retreating to the country in search of regeneration. Nature acts as the setting for hunters' or fishermen's existential moment of transcendence—especially at the moment when prey is killed. In Big Two-Hearted River, Nick walks away from a ruined town, and enters the woods to hike toward the river, unharmed by the fire. His journey is motivated by absolution; the river is described as two-hearted because it gives life in the form of food (fish) and offers redemption. In the woods, Nick stops in a grove of trees that is described as chapel-like, a description that echoes Stephen Crane's The Red Badge of Courage in which Henry Fleming flees to a chapel-like grove of trees. In the grove Nick sleeps well for the first time since the war, and there he begins the healing process. The next morning he goes to the river, wading into the water to fish. At first the strength of the current frightens him, and for some moments he has difficulty controlling himself.

The meadow was wet with dew and Nick wanted to catch grasshoppers for bait before the sun dried the grass. He found plenty of good grasshoppers .... They were cold and wet with the dew and could not jump until the sun warmed them. Nick picked them up, taking only the medium sized brown ones, and put them into the bottle.

— Ernest Hemingway, "Big Two-Hearted River"

Hemingway's descriptions of the Michigan landscape, which would have been familiar to him as in his youth he summered at the family's Walloon Lake cottage in Northern Michigan, are presented in a vague and dreamlike manner. Ronald Berman sees Hemingway's treatment of landscape as like a painter's canvas on which he presents Nick's state of mind. The descriptions of the river's water have been compared to American transcendentalist writer Henry David Thoreau's descriptions of the pond in Walden. Biographer Meyers sees the story as a blend of American primitivism and sophistication; Nick evidences a sense of loss which is "not simply grace under pressure—but under siege". Nature is perceived as good and civilization as bad—a pervasive theme in American literature, found in such American classics as Mark Twain's 19th-century Huckleberry Finn and in William Faulkner's 20th-century Go Down, Moses.

According to Hemingway scholar Susan Beegel, Hemingway is fundamentally an American nature writer. She attributes it to his upbringing: his mother, Grace Hemingway, believed avidly in the early 20th-century "back to nature" movement, and his father was a physician who taught science to his son, taking him to Agassiz Movement meetings as a young boy. Hemingway's affinity with nature is reflected most strongly in "Big Two-Hearted River", in broad strokes whereby he has Nick traveling deep into the American back-country to find solace, and in small details such as his Agassiz "object oriented" descriptions of the grasshoppers.

== Style ==
=== Iceberg theory ===
Hemingway was inspired by Ezra Pound's writings and applied the principles of imagism to his own work. Pound's influence can be seen in the stripped-down, minimalist style characteristic in Hemingway's early fiction. Betraying his admiration for the older writer, he admitted that Pound "taught [me] more about how to write and how not to write than any son of a bitch alive". He also learned from James Joyce, who further instilled the idea of stripped down economic prose. Hemingway's short stories from the 1920s adhere to Pound's tight definition of imagism; biographer Carlos Baker writes that in his short stories Hemingway tried to learn how to "get the most from the least, [to] prune language, [to] multiply intensities, [to] tell nothing but the truth in a way that allowed for telling more than the truth". Hemingway adapted this style into a technique he called his iceberg theory: as Baker describes it, the hard facts float above water while the supporting structure, including the symbolism, operates out of sight.

If a writer of prose knows enough of what he is writing about he may omit things that he knows and the reader, if the writer is writing truly enough, will have a feeling of those things as strongly as though the writer had stated them. The dignity of movement of an ice-berg is due to only one-eighth of it being above water. A writer who omits things because he does not know them only makes hollow places in his writing.

— Ernest Hemingway in Death in the Afternoon

The iceberg theory has been termed the "theory of omission". Hemingway believed a writer could convey an object or concept while writing about something entirely different. In "Big Two-Hearted River" he elaborates on the mundane activities Nick carries out. The story is filled with seemingly trivial detail: Nick gathers grasshoppers, brews coffee, catches and loses a large trout. In this climactic event, however, the excitement and tension becomes so strong that Nick betrays his inner thoughts and he takes a break.

While Hemingway painstakingly describes seemingly extraneous minutiae from Nick's fishing trip, he avoids or barely hints at the driving force of the work: the emotional turmoil wrought on Nick by his return home from a catastrophic war. Hemingway has said he believes this avoidance made the heart and thrust of the story all the more acute, writing "'Big Two-Hearted River' is about a boy beat to the wide coming home from the war .... beat to the wide was an earlier and possibly more severe form of beat, since those who had been were unable to comment on this condition and could not suffer that it be mentioned in their presence. So the war, all mention of the war, anything about the war is omitted." Flora believes that in "Big Two-Hearted River" the concept of the iceberg theory is more evident than in any other piece written by Hemingway.

Paul Smith believes Hemingway was still only experimenting stylistically during In Our Time. He maintains that Hemingway's later minimalist style can be seen here, but not so much from tight editing as from Hemingway's first approach, his desire to emulate his influences. Hemingway's sentences "began life as scrawny little things, and then grew to their proper size through a process of accretion." He avoided complicated syntax to reflect Nick's wish that the fishing trip be uncomplicated. An analysis of the text shows that about 70 percent of the sentences are simple sentences—a childlike syntax without subordination—and that repetition is often substituted for subordinate thoughts. Furthermore, the repetition creates prose with a "rhythmic, ritualistic effect" that emphasizes important points. The lengths of the paragraphs vary with short paragraphs intensifying the action. Benson writes that in "Indian Camp" and "Big Two-Hearted River" Hemingway's prose was sharper and more abstract than in other stories, and that by employing simple sentences and diction—techniques he learned writing for newspapers—the prose is timeless with an almost mythic quality.

=== Cézanne ===
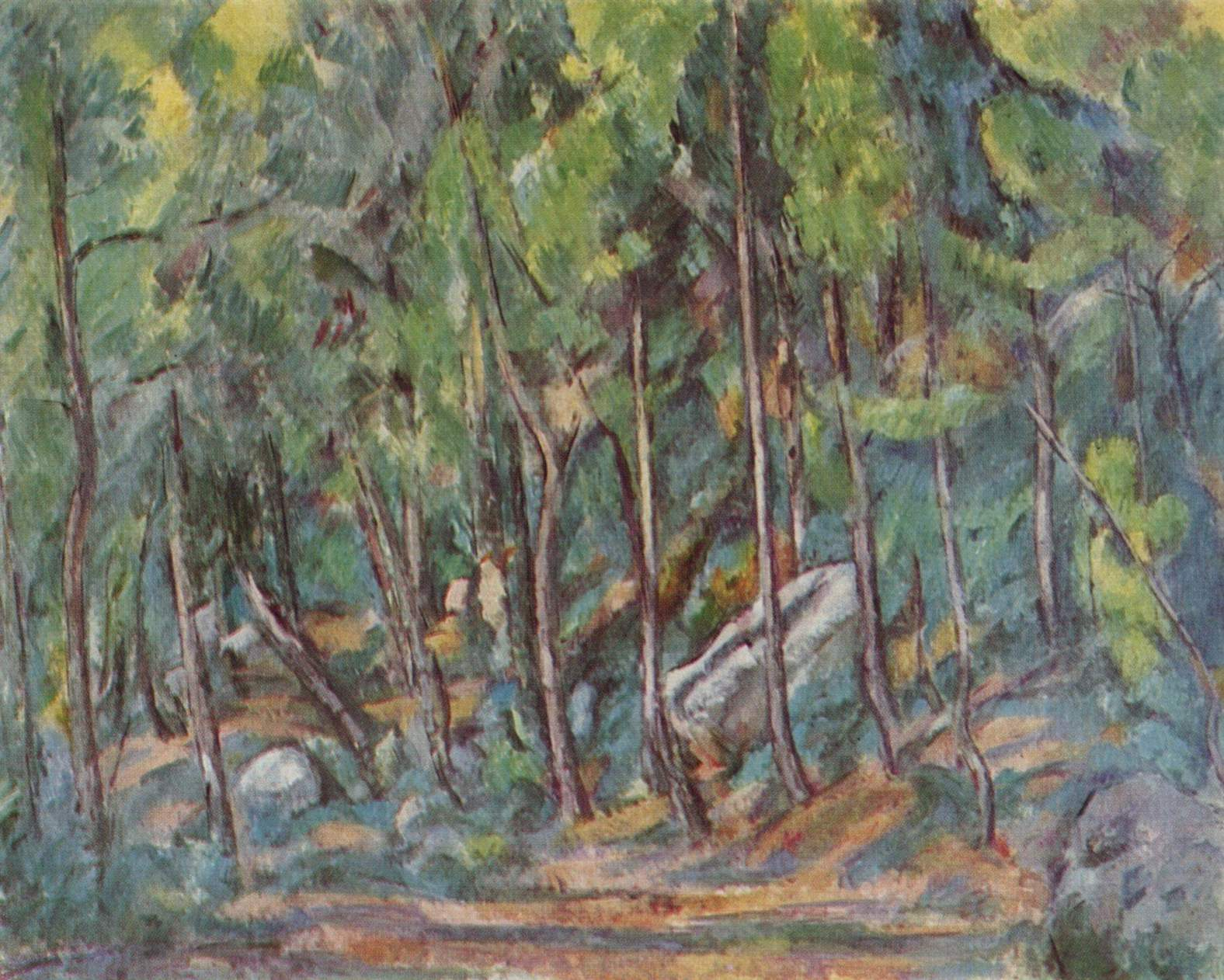
Hemingway said of Paul Cézanne's In the Forest of Fontainebleau that "This is what we try to do in writing, this and this, and woods and the rocks we have to climb over".

Hemingway greatly admired Cézanne and early in his career crafted his prose in a way that would resonate with that painter's work. He said in a 1949 interview that "Cézanne is my painter after the early painters .... I can make a landscape like Mr. Paul Cézanne, I learned how ... by walking through the Luxembourg Museum a thousand times." Hemingway wanted the structure of "Big Two-Hearted River" to resemble a Cézanne—with a detailed foreground set against a vaguely described background. In a letter to Stein from August 1924, he wrote, "I have finished two long stories ... and finished the long one I worked on before I went to Spain where I am doing the country like Cézanne and having a hell of a time and sometimes getting it a little bit. It is about 100 pages long and nothing happens and the country is swell. I made it all up".

His description of the river and the countryside betray the influence of the Post-Impressionist style. Hemingway was heavily influenced by the modernists. He often visited the Musée du Luxembourg, where he saw three Cézanne paintings, L'Estaque, Cour d'une ferme, and Les Peupliers. A series of Cézanne watercolors were exhibited at Berheim-Jeune Gallery before he began writing the story. Hemingway wrote in A Moveable Feast that he had been "learning something from the painting of Cézanne that made writing simple true sentences far from enough to make the stories have the dimensions that I was trying to put in them."

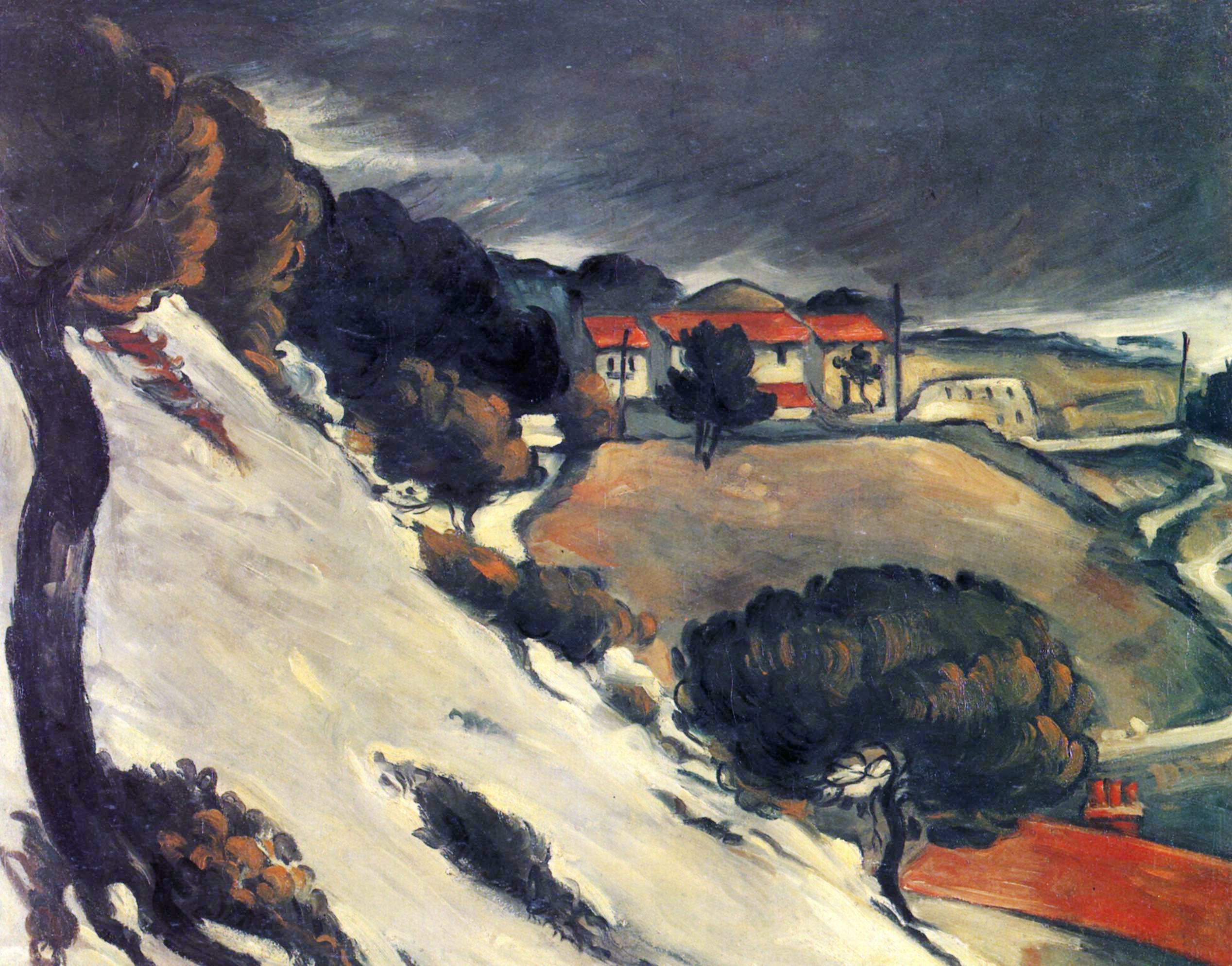
L'Estaque, Melting Snow, Cézanne, c. 1871

Comparing "Big Two-Hearted River" to Cézanne's paintings, Berman observes that Hemingway established a "representation of form, space and light", and that the dense descriptive passages give "light and form .... overwhelmingly visual, intensely concerned with spatiality", while in the middle ground, "We sense [the trees] through vertical forms and dark colors only". Like Cézanne paintings, Hemingway's landscapes are vague and do not represent any specific place: Seney burned in 1891, not in 1919; the hill Nick climbs does not exist; and the east branch of the Fox River, where he camps, is not a day's hike from the town.

Kenneth Johnston believes Hemingway's use of symbolism is a substitute for paint and brushstrokes. He views the description of the town after the fire, and the railroad tracks, as words "slash[ed] across the landscape", with a physicality similar to a Cézanne landscape. The minutely detailed passages of the campsite and Nick's mundane activities fill the story's foreground, while the forest and menacing swamp, relegated to the background, are described vaguely and only in passing. The river acts as a barrier between the foreground and background, and is present as deep in places, shallow in others, with currents that are either slow or fast. Berman says Nick is shown as a figure in a painting—seen in the foreground at the campsite and at a distance from the murky background of the swamp.

=== Symbolism ===
Nick is incapable of self-reflection and unable to cope with pain. Hemingway conveys this through symbolism and a series of objective correlatives (tangible objects), which allow the reader insight to the character's motivations. For example, on his arrival in Seney he literally falls off the train, shocked at the sight of the burned town, but on a deeper level in shock from his war experience. Leaving behind the burnt landscape, Nick climbs a hill in the heat, and surveys the town's damage. The burning and heat symbolize his memory of war-torn Italy, but he hopes for regrowth: "It could not all be burned. He knew that". At the top of the hill, he takes a break, smokes a cigarette, and speaks for the first time. Flora suggests that speaking symbolizes his humanity, lost in the war, which he is beginning to regain.

In the swamp the banks were bare, the big cedars came together overhead, the sun did not come through, except in patches; in the fast deep water in the half light, the fishing would be tragic ... Nick did not want it.

— Ernest Hemingway, "Big Two-Hearted River"

Beyond the town the bridge over the river still exists and the river symbolizes time and timelessness, healing and the natural cycle of life and death. Nick is on a journey, perhaps he sees it as a religious quest given the Christian symbolism of the fish. From the town, a road leads into pristine back-country. It crosses a bridge under which the trout hold steady against the current, just as Nick needs to hold steady. From the bridge he glimpses a kingfisher taking wing, a bird Johnston points out symbolizes "halcyon days, peace and tranquility". A large uprooted tree symbolizes the protagonist himself uprooted by war, and that his fragility is symbolized by the trout he releases carefully so as not to damage its protective slime coat. The campsite symbolizes safety, set deep in a pine grove and described in soothing greens; beyond three dead trees in the background looms the swamp where he will not venture.

His tent is portrayed as a less dark place than the emptiness outside, and becomes a place of safety and sanctuary. Conversely, the swamp is described in themes that convey it as shrouded in mist at night, and a place Nick deliberately tries not to think about. When he wakes in the morning, regenerated by sleep, he feels stronger and the swamp seems less threatening.

== Reception ==
In Our Time was published as part of Pound's modernist series by Three Mountains Press, Paris in 1924. The work was well received by critics; Edmund Wilson described the writing as "of the first distinction", and in the 1940s he again wrote of "Big Two-Hearted River", "along with the mottled trout ... the boy from the American Middle West fishes up a nice little masterpiece." When the story was published in the United States, critics asserted Hemingway had reinvigorated the short story by his use of declarative sentences and his crisp style. In 1952, reviewing The Old Man and the Sea—for which Hemingway would win the Pulitzer Prize and the Nobel Prize in Literature—The New York Times said of "Big Two-Hearted River" that it was one of the "best and happiest of his early short stories".

Carlos Baker views the stories of In Our Time as a remarkable achievement for a young writer. Joseph Flora described "Big Two-Hearted River" as "unquestionably the most brilliant of the collection In Our Time". The piece has become one of Hemingway's most anthologized stories, and one of a handful subject to serious literary criticism since its publication, and belongs in the canon of 20th-century American literature. Beegel writes that it is considered "among the best" American short stories, along with Stephen Crane's "The Open Boat", Nathaniel Hawthorne's "Young Goodman Brown" and Edgar Allan Poe's "The Fall of the House of Usher".

According to Benson, despite Pound and Joyce's influence, Hemingway "carried the new form into the position of dominant influence" for much of the 20th century. Unlike other modernist writers, who wrote of man cut off from the past, Hemingway placed his narratives in the present and hence became "the true modernist".
