= Nick Adams (character) =

Fictional character by Ernest Hemingway

Nicholas Adams is a fictional character, the protagonist of two dozen short stories and vignettes written in the 1920s and 1930s by American author Ernest Hemingway. Adams is partly inspired by Hemingway's own experiences, from his summers in Northern Michigan at his family cottage to his service in the Red Cross ambulance corps in World War I. The first of Hemingway's stories to feature Nick Adams was published in his 1925 collection In Our Time, with Adams appearing as a young child in "Indian Camp", the collection's first story.

All Nick Adams stories were later collected in a 1972 book, published after Hemingway's death, titled The Nick Adams Stories. They are, for the most part, stories of initiation and adolescence. Taken as a whole, as in The Nick Adams Stories, they chronicle a young man's coming of age in a series of linked episodes. The stories are grouped according to major time periods in Nick's life.

== The Nick Adams Stories ==
=== The Northern Woods ===
- "Three Shots"
- "Indian Camp"
- "The Doctor and the Doctor's Wife"
- "Ten Indians"
- "The Indians Moved Away"

=== On His Own ===
- "The Light of the World"
- "The Battler"
- "The Killers"
- "The Last Good Country"
- "Crossing the Mississippi"

=== War ===
- "Night Before Battle"
- "'Nick sat against the wall ...'"
- "Now I Lay Me"
- "A Way You'll Never Be"
- "In Another Country"

=== A Soldier Home ===
- "Big Two-Hearted River"
- "The End of Something"
- "The Three-Day Blow"
- "Summer People"

=== Company of Two ===
- "Wedding Day"
- "On Writing"
- "An Alpine Idyll"
- "Cross-Country Snow"
- "Fathers and Sons"

== External links and references ==
- Hemingway, Ernest. The Nick Adams Stories. New York: Charles Scribner's Sons, 1972.
- New York Times review of The Nick Adams Stories
- The Great Michigan Read, a statewide reading program featuring The Nick Adams Stories
