= Ray Long =

American journalist

- Born: March 23, 1878; Lebanon, Indiana, United States of America
- Died: July 9, 1935 (aged 57); Beverly Hills, California, United States of America
- Occupations: Magazine & newspaper editor, film writer
- Known for: Editor-in-chief of Cosmopolitan magazine
- Spouse(s): Several (see 'Personal Life and Family' section)
- Children: Ray Long (1924–1998)

William Ray Long, (March 23, 1878 – July 9, 1935) was an American newspaper, magazine, film, writer, and editor who is notable for being the editor-in-chief of Cosmopolitan magazine between 1919 and 1931. He is said to have had "a colorful career" before he was affected by financial problems and ended up committing suicide.

== Life and career ==
Long was born into poverty in 1878 in Lebanon, Indiana, a small, rural town in the Midwestern United States. He was educated in public schools in Indianapolis, a much larger city and the capital of Indiana. His first job was being a page on the Superior Court in Indianapolis. He later acquired an interest in newspapers and magazines and became a copy boy on the Indianapolis News. He became a reporter at the young age of 22, and later worked for many other newspapers and magazines, such as the Indianapolis Star, Kansas City Post, Cincinnati Post, Cleveland Press, and Hampton's Magazine.

Long was a police reporter for the Cincinnati Post, and he was made the managing editor of this newspaper when he was 20 years old due to a shake-up at this newspaper. He created a staff to help him out, all of whom were 24 years old or younger. This staff included Roy Howard and O. O. McIntyre, among others. Long helped some editors, writers, and reporters advance their careers, such as James Oliver Curwood, Peter B. Kyne, Ring Lardner, Dean Cornwell, Damon Runyon, Royal Brown, and "a lot of "other good [magazine writers]"". Long also worked with many other reporters, including Booth Tarkington, Roy W. Howard, Meredith Nicholson, George Ade, and other reporters from Indiana.

His good writing and editing skills allowed for him to get promoted to better positions. Long was the Chicago manager for the United Press at one point in time, and he was the managing editor of The Red Book in Chicago in 1912, a position that he received due to his good ability to understand people's tastes and likes. Long said that he looked at words and articles by how they sounded ("by ear"), rather than by seeing if they were grammatically correct or full of information and knowledge.

William Randolph Hearst gave Long the position of President and editor-in-chief of the International Magazine Company, Inc. This allowed him to edit the Cosmopolitan magazine, as well as other magazines, such as Good Housekeeping, Harper's Bazaar, Motor, and Motor Boating. His salary and bonuses combined at Cosmopolitan were $180,000 a year, a sum which would be several times higher today due to inflation. He said that his secret to becoming a successful editor "was giving the public the kind of things he himself liked to read." This even caused him initially to reject the publication of Ernest Hemingway's short story, "Fifty Grand", although he later included it in an anthology he edited and published in 1932. Time Magazine considered Long's greatest publication at the time to be The Autobiography of Calvin Coolidge.

A large number of short stories by the writer Somerset Maugham first appeared in Cosmopolitan, Hearst's International and Good Housekeeping. Maugham's connection with the Hearst publications began in 1920 at Ray Long's initiative and continued into the late 1940s.

== Professional decline ==
On October 1, 1931, Long retired from Cosmopolitan and went into the book publishing business, which had been his lifelong ambition.

In 1932 he edited, and published with his publishing partner Richard R. Smith, 20 Best Stories in Ray Long's 20 Years as an Editor, however, this first publishing enterprise with Smith failed, and caused Long to become bankrupt in 1933. His bankruptcy led him to move to some islands in the South Seas near Tahiti, where he lived for a year before moving back to the United States (it has been suggested that his move to the South Seas was inspired by Somerset Maugham's novel The Moon and Sixpence).

In his last several years, he went to Hollywood, California and wrote and edited films for several film corporations, including Columbia Pictures Corporation, Fox Film Corporation, and Metro-Goldwyn-Mayer. He also returned to the magazine business, working for Photoplay, Shadowplay, and Liberty magazines. He was so financially desperate that he had to rely on old friends and acquaintances to get whatever jobs he could.

== Personal life and family ==
Long first married Florence E. Webster, but divorced her in 1910. He married Mrs. Pearl Dillon Schon, a daughter of Washington F. Dillon, in September 1910. She was a writer herself. Finally, in 1922, Long married Lucy Virginia Bovie, who was originally from Gallipolis, Ohio. Their only child, Ray Long, was born two years later. At the time of Long's death, his wife and his son, both of whom outlived Long, resided in Greenwich, Connecticut, whereas Long had been residing in California at the time.

== Suicide ==
Several weeks before his suicide, Long began feeling ill. His maid, Helen Amdt (or Andt), said that on the day before his suicide, he was in a "dark mood all afternoon" and "seemed unusually morose". On Tuesday, July 9, 1935, at the age of 57, in the bedroom of his California home, he apparently attempted suicide by shooting himself in the mouth with a small caliber rifle. The bullet became stuck in his neck and a part of his spinal cord became severed. He was found unconscious and dying by his maid, lying on the bedroom floor and wearing silk pajamas. Long was taken to an emergency hospital during an operation that unsuccessfully attempted to save his life. Long died half an hour after being taken to the hospital.

Regarding Long's death, A.G. Peterson, the Beverly Hills officer who investigated Long's death, stated that "[t]here is no doubt [that] it was a suicide". No suicide note explaining why Long chose to commit suicide was ever found. One of Long's friends speculated that part of the reason why he committed suicide was because he "guessed he had passed his peak" in terms of creative output. This matches with previous statements by some of Long's friends "that the only thing on earth he feared was "going stale". He was cremated and his ashes were put into the Pacific Ocean.

In a bibliographic study of Somerset Maugham, Raymond Toole Stott writes: "Oddly enough, Ray Long lost his life because of his association with Maugham. He was sent the typescript of The Moon and Sixpence and after reading it decided he, too, wanted to paint. He was over 50 but he threw up his job and went to live in one of the islands in the Pacific. He painted for a number of years, then decided he had no aptitude for it, and killed himself."

== Funeral ==
Many of Long's friends, including some prominent writers, attended his funeral, including novelist Rupert Hughes (uncle of famous aviator and philanthropist Howard Hughes), humorist Irvin S. Cobb, and stage actor George Jessel. However, his wife Lucy did not attend his funeral since she said that she was too ill. His funeral service lasted only eight minutes. Rupert Hughes was the individual who was chosen to deliver the eulogy. Hughes said that "[Ray Long had] spent his life putting flowers into the hearts of others", and Long's friends all over the world compensated Long by sending him flowers for his funeral.

== Works ==
=== Books ===
- An Editor Looks at Russia: One Unprejudiced View of the Land of the Soviets (NY: Ray Long & Richard R. Smith, 1931)
- 20 Best Short Stories in Ray Long's 20 Years as an Editor (NY: Crown, 1932)

=== Articles by ===
- "James Oliver Curwood and His Far North," The Bookman, February 1921.
- "I'm Drinking More Than I Ever Did Before–Aren't You?," Hearst's International, August 1924.
- "The Good New Days," American Legion Monthly, December 1926.
- "A Letter to a Young Man with an Urge to Edit a Popular Magazine," The Bookman, January 1927.
- "Bring Him Back Alive," Writer's Digest, August 1932.

=== Articles about ===
- Thornton Lewis, "Ray Long Tells How," Writer's Digest, October 1925.
- Mildred Temple, "Editors You Want To Know," The Author & Journalist, February 1930.
