= A Canary for One =

Short story by Ernest Hemingway

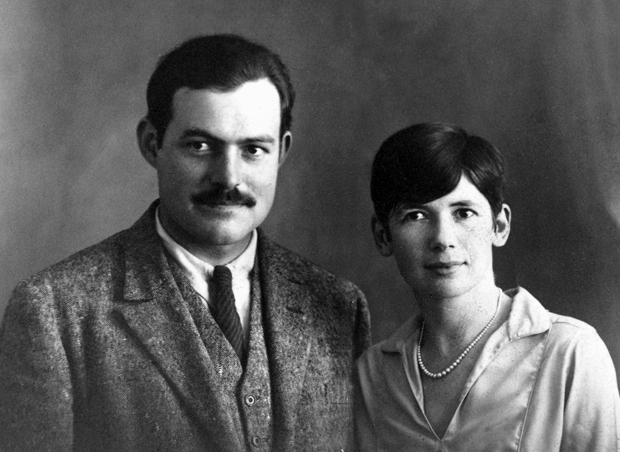
Ernest Hemingway with his second wife in 1927, shortly after divorcing his first

"A Canary for One" is a short story by Ernest Hemingway. It was first published in Scribner's Magazine April 1927. It was republished in Men Without Women (1927), The Fifth Column and the First Forty-Nine Stories (1961) and The Complete Short Stories of Ernest Hemingway (1987).

== Plot ==
Three Americans, a married couple and a middle-aged woman, are traveling on a train from the French riviera through Marseille and Avignon overnight to Paris. The middle-aged woman seems to be partly deaf and anxious about the fast-moving train crashing. She is delighted by a canary she bought in Palermo in Sicily. The train passes a house fire and wrecked vehicles. Halfway through the story, the narrator reveals himself to be the husband, listening in on the woman’s conversation with his wife. After finding out that the couple are American, the woman mentions repeatedly that Americans make the only good husbands. She bought the canary for her still-heartbroken daughter, whom she prevented from marrying a Swiss man in Vevey two years ago. As they exit the train, it is revealed that the American couple will live separately in Paris.

== Development ==
Hemingway began writing the first drafts of "A Canary for One" in September 1926.
