= On Writing (Hemingway) =

Story fragment by Ernest Hemingway

"On Writing" is a story fragment written by Ernest Hemingway which he omitted from the end of his short story, "Big Two-Hearted River", when it was published in 1925 in In Our Time. It was then published after Hemingway's death in the 1972 collection The Nick Adams Stories.

== Plot summary ==
“On Writing” is a deleted ending to "Big Two-Hearted River," an account of Nick Adams' fishing trip in northern Michigan after World War I. When "On Writing" begins, Nick has caught one trout already and observes the river, considering where more fish might lie. Nick credits his knowledge to his friend Bill Smith. This reminds him of another friend, Bill Bird, and their adventures in Europe. His thoughts continue to his old group of friends, his wife Helen, and marriage both to a woman and to fishing, before moving on to memories of bullfighting. Nick then reflects on writing and how it can take reality as inspiration and motivation, but that the stories themselves must be invented. The real reason for writing, Nick realizes, is for the fun of it. He aspires to greatness—wanting to write like Cézanne painted—and believes he knows how Cézanne would paint the river. Inspired, Nick releases his trout and heads back to camp. He stops to remove ticks from a rabbit along the way, but at the end of the story is walking again, "holding something in his head".

== Background and publication history ==
“On Writing” was originally part of “Big Two-Hearted River,” which was then published without it in 1925 as part of Hemingway's short story collection, In Our Time. The cut fragment was titled “On Writing”, and was published after Hemingway's death in The Nick Adams Stories, collected by Philip Young in 1972.

Hemingway was encouraged to cut the fragment now known as “On Writing” by his friend and fellow writer Gertrude Stein, who thought the story slowed when Nick began thinking. Hemingway later wrote, “I have decided that all that mental conversation in the long fishing story is the shit and have cut it all out. ….I’ve finished it off the way it ought to have been all along. Just the straight fishing.”

== Theme and interpretation of writing ==
Nick's thoughts about writing are often attributed to Hemingway himself. Elizabeth Dewberry Vaughn explains how some critics completely substitute Hemingway for Nick. Debra A. Moddelmog writes, “Many critics who discuss this rejected conclusion generally assume that Hemingway lost control of his art here, identified too closely with Nick, and began writing autobiography rather than fiction.” However, she believes that this near-overlap is common in the Nick Adams stories. Nick himself speaks of fiction that sounds real: “That was what the family couldn’t understand. They thought it was all experience.”

This conflict between reality and fiction is addressed by many critics. Lawrence Broer discusses Hemingway's fame as an objective writer, but Nick says in the fragment, “The only writing that was any good was what you made up, what you imagined. That made everything come true.” Vaughn notes the metafictional aspects of “On Writing,” extending them, possibly, to In Our Time.

However, Nick believes that an author can't work “too close to life.” “That was the weakness of Joyce,” he says. “Daedalus in Ulysses was Joyce himself, so he was terrible. Joyce was so damn romantic and intellectual about him.” Because Nick is often seen as at least partially autobiographical, Hemingway may have followed his own teaching in cutting “On Writing.” The fragment highlighted Nick's drawn-out thought process, and that may have been too “intellectual.”

In addition to commenting on Joyce, Nick mentions several other writers that he has learned from, among them Gertrude Stein, E.E. Cummings, and Ezra Pound.

== Symbolism and Allusion ==
Nick's freeing the trout and helping the rabbit indicate his sensitivity as an artist.

Throughout the fragment, Nick alludes to stories from In Our Time. He directly mentions writing “My Old Man,” and his mention of childbirth fits scenes in “Indian Camp” and Chapter 2. He also mentions elements of many other stories, such as the bullfighter Maera from Chapters 13 and 14 and ruining the reality of war by talking about it, as Krebs finds in “Soldier’s Home.” These similarities have led to the belief that Nick is the supposed author of In Our Time. Specifically, when Nick is “holding something in his head” at the end of “On Writing,” many believe it is the story “Big Two-Hearted River.”

== Theory and implications of Nick as author of In Our Time ==
If "On Writing" had been published, our reading of the book would be significantly changed. Recognizing Nick as the author “resolves many confusions about the book’s unity, structure, vision, and significance,” Moddelmog writes —in short, it could be viewed as a novel instead of a short story collection. She believes that this is indeed the correct way to view the book. Following Nick's thoughts gives us a clearer sense of the connectedness of the stories, while separating us from Hemingway's direct narration keeps us from applying too much of Hemingway's biography to a work of fiction.

Our readings of individual stories would also be affected. "Indian Camp", for example, ends with Nick, as a boy, resolving never to die, but as Paul Smith notes, viewing the young Nick through the author Nick's eyes emphasizes that this view of death is false. Our views of the “marriage stories” would also be affected by Nick's description of his own marriage in “On Writing.” Even individual characters would be affected—Maera, the bullfighter killed in Chapter 14 of In Our Time, is still alive in “On Writing”.

== Effects of addition to and deletion from “Big Two-Hearted River” ==
Besides implying that Nick is the author of In Our Time, including “On Writing” in “Big Two-Hearted River” would have changed our views of Nick as a character. Moddelmog notes that we would view him as a hero: after his fear of thinking in “Big Two-Hearted River,” Nick leaves the stream after “On Writing” ready to face his thoughts and even to write about them. “To put this another way,” Moddelmog says, “in the act of writing, Nick will have to fish that symbolic mental swamp, an effort which, in the final version of ‘Big Two-Hearted River,’ he is not quite ready to make.”

Including the fragment would also change the chronology of The Nick Adams Stories by referencing Nick’s marriage, placing it later after the war. However, Nick’s background doesn’t completely depend on “On Writing”—he mentions “the need to write” in “Big Two-Hearted River.” “On Writing” simply expands Nick's story and makes it available to the reader.

Cutting the fragment, as Hemingway did, also has many results. Louis A. Renza explains that retaining “On Writing” would draw attention to the fact that the story was writing, while omitting the piece helps hide it.

Flora believes that cutting “On Writing” allows a greater scope of interpretation than would be encouraged with Nick as a narrator. In addition, viewing In Our Time like a novel would cause continuity problems that would otherwise be avoidable. Nick's war wound changes, for example, which is tolerable across short stories but not through a novel. In addition, Hemingway struggled with writing in novel form; viewing In Our Time as a novel would mean that he struggled after he had already succeeded. Finally, cutting “On Writing” gave Nick greater flexibility as a character. Assigning him authorship to all of In Our Time would force him to take on more and more stories, but without the possession implied in the fragment, Nick was free to appear in any of Hemingway's future stories—but only if he chose.
