= Che Ti Dice La Patria? =

Short story by Ernest Hemingway set in Italy

"Che ti dice la Patria?"
- Short story by Ernest Hemingway
- Original title: Che ti dice la Patria?
- Translator: What does the father-land tell you?
- Country: United States
- Language: English
- Genre: short story

Publication
- Published in: Men Without Women
- Publication type: short story collection
- Publication date: 1927

"Che ti dice la Patria?" is a short story by American author Ernest Hemingway set in Italy. The Italian title may be translated as "What does the homeland tell you?"

== Publication ==
This story was first published in The New Republic (May 18, 1927), under the title "Italy – 1927 ". Under the new title the story was included, later that year, in the collection Men Without Women.

== Plot summary ==
The story is about a journey through Spezia and Genoa, two years after Benito Mussolini became dictator of Italy. The story records a journey marked by "ten days of disappointing weather, unpleasant interactions with the locals, and bad food".

== See also ==
- The Complete Short Stories of Ernest Hemingway
- Ernest Hemingway bibliography
