= Hills Like White Elephants =

Short story by Ernest Hemingway

- Short story by Ernest Hemingway

Text available at Wikisource
- Country: United States
- Language: English
- Genre: Short story

Publication
- Published in: Men Without Women
- Publication type: short story collection
- Publication date: 1927

Chronology
| In Another Country | The Killers |

"Hills Like White Elephants" is a short story by Ernest Hemingway. It was first published in August 1927 in the literary magazine transition, then later that year in the short story collection Men Without Women. In 2002, the story was adapted into a 38-minute short film starring Greg Wise, Emma Griffiths Malin and Benedict Cumberbatch.

== Summary ==
The story focuses mainly on a conversation between an American man and a young woman, described as a "girl", at a Spanish train station while waiting for a train to Madrid. The girl compares the nearby hills to white elephants. The pair indirectly discuss an "operation" that the man wants the girl to have, which is implied to be an abortion, that was taboo to talk about.

== Analysis ==
While there is little context or background information about the characters, several scholars have analyzed how the setting influences the story. The expatriate atmosphere is "a motivating factor in character action," writes Jeffrey Herlihy in In Paris or Paname: Hemingway’s Expatriate Nationalism. Setting the piece in Spain "dramatizes the peripatetic subject" and allows the man to discuss abortion outside the "restraints from the behavioral prescriptions of his place of origin." This use of a foreign setting makes Spain not merely a background but "a catalyst of textual irony" in the story.

Readers must come to their own conclusions based on the dialogue. This has led to varying interpretations of the story. One point of debate is whether or not the woman decides to get an abortion. Critics like Stanley Renner assert that the details in the story imply that the woman decides to keep the baby: "The logic of the story's design enjoins the conclusion that she smiles brightly at the waitress's announcement of the train because she is no longer headed in the direction of having the abortion that she has contemplated only with intense distress". Other critics conclude that the woman ultimately decides to get an abortion. Furthermore, most critics acknowledge that the story has several possible interpretations: "The two organizing questions of the narrative—will they have the abortion or the baby? Will they break up or stay together?—imply four possible outcomes: 1) they will have the abortion and break up; 2) they will have the abortion and stay together; 3) they will have the baby and break up; and 4) they will have the baby and stay together". There are many essays written which argue for all of these possibilities and more. There is no universal consensus because of the nature of the story; the reader is simply not given much information.

Many other literary analyses focus on Jig’s abortion, but Nilofer Hashmi argues in a journal article that the story is less about her pregnancy and more about the couple’s deteriorating relationship. Throughout the story, the American and Jig experience an emotional disconnection that is seen through their dialogue. Hashmi interprets Jig’s commentary about the white elephants, having “everything”, and her general upbeat disposition as suggestive that she desires a family with the American and to keep the pregnancy. She feels that, in contrast to Jig, the American is aloof and self-centered due to his insistence that the operation is simple and everything will be fine, despite being a medical procedure and having risks. In the ending, Jig’s smile to the American is ambiguous, but Hashmi believes that it is caused by her sudden realization that their relationship is forever changed and they cannot go back to their carefree lifestyle. Through this interpretation, it suggests that the story’s vagueness is not only about Jig’s choice but the emotional fallout of the couple’s opposing desires and their disagreement.

While little context is provided about the characters and the overall story, Hilary Justice offers a new perspective through comparing the story to Hemingway’s personal life. In her article, she examines his life as well as earlier manuscripts of Hills like White Elephants. By comparing early drafts to the published story, she notes the many changes to its imagery, dialogue, and characterization made to add to its overall complexity. A parallel drawn by Justice is Jig’s fears of being a parent and relationships that Hemingway shared in his life. The main argument made is that Hemingway “cross-gendered” elements of his personal life that are seen in Jig’s characterization as a way to express his troubles and anxieties. The story remains ambiguous and open to interpretation, but there are influences from Hemingway’s life that can be seen and drawn to its characters.

=== Symbolism ===
The description of the valley of Ebro, in the opening paragraph, is often seen as having deeper meanings: "It has long been recognized that the two sides of the valley of the Ebro represent two ways of life, one a sterile perpetuation of the aimless hedonism the couple have been pursuing, the other a participation in life in its full natural sense." Critics also point to the various positions of the characters, with relation to the train tracks and the valley, to show a wide variety of possible symbolic interpretations.

Doris Lanier writes about the significance of absinthe (which the girl is reminded of when they drink anisette) in the story. Lanier explains the drink "was alluring not only because of its narcotic effects but also because of its reputation as an aphrodisiac." Lanier asserts that every detail in "Hills Like White Elephants" is intentionally placed by Hemingway, and that the absinthe could have several possible connotations. She postulates that "the addictive quality of the drink…is meant to emphasize the addictive nature of the couple's lifestyle…It is an empty, meaningless existence that revolves around traveling, sex, drinking, looking at things, and having pointless conversations about these things". Another possible interpretation of the absinthe relates to its appeal and effects. Like the man and woman's relationship, it is alluring at first, but "it becomes a destroyer of the child, who is aborted; a destroyer of the girl, who endures the physical and emotional pain of aborting the child she wants; and a destroyer of the couple's relationship". This interpretation assumes the couple have the abortion and end their relationship, as well as that the young woman wants to continue the pregnancy; none of these are certain, due to the ambiguity of the story.

The title "Hills Like White Elephants" is a symbol within Hemingway's short story that requires analysis to depict its meaning and relevance to the story as well. Repetition of words and phrases is a common trait found within Hemingway's short story, a habit that is not done without cause. This was done in an attempt to emphasize importance on certain matters, such as he does with the title of the story. Within the story, Hemingway makes "two references to the whiteness of the hills and four to them as white elephants". The most common belief as to the meaning of this reference has to do with color comparisons used throughout the story. In correlation with the drink "absinthe" as mentioned above, there is believed to be a contrast of joy and sorrow between the black licorice of the alcoholic drink and the whiteness of the hills. This can also be contrasted with the comparison between the white hills and the dry, brown countryside that represents the same joy and sorrow as the former. However, the true meaning of the title does not become fully known until the topic of getting an abortion is revealed between the couple, as the man states, it's an "awfully simple operation... not really an operation at all... just to let the air in". It is then understood that the use of the term "white elephants" may in fact be a reference to the white elephant sale. It's a sale put together through the donation of unwanted gifts, making the reader believe that this may be correlating with the act of getting an abortion. It could also mean the literal translation of elephant in the room meaning something painfully obvious that is not to be spoken about or referenced. "Elephant in the room" is a term used mainly by couples having a relationship crisis or difficulty including break-ups, divorce, cheating, marriage, adoption, or abortion. This is viewed differently between the couple. The child is seen "as simply a white elephant to the man" to be rid of, whereas the woman only sees it as this due to the father's views.

The final reference to the hills is when the girl contemplates her decision of getting an abortion through the following line, "it will be nice again if I say things are like white elephants, and you'll like it?" This is to provide an immediate understanding of the white elephant reference when we learn that the story's conflict revolves around an unwanted pregnancy is associated with the ubiquitous white elephant sale. These sales raise money that is worthwhile cause for people to donate unwanted objects. This is shown in "Hills Like White Elephants" as to the man, the girl is a white elephant with the child.

Another important symbol in the story is the bamboo curtain. Many interpretations see the curtain as a barrier between Jig and the American. Literally, the curtain is a barrier between the American and the girl while he drinks in the bar among other "reasonable people" while the girl sits outside. Figuratively, the beaded curtain separates Jig, a sensitive girl who notices and touches the beads from the American who only acknowledges the drink advertisement and pays no more attention to the curtain than the hills.

David Gilmour points out that the bead curtain has an even more specific symbolism. When Jig takes hold of two strands, the American believes that she views them as a rosary, giving a clue to Jig being Catholic. Gilmour goes on to state that any leap to thinking of Spain, Catholicism, and the abortion as connected ideas is a stretch and if Jig were praying, she would most likely be praying to turn back time so that she may not be entangled with the American. This belief is supported when she states, while holding the two strands, that she wants things to be as they were before. In contrast, Gary Elliott writes that the beaded curtain and its similarity to a rosary lends insight to the girl’s reluctance to go through with the abortion and is almost certainly indicative of her Catholic background. He goes on to say that while the curtain is a physical barrier between the two, it is really her religion, symbolized by the beads, that separates them.

In the time this was published the reference to absinthe can also imply the historical anthelmintic properties of wormwood In the sense that the baby is implied to be a parasite that the man wants to be rid of. Her apparent tone increases the possibility that the statement was an implied accusation against the man for seeing the child as a parasite.

== Dialogue ==
"They look like white elephants," she said.
"I've never seen one," the man drank his beer.
"No, you wouldn't have."
"I might have," the man said. "Just because you say I wouldn't have doesn't prove anything."
The girl looked at the bead curtain. "They've painted something on it," she said. "What does it say?"
"Anis del Toro. It's a drink."
"Can we try it?"

The reader must interpret their dialogue and body language to infer their backgrounds and their attitudes with respect to the situation at hand, and their attitudes toward one another. From the outset of the story, the contentious nature of the couple's conversation indicates resentment and unease. Some critics have written that the dialogue is a distillation of the contrasts between stereotypical male and female relationship roles: in the excerpt above, for instance, the woman draws the comparison with white elephants, but the hyper-rational male immediately denies it, dissolving the bit of poetry into objective realism with "I've never seen one." By saying, "No, you wouldn't have" she implies he hadn't had a child before, or hadn't allowed birth in the past. She also asks his permission to order a drink. Throughout the story, the woman is distant; the American is rational. There may be more serious problems with the relationship than the purely circumstantial. There have been certain critics, that have prompted that the American does not have much metaphorical capacity, through the lens of him purposefully choosing not to engage in a metaphor. This is proposed because he does not see much "beauty or promise" of a fulfilling relationship with Jig. Though the immediate problem is the unwanted pregnancy, the experience has revealed that the relationship is a shallow one. While most critics have espoused relatively straightforward interpretations of the dialogue, a few have argued for alternate scenarios.

== Reception ==
"Hills Like White Elephants" has been criticized for being anti-feminist; it has also been interpreted as being pro-feminist. The anti-feminist perspective emphasizes the notion that the man dominates the woman in the story, and she ultimately succumbs to his will by getting the abortion. Frederick Busch asserts that the woman "'buries her way of seeing as she will bury her child.'" However, critics also argue that the female character makes her own decision in the end, and the story is actually pro-feminist. Stanley Renner claims that "Hills Like White Elephants" is primarily empathetic towards the female character: "So firmly does the story's sympathy side with the girl and her values, so strong is her repugnance toward the idea of abortion, and so critical is the story of the male's self-serving reluctance to shoulder the responsibility of the child he has begotten that the reading I have proposed seems the most logical resolution to its conflict." However, Doris Lanier describes the drink that the woman has as "absinthe," a narcotic that the man uses to influence the woman's mind.

== See also ==
- The Hearts of Lonely People
