= Men Without Women (Hemingway short story collection) =

Book by Ernest Hemingway

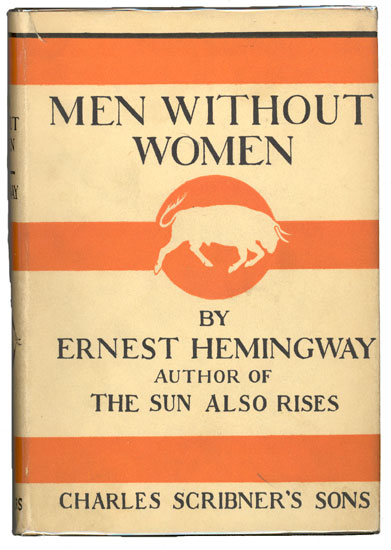
- First edition
- Author: Ernest Hemingway
- Language: English
- Genre: Short stories
- Publisher: Charles Scribner's Sons
- Publication date: 1927
- Publication place: United States
- Media type: Print (hardback & paperback)
- OCLC: 564429937

Men Without Women (1927) is the second collection of short stories written by American author Ernest Hemingway (July 21, 1899 – July 2, 1961). The volume consists of 14 stories, 10 of which had been previously published in magazines. It was published in October 1927, with a first print-run of approximately 7,600 copies at $2.

The stories in this collection cover a variety of topics, including bullfighting, prizefighting, infidelity, divorce, and death. "The Killers", "Hills Like White Elephants", and "In Another Country" are considered to be among Hemingway's better works.

The book's U.S. copyright expired on January 1, 2023, when all works published in 1927 entered the public domain.

== Stories included in volume ==
- "The Undefeated"
- '"In Another Country"
- "Hills Like White Elephants"
- "'The Killers'"
- "'Che Ti Dice La Patria?"
- "Fifty Grand"
- "A Simple Enquiry"
- "Ten Indians"
- "A Canary for One"
- "An Alpine Idyll"
- "A Pursuit Race"
- "Today is Friday"
- "Banal Story"
- "Now I Lay Me"

== Reception ==
Men Without Women was variously received by critics. Cosmopolitan magazine editor-in-chief Ray Long praised the story "Fifty Grand", calling it, "one of the best short stories that ever came to my hands...the best prize-fight story I ever read...a remarkable piece of realism."

Some critics, however – among them Lee Wilson Dodd, whose article entitled "Simple Annals of the Callous" appeared in the Saturday Review of Literature – found Hemingway's subjects lacking. Joseph Wood Krutch called the stories in Men Without Women "sordid little catastrophes", involving "very vulgar people."

Hemingway responded to the less favorable reviews with a poem published in The Little Review in May 1929:

Valentine
(For a Mr. Lee Wilson Dodd and Any of His Friends Who Want It)

Sing a song of critics
pockets full of lye
four and twenty critics
hope that you will die
hope that you will peter out
hope that you will fail
so they can be the first one
be the first to hail
any happy weakening or sign of quick decay.
(All very much alike, weariness too great,
sordid small catastrophes, stack the cards on fate,
very vulgar people, annals of the callous,
dope fiends, soldiers, prostitutes,
men without a gallus

Hemingway's style, on the other hand, received much acclaim. In the New York Times Book Review, Percy Hutchinson praised him for "language sheered to the bone, colloquial language expended with the utmost frugality; but it is continuous and the effect is one of continuously gathering power." Even Krutch, writing in the Nation in 1927, said of Men Without Women, "It appears to be the most meticulously literal reporting and yet it reproduces dullness without being dull."
