= A Simple Enquiry =

Short story by Ernest Hemingway

- Short story by Ernest Hemingway
- Country: United States
- Language: English
- Genre: Short story

Publication
- Published in: The Little Review
- Publication type: Periodical
- Media type: Print
- Publication date: March 1927

"A Simple Enquiry" is a short story written by Ernest Hemingway. It was published in 1927 in the collection Men Without Women and is notable for its focus on homosexuality.

== Synopsis ==
Three Italian soldiers are snowbound. The senior soldier, the Major, calls a 19-year-old orderly into his room and asks whether he had ever loved a woman. Most critics interpret the ensuing conversation as the major propositioning the orderly. When his questions are rebuffed, he dismisses the orderly from the room with the understanding that he will not press the issue. The major questions to himself whether the orderly was telling the truth.

== Characters ==
- The major
- Tonani, an adjutant
- Pinin, the major's orderly
