= Banal Story =

Short story by Ernest Hemingway

"Banal Story" is a short parody written by Ernest Hemingway which appeared in the spring/summer 1926 issue of The Little Review. and the following year (with slight modifications) in the collection Men Without Women.

== Plot summary ==
It depicts a character reading The Forum. The beginning of the story contains a series of hypothetical questions from the fictional copy of The Forum the character is depicted as reading. The story ends with Hemingway describing the death of a famous bullfighter named Manuel Garcia Maera (1896-1924), in Triana, Seville and its aftermath.

== Analysis ==
Phillip Yannella and Wayne Kvam wrote articles on "Banal Story", in the Fitzgerald/Hemingway Annual and subsequently a chapter on the story appeared in Paul Smith's A Reader's Guide to the Short Stories of Ernest Hemingway, then George Monteiro's wrote an article: "The Writer on Vocation: Hemingway's "Banal Story'". The four sources form the story's current critical foundations. They establish the parallels between the stories in The Forum magazine and the death of "Maera", and offer detailed interpretations of the story as a parable and self-reflexive study of writing.

Susan Beegel worries that "Banal Story" will continue to be "neglected because it depends on readers' understanding numerous allusions to The Forum".

Critics question why the two contrasting parts exist in the story and how they relate or diverge from one to the other. Quimby Melton argues 'that the sections have a mutual purpose and dependence that establish the story's essential statement about the relationship of romance and realism.' As several scholars argue, the struggle between these two issues is an important theme of Hemingway's work. Therefore, for all its stylistic novelty, the theme of "Banal Story" resolutely places it with the concerns of Hemingway's larger body of work.
