= A Pursuit Race =

Short story by Ernest Hemingway

"A Pursuit Race" is a 1927 short story by American writer Ernest Hemingway. It was published in the collection Men Without Women.

== Plot summary ==
"A Pursuit Race" tells the story of a man, William Campbell, involved in a "pursuit race" with a burlesque show. The story takes place within a single hotel room in Kansas City, where the racer's boss Mr. Turner finds him. It is first made to seem that the racer is drunk, but it is eventually established that the racer is high on heroin, which is revealed when the racer shows his boss track marks on his arm. The boss attempts to help the racer, but eventually leaves the man alone in the hotel room.

== Reviews ==
- Tom Stoppard called the opening paragraph one of the best in English, he noted that "This is a piece of writing that mimics its subject matter. It is a paragraph in which a burlesque show is in a pursuit race with a metaphor. And what happens is that the burlesque show catches up on the metaphor and the metaphor has to get down from its bicycle and leave the page."
- Charles J. Jr. Nolan writing in Studies in Short Fiction (Vol. 34, Issue 4, Fall 1997) writes that it "has its charms. A close reading of the story, informed by our knowledge of the manuscripts, both reveals Hemingway's skill and gives us a new appreciation of this often neglected work.

== Themes ==
William Campbell embodies the theme of a loser lost to alcohol and heroin. For him and all those like him, life itself has become a pursuit race.

== Adaptation ==
The story appears as a scene in the 1962 film Hemingway's Adventures of a Young Man, featuring Dan Dailey as Campbell and Fred Clark as Mr. Turner.
