= A Day's Wait =

Short story by Ernest Hemingway

- Short story by Ernest Hemingway

Publication
- Published in: The Snows of Kilimanjaro
- Publication date: 1933

"A Day's Wait" is a short story by Ernest Hemingway published in his 1933 short story collection Winner Take Nothing, which portrays a young boy's reaction to becoming ill.

== Plot ==
The story is narrated in first person by the father, who calls his boy Schatz (German, meaning darling). When the boy gets a fever, a doctor prescribes three medicines and tells the boy's father that his temperature is 102 degrees. The boy is quiet and does not listen when his father reads to him Howard Pyle's book about pirates. Later, when the father returns from hunting game, the boy asks when he will die. He had believed his temperature to be lethal because he heard in France (where Celsius is used) that one cannot live with a temperature over 44 degrees. When the father explains to him the difference between Fahrenheit and Celsius, the boy relaxes. The next day, "he cried very easily at little things that were of no importance." This story highlights miscommunication between adult and child.

== Reception ==
Sheldon Norman Grebstein Junior said Hemingway handled "a potentially sentimental situation without expressing feeling in overt terms and without calling directly upon the reader's sense of pathos. We surmise the father's love and concern for his sick son not from any declaration of it in exposition or dialogue but rather from a series of observations, gestures and dramatic metaphors".
