= An Alpine Idyll =

Short story by Ernest Hemingway

- Short story by Ernest Hemingway

Publication
- Published in: Men Without Women
- Publication date: 1927

"An Alpine Idyll" is a short story by American writer Ernest Hemingway, set in Austria and presumably featuring protagonist Nick Adams, though not explicitly named. It was published in the 1927 collection Men Without Women, having previously been rejected by Scribner's Magazine as being too shocking for their genteel readers.

== Plot summary ==
A mature Nick and a friend, John, return from a ski trip to Galtur. The story takes place in spring, with the characters noting that the season was not good for skiing and lamenting that they had stayed in Silvretta Alps too long. The story begins with Nick and John witnessing a peasant burial. The story concludes with Nick and John, who had gone into an inn for drinks, having a discussion with the innkeeper and the sexton who had performed the burial. There is a revelation that the peasant widower, who had been snowbound with his dead wife for months, had reportedly kept her body in the woodshed and used her mouth to hold a lantern. The characters wonder whether the story was true, and the innkeeper indicated it must have been, since the peasants were "beasts."

== Reviews ==
Joseph W. Krutch reviews the story in The Nation at the time saying that it "makes the readers suddenly weary, both physically and spiritually". Another reviewer describes the work as "a gruesome tale written with great economy of detail.

== Analysis ==
The story is known to be "hard to analyse". Several commentators of the 1950s and 1960s suggest that the skiing and corpse episodes may be thematically related. Edmund Wilson believes that because the skiers feel oppressed by remaining too long in the mountains, perhaps the same unnatural environment has had a dehumanizing effect on the peasant. Carlos Baker feels that the peasant may now be ashamed by the 'natural' people of the valley.
