= Ten Indians =

Short story by Ernest Hemingway

"Ten Indians" is a short story by American writer Ernest Hemingway, featuring protagonist Nick Adams, Hemingway's autobiographical alter ego. It was published in 1927 in the collection Men Without Women. The title is derived from a comment made by Mr. Garner - "That makes nine of them" - after moving an Indian (Native American) who had passed out on the road. The title also alludes to the 1864 children's song, Ten Little Indians.

== Plot summary ==
Set in North Michigan on the Fourth of July it features Nick Adams as he is travelling home with Joe Garner and their family in a large wagon. They pass several drunk Indians and then Joe Garner has to stop and pull a drunk Indian out of the road, which he says is the ninth. The Garners joke about the state of the Indians, and the two sons also disparage Nick's Indian girlfriend Pru and that she smells like a skunk. Nick feels uncomfortable and denies that she is his girlfriend.

When Nick returns home from the Garners his father says that today he saw Pru in the woods with a someone called Frank Washburn. His father said that they seemed happy and that they 'threshed about' in the woods. Nick starts to cry. That next morning Nick takes a while to remember the heartbreak.

== Analysis ==
By depicting a large group of drunken Indians the story reinforces common racial prejudices against Native Americans. Nick feels unable to challenge the Garners views. Nick's father is also unhappy about Nick's relationship with Pru, it is also implied that he lied to his son about Pru 'threshing about' with Frank.
