= The Killers (Hemingway short story) =

1927 short story by Ernest Hemingway

- Short story by Ernest Hemingway
- Country: United States
- Language: English
- Genre: Crime fiction

Publication
- Publisher: Scribner's Magazine
- Media type: Short story
- Publication date: 1927

"The Killers" is a short story by Ernest Hemingway, first published in Scribner's Magazine in 1927 and later republished in Men Without Women, Snows of Kilimanjaro, and The Nick Adams Stories. Set in 1920s Summit, Illinois, the story follows recurring Hemingway character Nick Adams as he has a run-in with a pair of hitmen, who are seeking to kill a boxer, in a local restaurant.

Historians have some documents showing that the working title of the piece was "The Matadors". Hemingway received $200 (equivalent to $3,707 in 2025) for the story, and told F. Scott Fitzgerald he submitted it solely "to see what the alibi would be" should it be rejected. Hemingway's depiction of the human experience, his use of satire, and the themes of death, friendship, and the purpose of life have contributed to make "The Killers" one of his most famous and frequently anthologized short stories, and it has been adapted or referenced in various other works since its initial publishing.

== Plot summary ==
In 1920s Prohibition-era Summit, Illinois, hitmen Max and Al enter the restaurant "Henry's Lunch-Room", staffed by George, the owner, and Sam, the cook. They order pork chops and chicken dinners but, learning they are not yet available, settle for ham, bacon, and egg breakfasts. Suddenly, Al takes restaurant patron Nick Adams into the kitchen and ties him up alongside Sam, while Max converses with George and reveals he and Al have been hired to kill Ole Andreson, a Swedish ex-heavyweight prizefighter expected to arrive at the restaurant soon. However, when Andreson does not arrive, Max and Al leave to search themselves. After they depart, George sends Nick to Hirsch's Boarding House, run by Mrs. Bell, to warn Andreson about the hitmen. Nick finds Andreson in his room, but is surprised when Andreson does not react to the news, and simply tells Nick there is nothing that can be done to save him. Nick returns to Henry's Lunch-Room to inform George of Andreson's dismissive reaction; when George no longer seems concerned for Andreson, an unsettled Nick decides to leave Summit.

== Historical context ==
"The Killers" was written in the 1920s, when organized crime was at its peak during Prohibition. Chicago was the home of Al Capone, and Hemingway himself spent time in Chicago as a young man. When things became too dangerous for the mob, they retreated to the suburb of Summit, where "The Killers" takes place. Not long before the story was written, the Chicago mob had ordered the killing of a popular boxer of the time, Andre Anderson. His killer, Leo Mongoven, went on the run after the killing in 1926 and was captured following a traffic collision that killed Chicago banker John J. Mitchell and his wife in 1927; Hemingway was probably unaware of the accident as his short story went into print. Anderson once defeated Jack Dempsey, likely Hemingway's source for the character of Ole Andreson.

Despite Hemingway's knowledge of organized crime, he omitted much of that background from the story. Hemingway himself said, "That story probably had more left out of it than anything I ever wrote. I left out all Chicago, which is hard to do in 2951 words."

The story includes several instances of the word "nigger" as description of the cook, both in the characters' dialogue and from the 3rd person limited narrator. The cook, Sam, is only in this scene, though he is referred to in a scene that follows shortly thereafter.

In 1984, Oak Park and River Forest High School in Oak Park, Illinois published the anthology Hemingway at Oak Park High, which included short works that Hemingway had written for his school newspaper and literary magazine. One of the stories, "A Matter of Colour", involves the plot of a boxing manager having a man named Swede hide behind a curtain and hit an opponent during a bout; the Swede fails, and the reader is left with an impression that in retaliation, the boxing manager puts out a contract on his life.

== Adaptations ==
- The Killers (1946), a film starring Burt Lancaster and Ava Gardner
- "The Wait" ("La espera" in Spanish) (1950), a short story by Jorge Luis Borges that reinterprets its meaning
- The Killers (1956), a short film directed by Andrei Tarkovsky, Aleksandr Gordon, and Marika Beiku
- The Killers (1959), a television special starring Ingemar Johansson, Dean Stockwell, and Diane Baker on CBS's Buick-Electra Playhouse
- The Killers (1964), a film starring Lee Marvin, Ronald Reagan, and Angie Dickinson
- Carnal Circuit (Original Italian title: Femmine insaziabili) (1969), an unofficial adaptation as a giallo
- "Bullet in the Brain" (1995), a short story by Tobias Wolff
- "The Killers", a manga short story by Mamoru Oshii, featured in the 2003–2004 manga Kerberos Saga Rainy Dogs
- "The Killers in the Diner", the fourth episode of Lupin the 3rd Part 6 (2021), written by Mamoru Oshii, features a retelling of "The Killers" (with elements of Oshii's manga) as the cast searches for a rare printing of the short story.
