= The Undefeated (short story) =

Short story by Ernest Hemingway

1968 standalone edition (publ. Higher School Publishing House, Moscow)

"The Undefeated" is a short story by Ernest Hemingway and first published in the German magazine Der Querschnitt. It was featured later in Hemingway's 1927 story collection, Men Without Women. The story deals with an ageing bullfighter’s return to the sport after an injury.

== Plot ==
The main character, Manuel García, is a bullfighter who recently got out of the hospital and is now looking for work in Madrid. After an old promoter, Retana, hires him for a "nocturnal" fight on the following evening, he enlists the help of an old friend, Zurito, to be his picador. Although Zurito discourages Manuel, Manuel proceeds with the fight and is injured while fighting his first bull of the night, ending up back in the infirmary at the end of the story.
