= In Another Country =

Short story by Ernest Hemingway

- Short story by Ernest Hemingway
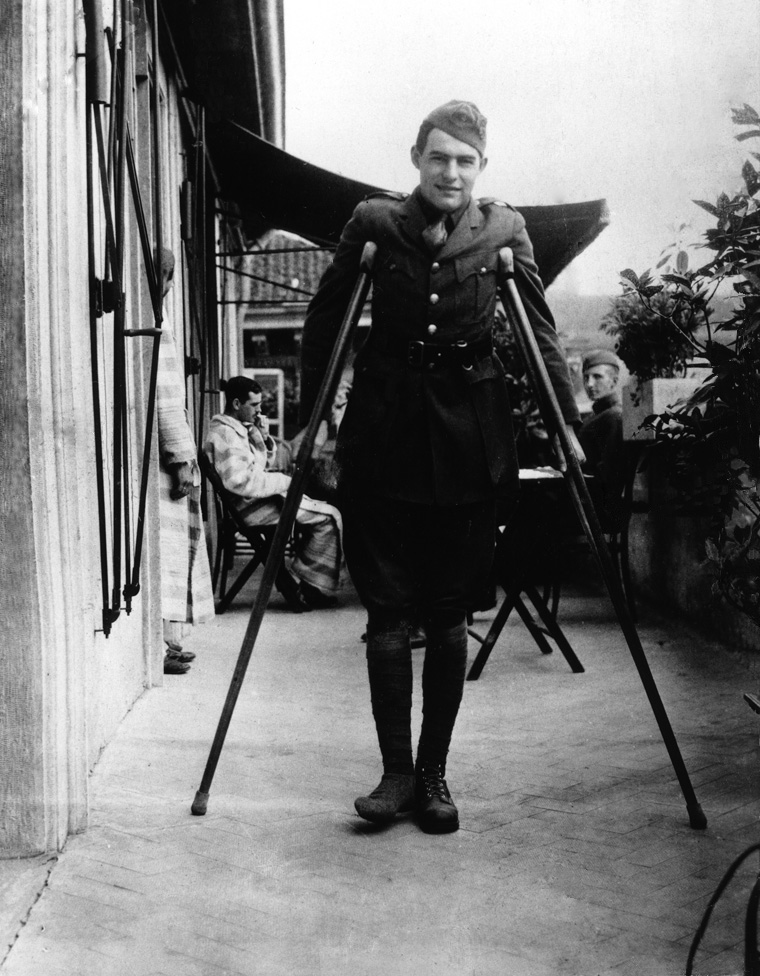
- Ernest Hemingway in Italy, 1918
- Country: United States
- Language: English
- Genre: short story

Publication
- Published in: Men Without Women
- Publication type: short story collection
- Publication date: 1927

Chronology
| The Undefeated | Hills Like White Elephants |

"In Another Country" is a short story by American author Ernest Hemingway. It was published in Hemingway's 1927 short story collection, Men Without Women. The story deals with WWI soldiers receiving treatment in Italy during the war.

== Summary ==
The short story is about an ambulance corps member in Milan during World War I. Although unnamed, he is assumed to be Nick Adams, a character Hemingway made to represent himself. He has an injured knee and visits a hospital daily for rehabilitation. Machines are used to speed the healing with the doctors making much of the miraculous new technology. They show pictures to the wounded of injuries like theirs healed by the machines, but the war-hardened soldiers are portrayed as skeptical, perhaps justifiably so.

As the narrator walks through the streets with fellow soldiers, the townspeople hate them openly because they are officers. Their oasis is Café Cova, where the waitresses are very patriotic.

When the fellow soldiers admire the protagonist's medal, they learn that he is American, and therefore view him as an outsider. The protagonist accepts this since he feels that they have done far more to earn their medals than he has.

The story then shifts to the friendship between the narrator and an Italian major, who was once a champion fencer but now has a withered hand that has not been cured by the machines. The major becomes grief stricken when he learns that his wife has suddenly and unexpectedly died of pneumonia.

The American writer Andre Dubus, who cites this story as an influence on his own writing, sees "In Another Country" as a story about healing and the desire to survive despite suffering. Dubus writes, "The major keeps going to the machines. And he doesn't believe in them. But he gets out of his bed in the morning. He brushes his teeth. He shaves. He combs his hair. He puts on his uniform. He leaves the place where he lives. He walks to the hospital, and sits at the machines. Every one of those actions is a movement away from suicide. Away from despair."
