= Fifty Grand =

Short story by Ernest Hemingway

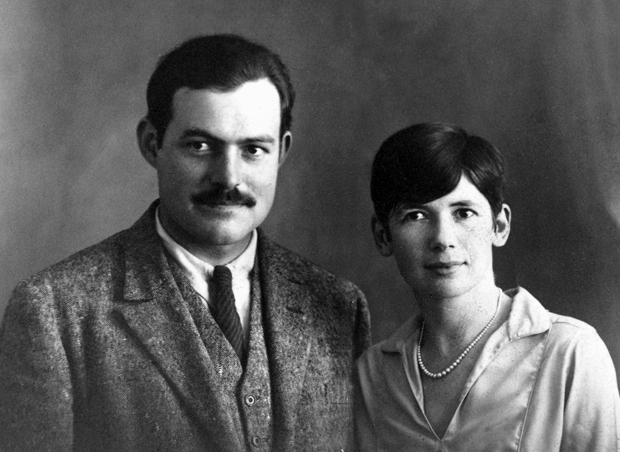
Ernest and Pauline Hemingway, Paris, 1927

"Fifty Grand" is a short story by Ernest Hemingway. It was first published in The Atlantic Monthly in 1927, and it appeared later that year in Hemingway's short story collection Men Without Women.

"Fifty Grand" tells the story of Jack Brennan as he trains for and boxes in his fight with challenger Jimmy Walcott. The first part of the story takes place in New Jersey, the second in New York City. It shows Hemingway's love for and knowledge of boxing, and his use of omission and understatement.

== Plot ==
Jack Brennan, the current welterweight champion, is at Danny Hogan's New Jersey training camp (called the "health farm" throughout the story) struggling to get in shape for his upcoming fight with favorite Jimmy Walcott. His trainer and friend Jerry Doyle is at the camp with him, and it is Doyle who narrates the story. Jack is not optimistic about the fight and does not adjust to life at the health farm; "He didn't like being away from his wife and the kids and he was sore and grouchy most of the time," Doyle reports. Hogan and Doyle talk briefly about racehorses, and when they ask Jack whether he bets on them, Jack replies that he stopped because he lost money.

Jack asks Doyle what he thinks of the shape he is in. Doyle tries to stall, saying: "Well, you can't tell ... You got a week to get around into form," but Jack asks for a straight answer. Doyle finally tells him, "You're not right," at which point Jack confides that he has been unable to sleep, despite being tired, because he misses his wife. Hogan, seeing Jack's condition a few days later, tells Doyle that Jack has no chance against Walcott. Doyle replies, "Well ... everybody's got to get it sometime."

The day before the fight, Jack lists the things that concern him when he can not sleep: "I worry about property I got up in the Bronx, I worry about property I got in Florida. I worry about the kids. I worry about the wife. Sometimes I think about fights." For the rest of the day Jack is in a foul mood as he tries to loosen up and run through a few rounds of shadowboxing, but even then he does not look good. Jack cannot break a sweat jumping rope and stops working for the day.

That afternoon John Collins, Jack's manager, drives to the health farm with two well-dressed men named Steinfelt and Morgan. They go with Doyle to Jack's room and find him sleeping, but John wakes him up and asks Doyle to leave and tell Hogan the three visitors "want to see him in about half an hour." Hogan tells Doyle that Steinfelt and Morgan are "wise guys" who own a pool-room, describing Steinfelt as a "big operator". Doyle and Hogan wait in the office, knowing the men do not want to be interrupted, until half an hour has elapsed. When they return to Jack's room, Steinfelt proposes having a drink. John, Steinfelt, Morgan, and Hogan all have several drinks; while Jack and Doyle only have one each. When John suggests Jack have another drink, he refuses – saying "I never liked to go to these wakes". The visitors leave. Jack remains quiet through the rest of the day. Later that evening, he drinks heavily and suggests Doyle put money on Walcott, confiding that he himself has bet "fifty grand" on the opposing boxer. He reassures himself of this action's morality, saying, "It ain't crooked. How can I beat him? Why not make money on it?" Jack eventually passes out and Doyle puts him to bed.

Jack and Doyle make the journey to New York City the next morning, during which Jack is stingy with his money. After weighing in, Jack goes with Doyle to the hotel room the two are sharing; though Doyle's brother-in-law lives in the area, Jack wants to get his money's worth out of the double room and asks him to stay. The two play cribbage and, when John comes, they continue playing until Jack has won four and a half dollars. Before dinner, he says they should play another round to decide who will pay for dinner. The cribbage continues after dinner, with Jack winning another two and a half dollars, until the time comes to go to Madison Square Garden.

Entering the ring at the Garden, Jack meets Walcott's cheerful words with cranky abruptness. The fight begins. Doyle reports, "There wasn't anybody ever boxed better than Jack," and the fight goes well for Jack for several rounds as his left fist repeatedly connects with Walcott's face. By the seventh round, Jack's left arm gets heavy and Walcott begins to gain the upper hand as he pummels Jack's torso. After the eleventh round John Collins tells Jack the fight will go to Walcott, but Jack says he thinks he can last through the twelfth round and goes to meet Walcott and "finish it off right to please himself." Walcott backs Jack up against the ropes and delivers a very low blow; Jack, in obvious pain, stays standing–"if he went down, there go fifty thousand bucks" because he would win on a foul–and tells the referee not to call the foul because it must have been an accident. He walks toward the dumbfounded Walcott and begins swinging, landing several body punches before hitting his opponent twice below the belt. Walcott falls and wins the match on a foul.

Back in the dressing room, Jack comments, "It's funny how fast you can think when it means that much money." John says, "You're some boy, Jack." "No," Jack replies. "It was nothing."

== Background and publication history ==
=== Story ===
Years before writing "Fifty Grand", Hemingway wrote a boxing story which appeared in the April 1916 edition of Oak Park High School's literary magazine Tabula. This story, called "A Matter of Colour", was more obviously comical than "Fifty Grand", but the two bear several similarities, such as a non-protagonist narrator and a "trickster out-tricked" theme. Though authors today seldom write about boxing, stories like "Fifty Grand" were common and popular in the late 19th and early 20th century. For example, George Bernard Shaw's Cashel Byron's Profession, written in 1882 but not popular until about 20 years later, featured a prizefighter as its protagonist (though Shaw said the fight scenes in the novel were supposed to turn the public away from boxing). Jack London's "A Piece of Steak" was published in the Saturday Evening Post in November 1909. Sir Arthur Conan Doyle also wrote several stories about boxing, such as Rodney Stone and The Croxley Master, and made his famous Sherlock Holmes an amateur boxer. Octavus Roy Cohen's "Last Blow", published on 2 October 1926 issue of Colliers, appeared the year before "Fifty Grand" and P. G. Wodehouse's "The Debut of Battling Billson" found a place in both Strand and Cosmopolitan in 1923, being published on both sides of the Atlantic. "Fifty Grand" thus fit into an established genre.

Weeks writes, "Once The Sun Also Rises was sent off to the publisher, Hemingway wrote in his notebook in early 1926 that he wanted to write short stories 'for four or five months,'" and "Fifty Grand" was one of the results. In its original version, "Fifty Grand" opened with Jack answering a question about how he beat Benny Leonard. Jack says, "Well you see Benny's an awful smart boxer. All the time he's in there he's thinking and all the time he's thinking I was hitting him," and the subsequent two and a half pages led into the story as it now exists. F. Scott Fitzgerald had urged Hemingway to submit "Fifty Grand" for publication, but the editor at Scribner's requested that Hemingway shorten the story. Hemingway, unable to remove anything from the story, allowed writer Manuel Komroff to cut it for him, but found his efforts unsatisfactory. The story finally appeared in the July 1927 issue of The Atlantic Monthly, under Ellery Sedgwick's owner-editorship, after Fitzgerald persuaded Hemingway to remove the first three pages, arguing that the Britton-Leonard fight they alluded to was too well known. Hemingway later resented Fitzgerald for this advice and scrawled on one of the typescripts of "Fifty Grand": "1st 3 pages of story mutilated by Scott Fitzgerald with his [undecipherable]."

=== Inspirations ===
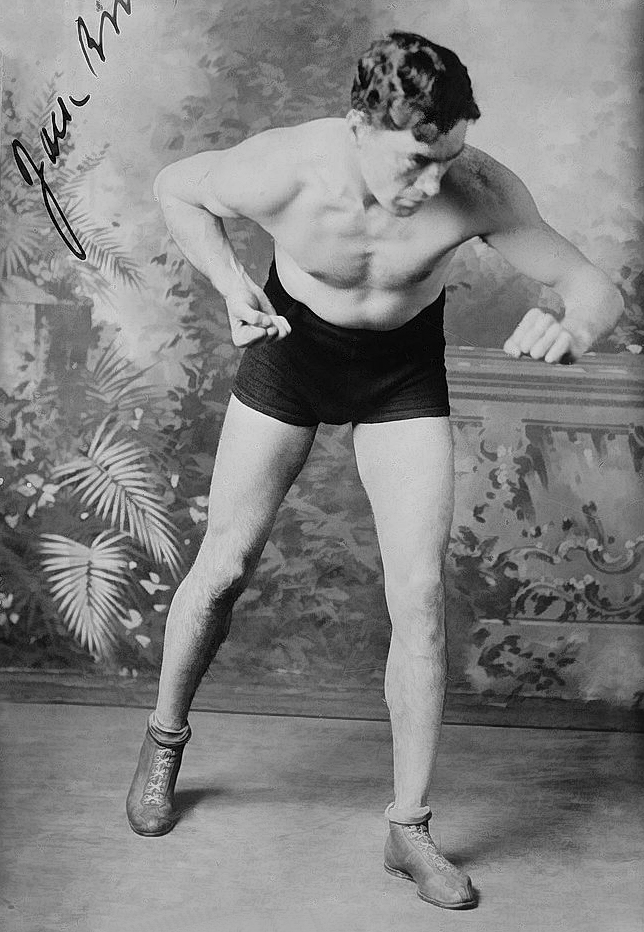
Jack Britton

Many scholars have searched for the inspiration behind this story in actual boxing matches Hemingway would have known of or attended. According to Philip G. and Rosemary R. Davies, Hemingway seems to have based the story on the 1 November 1922 welterweight championship fight between Jack Britton and Mickey Walker. Though Hemingway was traveling from Istanbul to Paris when the fight took place, "The use of similar or identical names for the characters and the stress on Brennan's age show the resemblance between the short story and actual circumstances", and Hemingway could have gleaned many of these details from newspapers.

James J. Martine disagrees, however, writing that "the fictional Jack Brennan–Jimmy Walcott fight is an amalgamation of at least two real-life bouts", and arguing that Hemingway was simply "presenting the times" by writing of common occurrences such as fouls and attempted fixes, whatever influence the Britton–Walker fight may have had. He offers another possible influence, the Battling Siki–Georges Carpentier light heavyweight championship match of September 24, 1922. This fight, unlike the Britton–Walker bout, ended with a foul when Siki was clearly about to win the fight, an outcome which "started the hundreds of Americans at ringside to shouting 'robber.'" Martine adds, "If a man standing at ringside in a photo of the knockdown is not Hemingway, one critic has offered to eat the New York Times September 26, 1922, p. 14, and the rest of the paper." Ultimately, he concludes, the events of "Fifty Grand" are representative of common events in the 1920s.

== Themes and analysis ==
=== Themes ===
Many critics place Jack among Hemingway's "code heroes", though there is disagreement as to whether or not he adheres to the code entirely. Fenton noted in 1952 that Jack fits the ideals of a professional, showing the ability to think and commitment to and knowledge of his sport. His skill and craftsmanship in the ring stands in stark contrast to the brute strength and crude force employed by the slower, heavier Walcott. Fenton suggests that the story "clarified the relationship between courage and professionalism." Hemingway never mentions courage by name in "Fifty Grand"; "It is apparent, however, that courage is a part of Brennan's behaviour", and that "Thinking ... is what distinguishes the professional." Martine agrees that "Jack is the consummate professional", but offers the opposite reason: "He is a skilled and trained professional who does not have to think. The code relates to grace under pressure, in pain."

Philip G. and Rosemary R. Davies read Jack as a code hero, whose courage is partly obscured by the facts of the Britton–Walker fight on which they believe Hemingway based the story. "Brennan's courage, while real, cannot reverse the impression created by the bulk of the story", they write, unable to find Jack admirable until the final pages. They argue that Hemingway tried to show Jack's courage by giving him motives other than the obvious monetary one—they cite the statement, "His money was all right and now he wanted to finish it off right to please himself. He didn't want to be knocked out", as evidence of Hemingway's attempt—but conclude of Hemingway stories in general, "The code of the hero can be seen most clearly when the courageous action is performed for its own sake."

Cassandre Meunier notes the emphasis Hemingway places on Jack's silence throughout the story. She writes, "The impression is that Jack finds confidence in private places: it is not necessary to explain to anyone what is good for him and his family; just shutting his eyes and cutting himself off from the external world gives him the confidence that his choice is—and eventually was—the right one." As well as a source of confidence, she says, the boxer's "holding tight" in the early parts of the story prepare him for "holding tight" and finishing the fight in the midst of excruciating pain in the final scenes. "One of the features associated with dignity is control over oneself."

Robert P. Weeks, in his essay, found in Jackson J. Benson's collection of critical essays on Hemingway's works, comments on the machine imagery used during the boxing match itself: "During the first eleven rounds Jack boxes doggedly, mechanically ... Jerry also sees Walcott as a mechanism, but of a lower order." The use of this imagery continues until Walcott fouls Jack. Then, "No longer a machine, Jack is alert, analytical, shrewd ... Walcott remains a machine: he's been signaled to deliver a low blow; he's done it; now he stands there baffled as the man he has fouled insists upon fighting on." Weeks sees a great deal of humor in the story, humor which becomes evident when one takes "Fifty Grand" as the descendant of Hemingway's more obviously comical "A Matter of Colour". Even with the humor at both boxers' expense, he concludes that "Jack has done much more than protect his fifty grand; he has, through his quickwittedness and stoicism, prevailed without loss of his self-respect."

=== The fix ===
Most critics and readers conclude that Jack agrees to lose the fight during his meeting with John Collins, Morgan, and Steinfelt. Earl Rovit believes that Jack "breaks [Hemingway's moral] code in betting against himself." "There is nothing 'unethical'", Martine counters, "about getting some small consideration for participation in the game" in Hemingway's view. James Tackach, on the other hand, argues that Jack did not agree to lose during the meeting with John Collins, Steinfelt, and Morgan. As evidence he cites Jack's assertion, "It ain't crooked. How can I beat him?", the illogicality for Steinfelt and Morgan to pay the underdog to throw the match, and that "If Jack agreed to lose the fight, he would have accepted a flat payment from Steinfelt and Morgan for the loss, and he would not have to risk his own money by laying a bet." It may also be possible that Steinfelt and Morgan also organized for Walcott to throw the match with the low blow, as John reveals "They certainly tried a nice double-cross."

== Reception ==
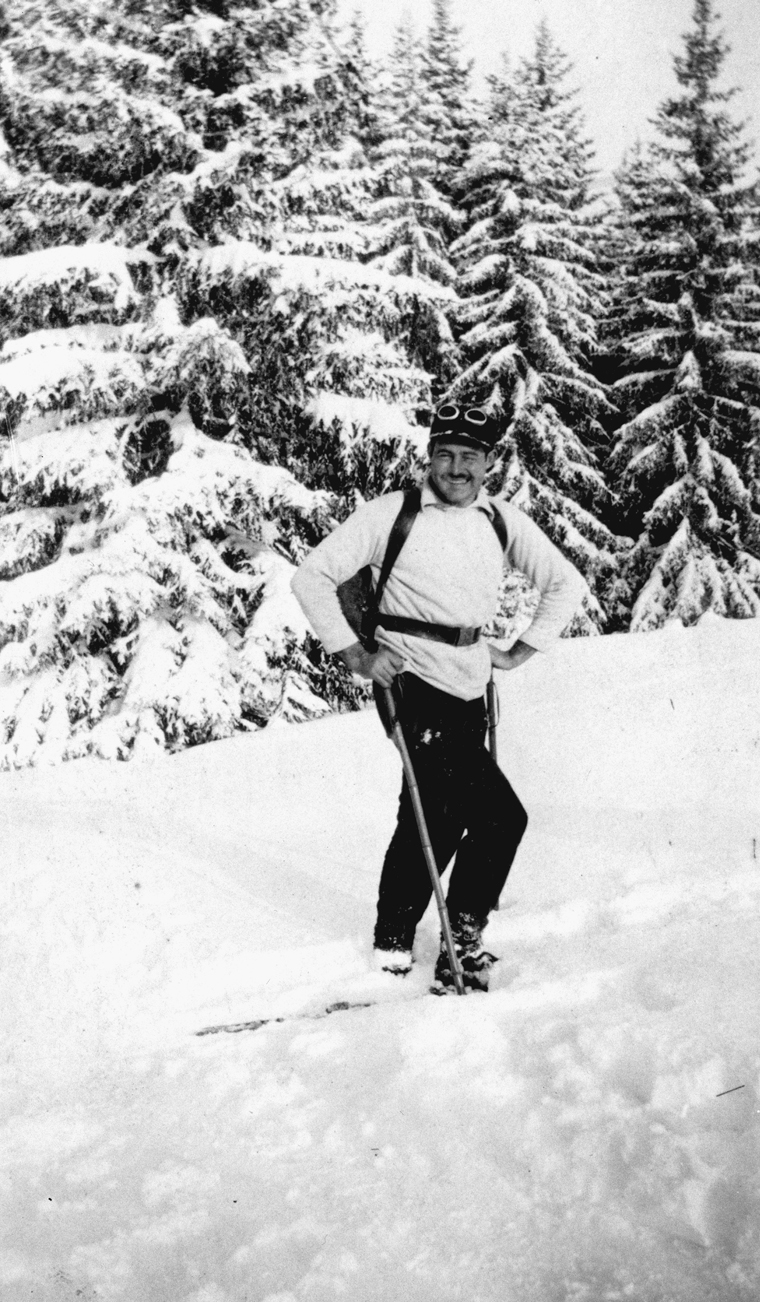
Ernest Hemingway skiing, Switzerland, 1927

Men Without Women was variously received. Cosmopolitan magazine editor-in-chief Ray Long praised "Fifty Grand", calling it, "one of the best short stories that ever came to my hands...the best prize-fight story I ever read...a remarkable piece of realism." However, some critics—among them Wilson Lee Dodd, whose article entitled "Simple Annals of the Callous" appeared in the Saturday Review of Literature—found Hemingway's subjects lacking. Joseph Wood Krutch called the stories in Men Without Women "Sordid little catastrophes" involving "very vulgar people."

Hemingway responded to the less favorable reviews with a poem published in The Little Review in May 1929:

Valentine
(For a Mr. Lee Wilson Dodd and Any of His Friends Who Want It)

Sing a song of critics
pockets full of lye
four and twenty critics
hope that you will die
hope that you will peter out
hope that you will fail
so they can be the first one
be the first to hail
any happy weakening or sign of quick decay.
(All very much alike, weariness too great,
sordid small catastrophes, stack the cards on fate,
very vulgar people, annals of the callous,
dope fiends, soldiers, prostitutes,
men without a gallus)

Hemingway's style, on the other hand, received much acclaim. In the New York Times Book Review, Percy Hutchinson praised him for "language sheered to the bone, colloquial language expended with the utmost frugality; but it is continuous and the effect is one of continuously gathering power." Even Krutch, writing in the Nation in 1927, said of Men Without Women, "It appears to be the most meticulously literal reporting and yet it reproduces dullness without being dull."
