= Now I Lay Me =

1927 short story by Ernest Hemingway

- Short story by Ernest Hemingway
- Country: United States
- Language: English
- Genre: short story

Publication
- Published in: Men Without Women
- Publication type: short story collection
- Publication date: 1927

"Now I Lay Me" is a short story by American author Ernest Hemingway, the title is taken from the prayer "Now I Lay Me Down to Sleep". It is one of Hemingway's Nick Adams stories and part of Hemingway's collection of short stories titled Men Without Women, which was published in 1927.

== Description ==
The short story takes place in war-torn Europe, specifically in Italy, which Hemingway chose due to his firsthand experiences there. "Now I Lay Me" is a short story about two men sleeping in a tent. However simple a story it may be, it reveals the psyche of military men. Although it is never completely affirmed, the context of the story suggests that the two men are injured and in some sort of a military or hospital tent. The main character, Nick Adams, refuses to sleep while it is dark outside, claiming that he is fearful of losing his soul. However, it is implied that he actually suffers from a form of PTSD from a previous raid. The other man in the tent, Nick's orderly John, also has difficulty sleeping. This short story goes deep into Nick's mind and shows the reader what he does to make it through the night. The discussion between the two men concludes the rest of the story, John referring to Nick as "Signor Tenente" (Sir Lieutenant).

"Now I Lay Me" is a prime example of the cynicism that characterizes the writing of the Lost Generation.
