= Hemingway House =

Hemingway House may refer to:

== Cuba ==
- Finca Vigía, Ernest Hemingway's house in Havana

== United States ==
- Hemingway House and Barn (Fayetteville, Arkansas), listed on the National Register of Historic Places (NRHP) in Washington County
- Hemingway House (Little Rock, Arkansas), listed on the NRHP in Little Rock

=== Associated with Ernest Hemingway ===
- Birthplace of Ernest Hemingway, Ernest Hemingway's birthplace and childhood home
- Ernest Hemingway Cottage, Walloon Lake, Michigan, NRHP-listed, Hemingway family's summer retreat
- Pfeiffer House and Carriage House, Piggott, Arkansas, Ernest Hemingway's residence in the late 1920's
- Ernest Hemingway House, Key West, Florida, NRHP-listed, also known as Hemingway House & Museum, Ernest Hemingway's home in the 1930's
- Hotel Ambos Mundos, Havana, Cuba, Ernest Hemingway's residence in the 1930's
- Finca Vigía, Havana, Cuba, Ernest Hemingway's home in the 1940's and 50's
- Ernest and Mary Hemingway House, Ketchum, Idaho, NRHP-listed, Ernest Hemingway's final home
