= New Atlantis (micronation) =

Former micronation

- Unrecognized micronation
- Map of Jamaica with the former location of New Atlantis^{[Note 1]}
- Claimed by: Leicester Hemingway
- Dates claimed: 1964–1966
- Area claimed: Raft off the coast of Jamaica

New Atlantis was a micronation formed by Leicester Hemingway, the brother of Ernest Hemingway. The "island", a 240 sq ft (22 m^{2}) bamboo raft off the coast of Jamaica, was established as a constitutional republic on July 4, 1964.

== History ==
In 1964, Hemingway constructed a raft and had it towed 6 mi (9.7 km) off the coast of Jamaica, near the community of Bluefields. The raft was primarily composed of bamboo, steel, iron piping, and rock. It was anchored on a shallow ocean bank with an old Ford engine block and measured 8 ft × 30 ft (2.4 m × 9.1 m). At the time, the area was considered international waters.

On July 4, 1964, Hemingway established New Atlantis as a republic, claiming the area around his raft. He wrote the constitution with a typewriter and copied it almost verbatim from the Constitution of the United States. He argued that his raft was technically an island and based his sovereignty on the Guano Islands Act of 1856. He claimed the unoccupied half of his raft was United States territory, while the other half was the nation of New Atlantis.

By 1965, there were six inhabitants of New Atlantis. This included the Hemingway family of Leicester, his wife Doris, and their two daughters Anne (age 7) and Hilary (age 3). Joining them was public relations specialist Edward K. Moss and his assistant Julia Cellini. The group unanimously elected Leicester as president. His election saw significant press coverage, and made front-page headlines in neighboring Jamaica.

Hemingway's goal was to experiment with democracy and to research marine life in the Caribbean Sea. He formed the International Marine Research Society, an organization headquartered on the raft with the aim of funding and furthering the study of marine biology. Ultimately, Hemingway sought to build a research aquarium in Jamaica.

Initially funded through the publication of My Brother, Ernest Hemingway, Hemingway planned to finance his operations with the sale of stamps. Although several batches of stamps had already been printed, the Universal Postal Union refused to recognize their validity. Hemingway mailed a stamp featuring Lyndon B. Johnson to the White House and claimed international recognition when the reply letter from the U.S. State Department addressed him as "Acting President". He also intended to mint coins, write books and scripts, and encourage tourism.

Hemingway planned to expand his domain considerably. He claimed the seafloor 50 feet below the raft as his and intended to create his own artificial island by piling up rocks. However, within a few years of establishment, New Atlantis was destroyed by tropical storms. The wreckage was then salvaged by local fishermen.

== Administration ==
Flag of New Atlantis

Hemingway authorized his own currency, which he called the "scruple". It consisted of trinkets such as fish hooks, carob beans, shark teeth, and other miscellany. A flag was sewn by Doris Hemingway, which, along with other memorabilia, was donated to the Harry Ransom Center in 1966.

== Notes ==
1.^{1} The article states 78 degrees 4 minutes longitude, 18 degrees 1 minute latitude. The geodetic datum used is unspecified.
