= Community library =

Community library may refer to:

- Library branch
- Subscription library
- The Community Library, a public library in Ketchum, Idaho
