= Leicester Hemingway =

American writer (1915–1982)

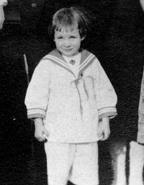
- Leicester Hemingway as a child, c. 1917
- Born: April 1, 1915; Oak Park, Illinois, U.S.
- Died: September 13, 1982 (aged 67); Miami Beach, Florida, U.S.
- Occupation: Writer
- Spouses: Patricia Shedd; Doris Mae Dunning
- Children: 4, including Hilary
- Mother: Grace Hall Hemingway
- Relatives: Ernest Hemingway (brother)

Leicester Clarence Hemingway (April 1, 1915 – September 13, 1982) was an American writer. He was the younger brother of writer Ernest Hemingway and wrote six books, including a first novel entitled The Sound of the Trumpet (1953), based on Leicester's experiences in France and Germany during World War II.

In 1961, Leicester published My Brother, Ernest Hemingway, a biography. The work was well-received and brought Leicester both recognition as a writer in his own right and significant financial rewards. With the capital from the work, Hemingway created the micronation of New Atlantis on a raft off the coast of Jamaica, intended to serve as a marine research headquarters. The project was cut short when New Atlantis was destroyed in a 1966 tropical storm.

== Early life and family ==
Hemingway was born in Oak Park, Illinois to Clarence Edmonds Hemingway, a physician, and Grace Hall Hemingway, a musician. He was the youngest of six siblings, the others being Marcelline (1898–1963), Ernest (1899–1961), Ursula (1902–1966), Madelaine (1904–1995), and Carol (1911–2002).

== Personal life ==
Hemingway married twice. With his first wife, Patricia "Patti" Shedd, he had two sons, Jacob Edmonds and Peter. With his second wife, Doris Mae Dunning, he had two daughters, Anne and author Hilary Hemingway.

== Suicide ==
In 1982, Hemingway killed himself with a gunshot to the head after having suffered several years from Type 2 diabetes, which required several operations.

== New Atlantis ==
Hemingway founded his micronation of New Atlantis on an 8 foot by 30 foot (2.5 m x 9 m) raft he had towed 12 nautical miles (22 km) out from Jamaica, in July 1964. He utilized the 1856 Guano Islands Act to claim half of the raft as a new nation and half for the United States. Hemingway also "wrote" a constitution, which was a copy of the U.S. Constitution with the words "New Atlantis" substituted for "United States". New Atlantis' purpose was to generate money for oceanographic research by selling coins and stamps. In 1966, the micronation was ravaged by a storm and then ransacked by fishermen.

== Sources ==
- Leicester Hemingway, 1915-1982; New Atlantis Collection, 1964-66 Harry Ransom Center, University of Texas at Austin
- Samuel Pyeatt Menefee, "Republics of the Reefs: Nation-Building on the Continental Shelf and in the World's Oceans", California Western Journal of International Law, vol. 25, no. 1, Fall, 1994, pp. 104–05.
- Family records
