= The Doctor and the Doctor's Wife =

Short story by Ernest Hemingway

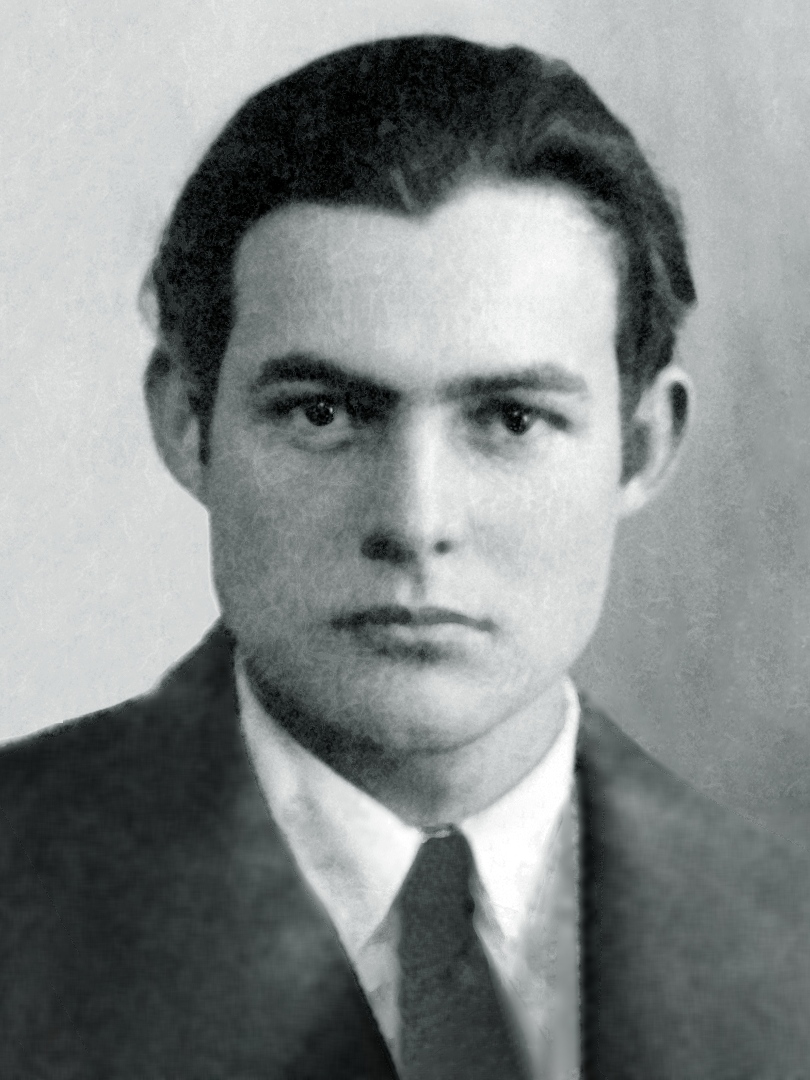
Ernest Hemingway in 1923

"The Doctor and the Doctor's Wife" is a short story by Ernest Hemingway, published in the 1925 New York edition of In Our Time, by Boni & Liveright. The story is the second in the collection to feature Nick Adams, Hemingway's autobiographical alter ego. "The Doctor and the Doctor's Wife" follows "Indian Camp" in the collection, includes elements of the same style and themes, yet is written in counterpoint to the first story.

== Background and publication ==
During his youth in Chicago, Ernest Hemingway's family spent summers at Windemere on Walloon Lake, near Petoskey, Michigan. Hemingway's father, who was a doctor, taught him to hunt, fish, and camp in the woods and lakes of Northern Michigan as a young boy.

In 1921, Hemingway married Hadley Richardson and was posted to Paris a few months later as international correspondent for The Toronto Star. In Paris he befriended Gertrude Stein, Ezra Pound, F. Scott Fitzgerald, James Joyce, Ford Madox Ford, and John Dos Passos. Pound's influence extended to promoting the young author; in 1923 he commissioned work from Hemingway for the modernist series Pound was editing. In 1924, during one of Hemingway's most productive periods, he wrote eight short stories, including "The Doctor and the Doctor's Wife". The stories were combined with the earlier vignettes produced for Pound, and submitted for publication to Boni & Liveright in New York, who accepted the work in March 1925.

The story was included in Hemingway's collection The Fifth Column and the First Forty-Nine Stories published in October 1938, and in two collections of short stories published after his death, The Nick Adams Stories (1972) and The Complete Short Stories of Ernest Hemingway: The Finca Vigía Edition (1987).

== Plot summary ==
Nick Adams' father, Dr. Adams, hires a crew of Native Americans to remove the four large beech logs from the lake's log boom that drifted up on his beach. Dick Boulton, his son Eddy, and Billy Tabeshaw, come through the back gate from the woods, bringing cant hooks, axes and a crosscut saw to cut the logs into cord wood. Boulton compliments Dr. Adams on the timber he is stealing from the logging company; Dr. Adams asserts that the logs are driftwood. Boulton washes a log in the surf, uncovers its mark and tells the doctor it belongs to White and McNally. The doctor becomes uncomfortable, decides not to saw up the logs, but Boulton says it makes no difference to him who the logs are stolen from. The two men engage in a verbal exchange, and when the doctor threatens Boulton with violence, Boulton mocks him.

The doctor leaves the beach in anger, walking back to his cottage. He goes to his bedroom, sits on his bed, and stares with anger at a pile of medical journals still in their wrappers. In the adjacent room his wife lies on her bed with a Bible, a copy of Mary Baker Eddy's Science and Health with Key to the Scriptures, and an issue of the Christian Science Quarterly. She asks whether he is going back to work; he explains that he had an altercation with Boulton. She asks whether he lost his temper and quotes Scripture, while, in the next room, the doctor sits on his bed and cleans his gun, pushing shells in and out of the magazine. When she presses him about the nature of the dispute he tells her Boulton owes for having his wife treated for pneumonia and does not want to have to work for the doctor. She expresses her disbelief of the explanation and the doctor leaves the house. His wife calls after him to send Nick to her. The doctor finds Nick sitting under a tree, reading a book. Nick tells his father he wants to go with him and suggests they go into the woods to find black squirrels.

== Writing style ==
Hemingway was inspired by Ezra Pound's writings and applied the principles of imagism to his own work. Pound's influence can be seen in the stripped-down, minimalist style characteristic in Hemingway's early fiction. Betraying his admiration for the older writer, he admitted that Pound "taught [me] more about how to write and how not to write than any son of a bitch alive". He also learned from James Joyce, who further instilled the idea of stripped down economic prose. Hemingway's short stories from the 1920s adhere to Pound's tight definition of imagism; biographer Carlos Baker writes that in his short stories Hemingway tried to learn how to "get the most from the least, [to] prune language, [to] multiply intensities, [to] tell nothing but the truth in a way that allowed for telling more than the truth". Hemingway adapted this style into a technique he called his iceberg theory: as Baker describes it, the hard facts float above water while the supporting structure, including the symbolism, operates out of sight.

== Themes and structure ==
The story is a companion to "Indian Camp", the previous story in the collection, which also features Nick Adams and his father Dr. Adams. Unlike "Indian Camp", where Dr. Adams is shown in a position of power, in this story he is a cowardly man who reacts to confrontation with repressed anger. In "Indian Camp" young Nick witnesses his father performing a caesarian; Dr. Adams exposes his young son to childbirth and, unintentionally, to violent death – an experience that causes Nick to equate childbirth with death. Howard Hannum explains the trauma of birth and suicide Hemingway paints in "Indian Camp" rendered a leitmotif that gave Hemingway a unified framework for the Nick Adams stories and is continued in "The Doctor and the Doctor's Wife" in direct counterpoint to the previous story.

The contrasts and similarities between the two stories are stark. In "The Doctor and the Doctor's Wife" the family lives in a spacious cottage, whereas in "Indian Camp" a family lives in a cramped shanty. The first is filled with silences, the second with violent screams. In this story, three men come from the Indian camp to the Adams's cottage; in the previous, Dr. Adams, Nick and his uncle visit the Indian camp. The central scenes of both stories occur indoors and involve sick women in bed; both women are married to unhappy, suicidal men (the husband in "Indian Camp" commits suicide in his bed with a razor; Dr. Adams sits on his bed and plays with his gun). Both stories end with Nick and his father leaving – rowing away from the Indian camp in the first, walking into the woods to hunt in this story.

== Sources ==
- Baker, Carlos (1972). Hemingway: The Writer as Artist. Princeton: Princeton UP. ISBN 978-0-691-01305-3
- Benson, Jackson (1975). "Ernest Hemingway as Short Story Writer". in Benson, Jackson (ed). The Short Stories of Ernest Hemingway: Critical Essays. Durham NC: Duke University Press. ISBN 978-0-8223-0320-6
- Benson, Jackson. (1983). "Patterns of Connections and their development in Hemingway's In Our Time". In Reynolds, Michael. (ed). Critical essays on Ernest Hemingway's In Our Time. Boston: G. K. Hall. ISBN 978-0-8161-8637-2
- Beegel, Susan (2000). "Eye and Heart: Hemingway's Education as a Naturalist". in Wagner-Martin, Linda (ed). A Historical Guide to Ernest Hemingway. New York: Oxford UP. ISBN 978-0-19-512152-0
- Cohen, Milton. (2003). "Who Commissioned The Little Review's 'In Our Time'?". The Hemingway Review. Vol. 23, No. 1.
- Hannum, Howard. (2001). "'Scared sick looking at it': A Reading of Nick Adams in the Published Stories". Twentieth Century Literature. Vol. 47, No. 1. 92–113
- Meyers, Jeffrey (1985). Hemingway: A Biography. New York: Macmillan. ISBN 978-0-333-42126-0
- Oliver, Charles. (1999). Ernest Hemingway A to Z: The Essential Reference to the Life and Work. New York: Checkmark Publishing. ISBN 978-0-8160-3467-3
- Reynolds, Michael. (1995). Hemingway's 'In Our Time': The biography of a Book. In Kennedy, Gerald J. (ed). Modern American Short Story Sequences. Cambridge: Cambridge University Press. ISBN 978-0-521-43010-4
- Strong, Paul. (1991). "The First Nick Adams Stories". Studies in Short Fiction. Vol. 28, No. 1. 83–91
- Tetlow, Wendolyn E. (1992). Hemingway's "In Our Time": Lyrical Dimensions. Cranbury NJ: Associated University Presses. ISBN 978-0-8387-5219-7
