= Ernest and Mary Hemingway House =

Historic house in Idaho, United States

- Ernest and Mary Hemingway House and Preserve
- U.S. National Register of Historic Places
- Location: Ketchum, Idaho, U.S.
- Area: 14 acres (5.7 ha)
- Built: 1953; 73 years ago
- NRHP reference No.: 13001073
- Added to NRHP: March 13, 2015

The Ernest and Mary Hemingway House, in Ketchum, Idaho, is listed on the National Register of Historic Places in 2015. The National Register does not disclose its location but rather lists it as "Address restricted." The house itself is private, and not open to the public. Visitors to the house are permitted on an invitation-only basis.

== Description ==
The house, and its associated 13.9 acres of land alongside the Big Wood River, is located in Ketchum, Idaho. It is listed on the National Register of Historic Places for its association with the writer and as an example of mid-century architecture. The house still contains Hemingway's personal possessions and furniture.

The house is incorporated into a larger historical and literary program that explores Hemingway's lasting connections to the region, a place he visited for two decades, and the place where he turned to make his final home after his departure from Cuba.

Artifacts from the Ernest and Mary Hemingway House and Preserve are being preserved by the Jeanne Rodger Lane Center for Regional History and will be made accessible to the public through periodic displays at the Library and the Wood River Museum of History and Culture, as well as through research requests.

== History ==
The house was built 73 years ago in 1953 for Henry J. "Bob" Topping Jr., who commissioned the house for his new wife Mona Moedl. It cost $100,000 to build. It is a two-story, 2,500-square-foot (230 m^{2}) home in Ketchum, west of the Big Wood River. The property is the last undeveloped property of its size within the city limits of Ketchum. Similar to the Sun Valley Lodge a few miles away, its exterior walls are concrete, poured into rough-sawn forms and then acid-stained to simulate wood. It was sold to Hemingway in 1959 for its asking price of $50,000, and the Hemingways occupied it in November 1959. The Toppings' were willing to sell the home for a low price because they wanted to move to Arizona for health reasons.

On the morning of Sunday, July 2, 1961, Hemingway died in the home of a self-inflicted head wound from a shotgun. After a brief funeral four days later, he was buried at the city cemetery.

The Nature Conservancy acquired ownership in 1986. It was given to the conservancy by Mary Hemingway upon her death. Her terms prevented the house from being operated as a museum. The conservancy used it as a field office until their operation outgrew it.

=== Community Library's stewardship of the Hemingway House ===
In May 2017, ownership was transferred to The Community Library in Ketchum, a privately funded public library.

Since taking over the management of the house, the Library undertook restoration measures to the house's exterior and interior. Notably, the roof was re-shingled from shake back to shingle (with a Class A assembly); the house's exterior trim was repainted; the original gravel drive was partially regraded; a new boiler was installed, and several dying trees were removed.

During the renovation, eleven picture windows in the living room, bedrooms, and kitchen were replaced with UV-protected double-paned glass to protect the artifacts within the house against UV light damage. This project was made possible by a grant award from the Idaho Heritage Trust.

== The Hemingway Writer-in-Residence Program ==
The Community Library manages a Writer-in-Residence program to provide a contemplative retreat for individuals aligned with the Library's programs, major initiatives, and community partnerships.

== A Writer in New Country: Hemingway in 1939 ==
An exhibit at the Wood River Museum of History and Culture in Ketchum, Idaho, examines Hemingway's personal life, career and interests at the time when he arrived in 1939.

== See also ==
- Birthplace of Ernest Hemingway
- Ernest Hemingway House, Key West, Florida
- Frank Lloyd Wright Prairie School of Architecture Historic District
- Pfeiffer House and Carriage House
- Spear-O-Wigwam Ranch, a Wyoming dude ranch with "Hemingway Cabin" where Hemingway wrote Farewell to Arms
- Windemere, childhood family summer cottage on Walloon Lake, in Michigan, NRHP-listed in 1979
- Hemingway - film by Ken Burns, 2021
