= Grace Hall Hemingway =

American opera singer and painter (1872–1951)

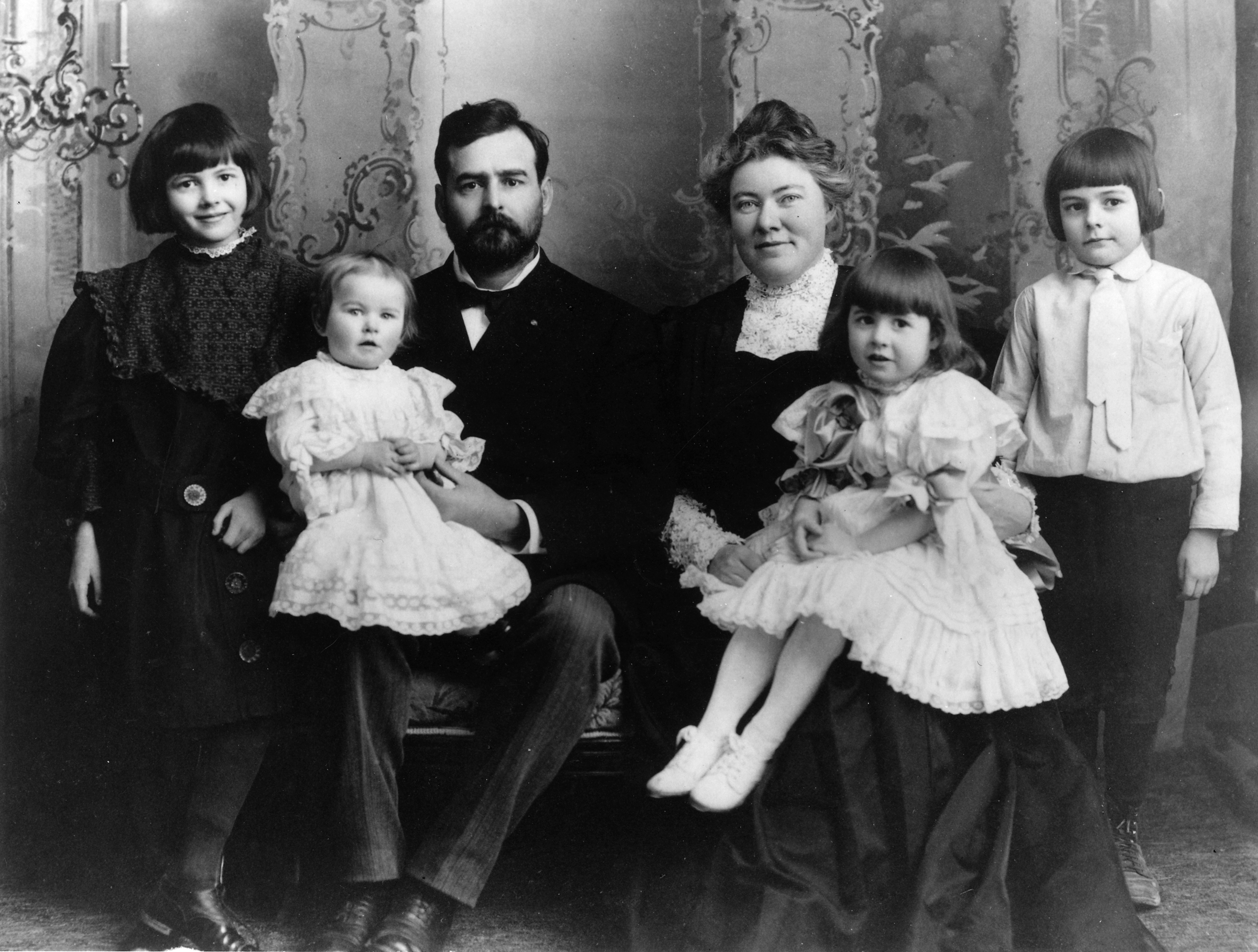
- The Hemingway family in 1905 (from the left): Marcelline, Madelaine ("Sunny"), Clarence, Grace, Ursula, and Ernest
- Born: Grace Ernestine Hall; June 15, 1872; Chicago, Illinois, U.S.
- Died: June 28, 1951 (aged 79); Memphis, Tennessee, U.S.
- Burial place: Forest Home Cemetery
- Occupations: Opera singer, music teacher, composer, painter
- Spouse: Clarence Edmonds Hemingway (m. 1896; died 1928)
- Children: 6, including Ernest and Leicester

Grace Ernestine Hemingway (née Hall; June 15, 1872 – June 28, 1951) was an American opera singer, music teacher, and painter. She was Ernest Hemingway's mother.

== Early life ==
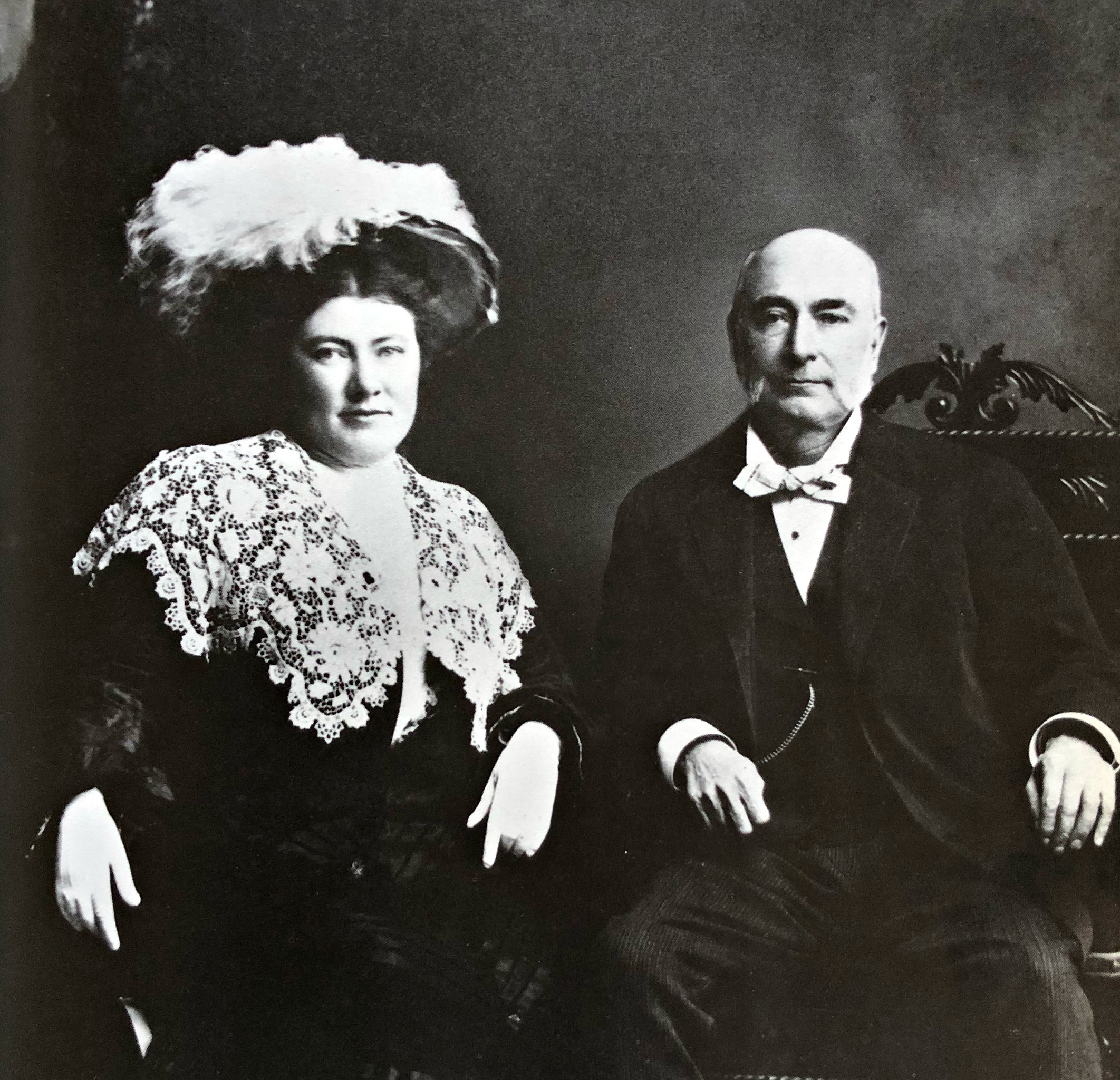
Grace and Ernest Hall, c 1895

Grace Ernestine Hall was born on June 15, 1872, in Chicago. She was the daughter of wealthy merchant Ernest Miller Hall (1840—1905) and Caroline Hancock (1843—1895), both natives of England, Hall being the great-grandson of musician Edward Miller. A younger brother, Leicester, was born in 1874. Hall studied the violin, piano and took voice lessons when she was young. In 1886, her family moved to Oak Park, where she attended Oak Park High School and first met her future husband, Clarence Edmonds 'Ed' Hemingway (1871—1928).

In 1889, Caroline and Ernest Hall purchased a lot on North Oak Park Avenue. While living in a rental house nearby, the couple supervised construction of their new home, designed by architect Wesley Arnold. The Hall house was completed in 1890 and located at 449 Oak Park Avenue (Note: The house is currently numbered 339 North Oak Park Avenue.) The Victorian, three-story house, across the street from the Hemingway family house, consisted of first and second floors with six bedrooms and a bathroom. Their home had running water, and it was the first house in Oak Park to have electricity.

Hall and Clarence Hemingway became close friends during her mother's illness from cancer in 1894. Hemingway was the new medical assistant to Dr. William Lewis, the Hall's family doctor, and made frequent house calls to visit Caroline Hall, during which he was a source of emotional support for Grace as her mother's health deteriorated. Caroline Hall died on September 5, 1895. By then, Hall and Hemingway's friendship had grown into a romantic relationship.

In the fall of 1895, Hall went to New York City to study with Luisa Cappiani—a well-known opera coach—and, in 1896, she debuted as a talented contralto with the Apollo-Club in Madison Square Garden. She later was offered a contract by the Metropolitan Opera but turned it down for two reasons: her eyes, weakened from a childhood illness, could not tolerate the bright stage lighting, and she was greatly influenced by Hemingway's many letters, imploring her to return to Oak Park.

== Family and career ==
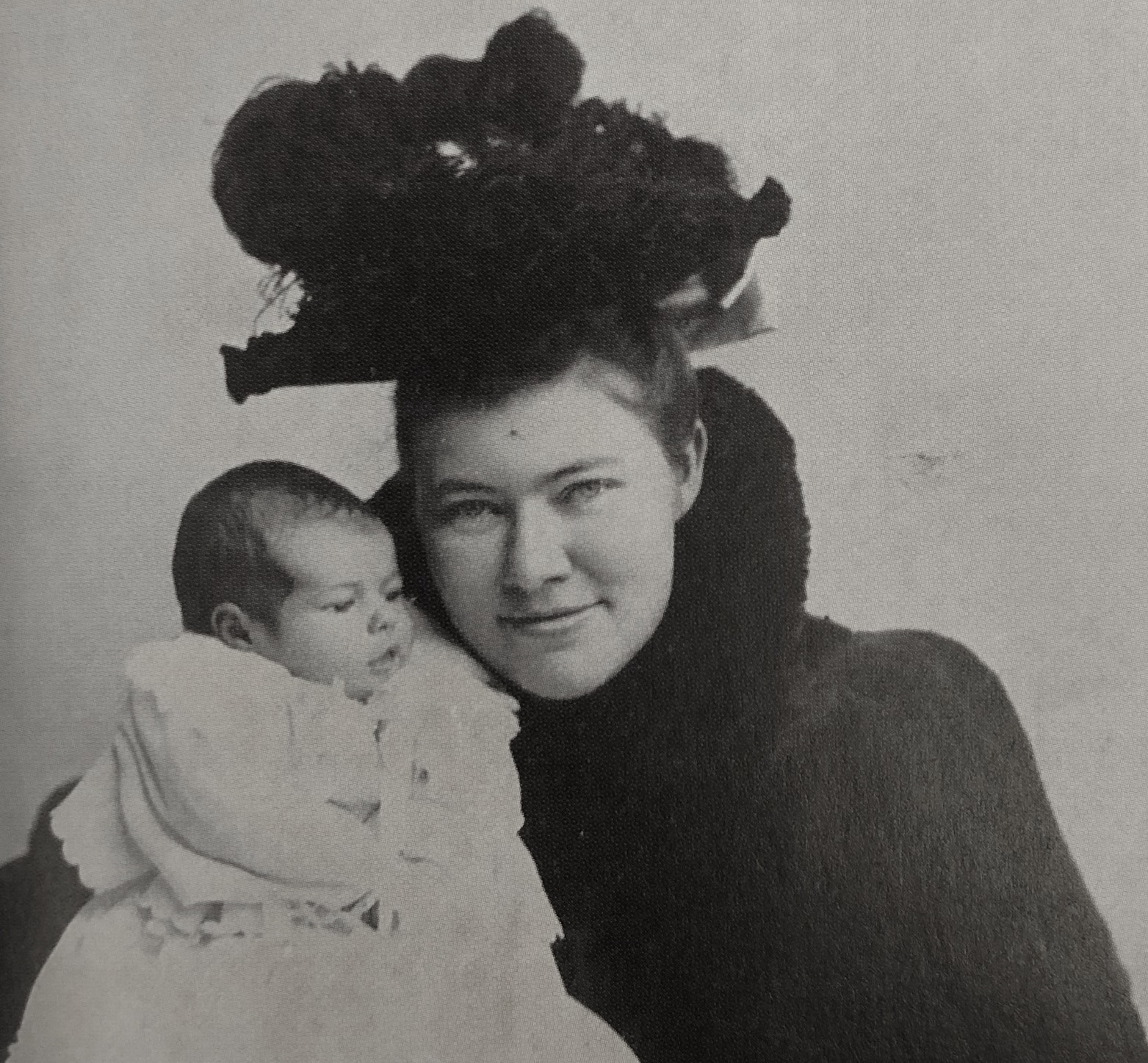
Ernest and Grace Hemingway, 1899

On October 1, 1896, Hall married Clarence Hemingway. The couple moved into Ernest Hall's large home. At the time of her marriage, Hall Hemingway had over 50 voice pupils and gave music and voice lessons, wrote sheet music, and directed the children's church choir and the orchestra at the First Congregational Church of Oak Park. She also sang in concerts, and she was a soloist with the church choir. She earned more money from her music lessons than her husband did as a doctor. According to her daughter Marcelline, she was earning up to $1,000 per month at one point, while her husband, just starting in his profession, was bringing in $50 per month.

The Hall house is the birthplace of the three oldest Hemingway children: Marcelline in 1898, Ernest in 1899, and Ursula in 1902. Madelaine (Sunny) was born in 1904 at their Walloon Lake cottage in Michigan. All the Hemingway children were delivered by their father. Their mother did not participate in the domestic chores in the Hemingway household, but their father often cooked, planned meals, helped with laundry and did seasonal canning. Live-in maids and nannies performed most of the housekeeping, cooking and care of the children.

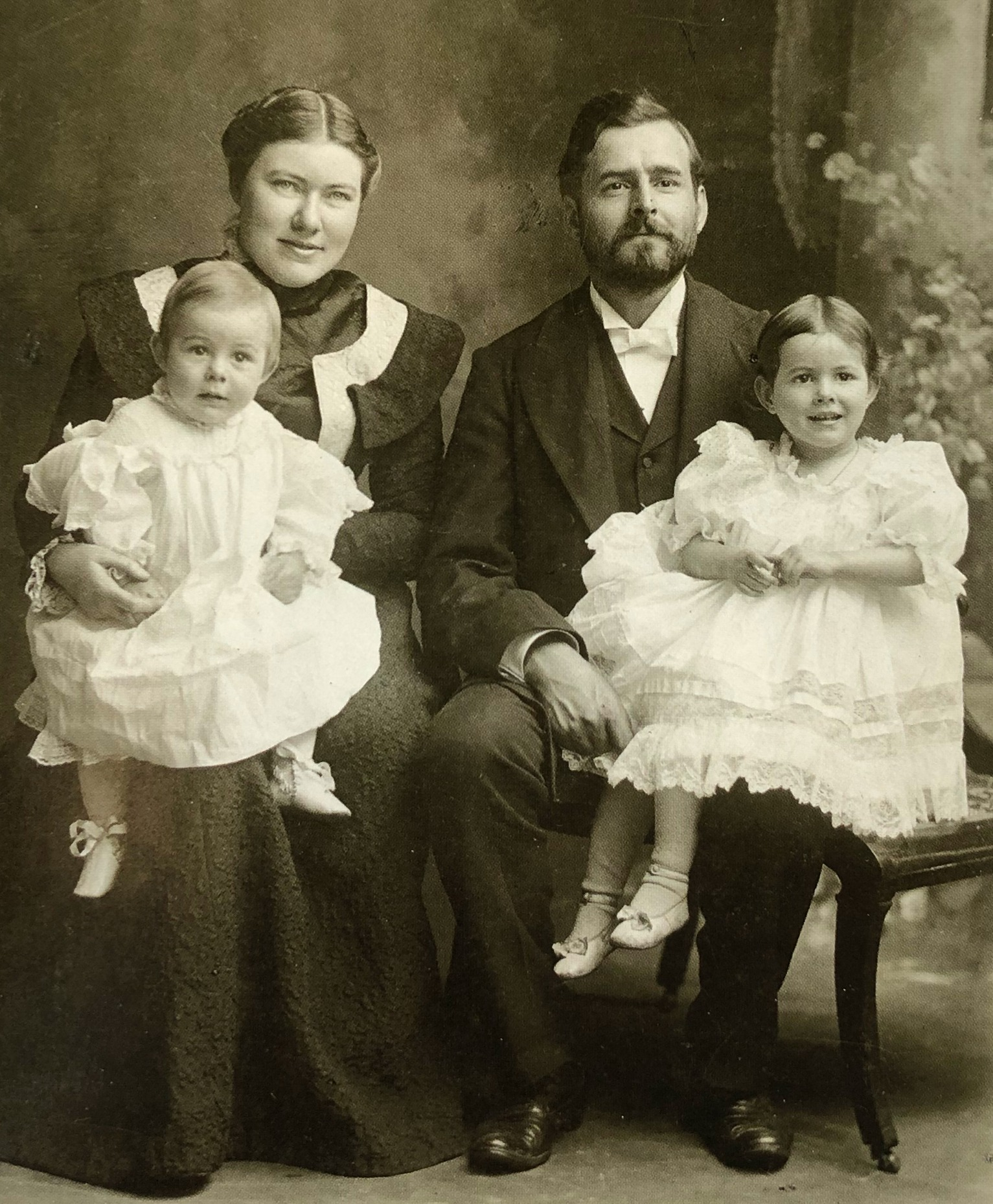
The Hemingway family, 1900

Hall Hemingway focused her maternal energy on encouraging and inspiring her children in the cultural world of literature, art, poetry and music. She read hundreds of books to her children when they were young and taught them songs and poetry. She took her children to the opera, theater, and museums in nearby Chicago. She insisted that all of her children learn to play a musical instrument. The girls were encouraged to play the violin and piano, and Ernest was assigned the cello. The Hemingway family spent their summers at their family cottage in Walloon Lake, Michigan. Their father was an excellent outdoorsman who introduced the Hemingway children to swimming, camping, fishing, hiking, and hunting. Their mother enjoyed their summer trips, was often outdoors with the family, and was comfortable using both a fishing pole and a rifle. She later designed and had built a small cottage across the lake from the main cottage. She often rowed from the large family cottage to the smaller cottage to spend quiet days on her own.

Ernest's grandfather died in May 1905, leaving his home to his daughter Grace. By October, she had sold the house to Samuel Nissen, an Oak Park grocer. She bought a lot on Kenilworth avenue and made sketches for a new, much larger house. With these sketches, the architect designed a three-story, eight-bedroom stucco home for the family, with a large music studio for herself and an office for her husband to see medical patients. Their last two children were born at the new house: Carol in 1911 and Leicester in 1915, when she was age 42.

== Grace and Ernest ==
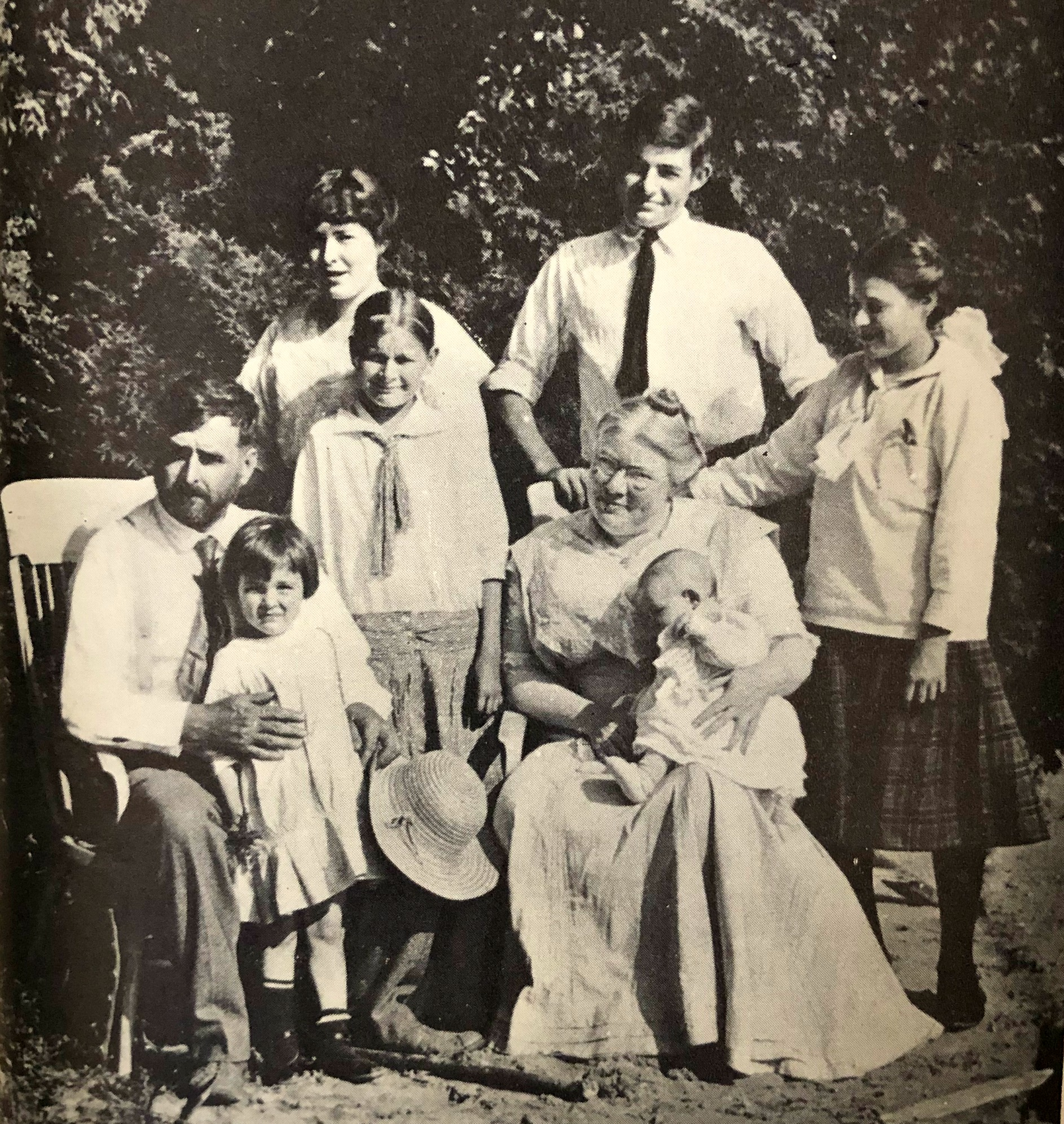
The Hemingway family, c. 1915

Ernest Hemingway had a difficult relationship with his mother, beginning in his teen years. She asserted her authority over every Hemingway family member, including her husband. She put many demands on her children, insisting they participate in activities that were important to her. As Ernest matured as a young man, he often chafed under her rules, intent on exploring sports, hobbies and activities that interested him. He started refusing to do as she bade, which caused conflicts between mother and son. Clarence was often away from home for long periods of time, and his depression caused him to withdraw from the family, which made things more difficult for Ernest during his teens.

Writers, historians, and Ernest's friends have discussed his difficult relationship with his mother at length. Bernice Kert states: "It has also been said that Ernest's lifelong assertion of masculine power grew out of his emotional need to exorcise the painful memory of his mother asserting her superiority over his father." Major General Charles Lanham, a friend of Ernest, said that he was the only man he knew who really hated his mother.

== Later years ==
Hall Hemingway was an active member of the Suburban Civics and Equal Suffrage Club in Oak Park during the era of the New Woman movement (1890–1920), with women's suffrage as a national issue.

In 1924, at the age of 52, she began to paint and attended classes at the Art Institute of Chicago and other art schools. She studied art for two years. In an interview in the April 1937 issue of Artistry Magazine, she claimed to have painted over 600 pictures, mainly landscapes. Hall Hemingway belonged to the Oak Park Art League, serving as its director for six years.

Clarence Hemingway suffered from deteriorating health in the 1920s, both physical and mental. He died from a self-inflicted gunshot wound in 1928. Ernest blamed his mother for his death. According to author John Raeburn, "In the Hemingway household, her imperious presence and propensity for self-dramatization contrasted with her husband's irritable remoteness. Ernest, frightened by his father's bewildering behavior, identified its cause as his mother's overbearingness. That was unjust, but he never relinquished the conviction, and it echoed in several of his stories."

Hall Hemingway was 56 at the time of her husband's death, but still had two children to support and educate, Carol and Leicester. She rented part of her home to help pay for Carol's education. Ernest and his second wife Pauline set up a trust fund for his mother to help support her for the remainder of her life. In gratitude for his generosity, she deeded the family's summer cottage to Ernest.

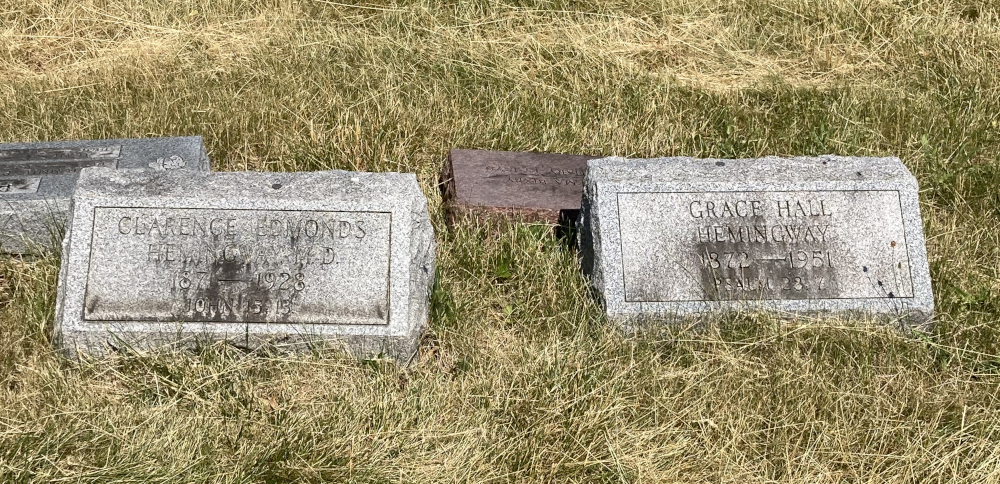
Graves of Clarence Edmonds and Grace Hall Hemingway at Forest Home Cemetery

Learning to drive for the first time, Hall Hemingway took driving trips to Florida to sketch and paint. She sold her large home in 1936 and moved into a smaller home in the nearby village of River Forest, Illinois. She carried on painting and began teaching painting lessons while still teaching voice lessons for several years.

Hall Hemingway lived for 23 years on her own after her husband's death. She died in Memphis, Tennessee, in 1951. She was buried alongside Clarence at Forest Home Cemetery in Forest Park, Illinois.

== Sources ==
=== Books ===
- Cassin, Virginia (1997). The Ernest Hemingway Foundation of Oak Park Volunteer Manual. Oak Park, Illinois: The Ernest Hemingway Foundation.
- Hemingway, Leicester (1962). "Chapter 1". My Brother, Ernest Hemingway (hardcover) (1st ed.). London: Weidenfeld and Nicolson. p. 20. "These were the people who molded our parents, Grace Ernestine Hall and Clarence Edmunds Hemingway, in the Victorian tradition."
- Howes, Durward; Braun, Mary L.; Garvey, Rose, eds. (1937). "Hemingway, Grace Hall". American Women: the Official Who's Who among the Women of the Nation, 1937–1938 (hardcover). Vol. II. Los Angeles, California: American Publications.
- Kert, Bernice (1983). The Hemingway Women: Those Who Loved Him — The Wives and Others. W.W. Norton & Company. ISBN 978-0-393-31835-7.
- Moddelmog, Debra A.; del Gizzo, Suzanne, eds. (2012). Ernest Hemingway in Context (softcover). New York, New York: Cambridge University Press. ISBN 978-1-107-42931-4.
  - Justice, Hilary K. (2012). "Chapter 19. Music". Ernest Hemingway in Context (softcover). New York, New York: Cambridge University Press. pp. 193–203. ISBN 978-1-107-42931-4.
  - Comley, Nancy R. (2012). "Chapter 42. Women". Ernest Hemingway in Context (softcover). New York, New York: Cambridge University Press. pp. 409–417. ISBN 978-1-107-42931-4.
- Sanford, Marcelline Hemingway (1961). At the Hamingways: A Family Portrait. Boston: Little, Brown and Company.
- Wagner-Martin, Linda, ed. (2000). A Historical Guide to Ernest Hemingway (softcover). New York, New York: Oxford University Press. ISBN 978-0-19-512152-0.
  - Reynolds, Michael (2000). "Ernest Hemingway, 1899–1961: A Brief Biography". A Historical Guide to Ernest Hemingway (softcover). New York, New York: Oxford University Press. pp. 15–52. ISBN 978-0-19-512152-0.

=== Websites ===
- "Where Hemingway Story Begins". The Hemingway Foundation of Oak Park.
- Sanford, John E. (2003). "Grace Hall Hemingway's Painting Tour of the Southwest". californiadesertart.com. California Desert Art.
- Hall, Rick. "Ancestry of Ernest Hemingway". famouskin.com. Ernest Hemingway Genealogy - Family Group | Edward Miller | Ahnentafel No: 52 (17292).
