= Birthplace of Ernest Hemingway =

House in Oak Park, Illinois

Ernest Hemingway Birthplace
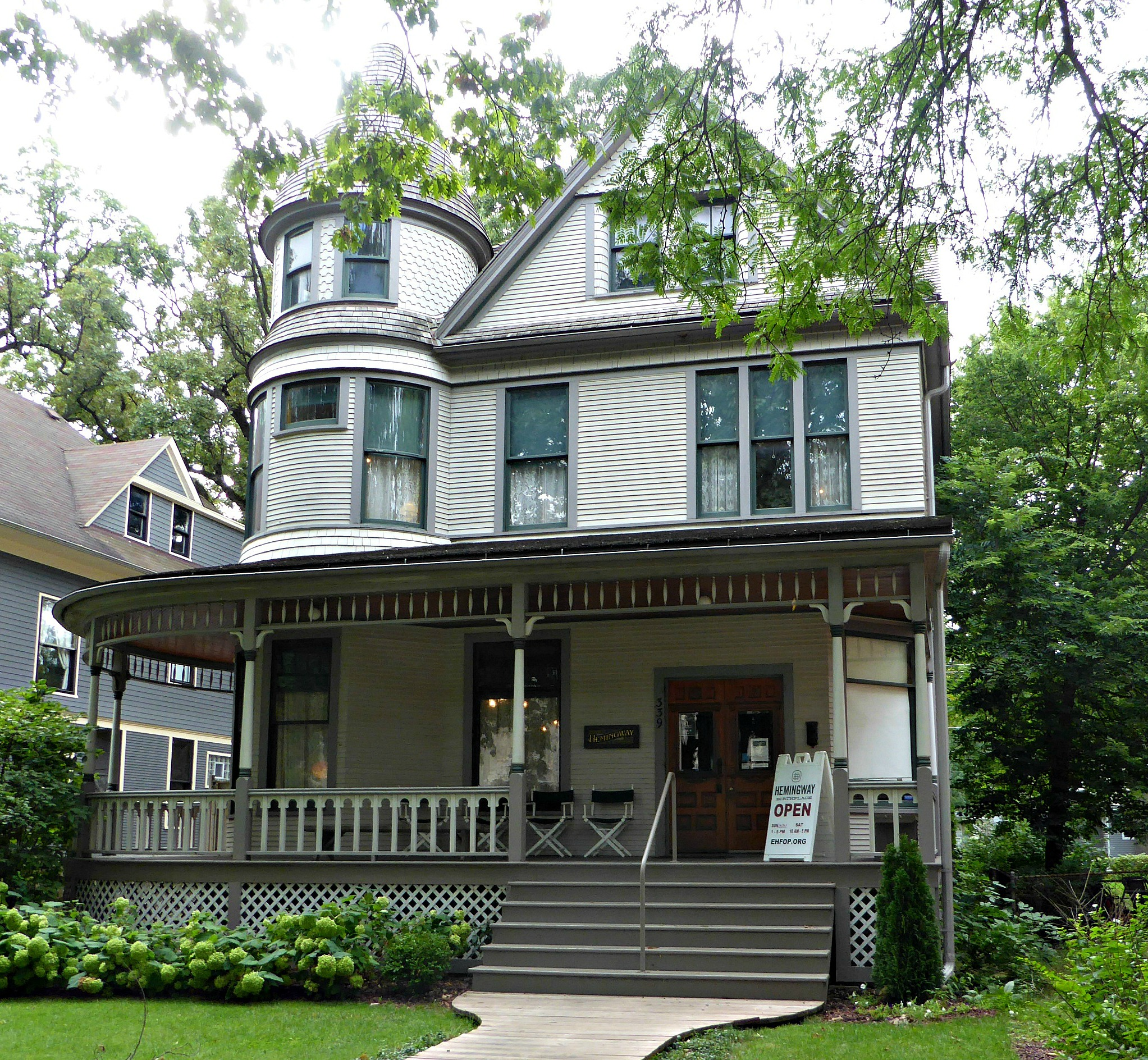
- Interactive map of Ernest Hemingway Birthplace
- Location: Oak Park, Illinois, United States
- Coordinates: 41.892778°N 87.795081°W
- Built: 1890
- Architect: Wesley Arnold

The Ernest Hemingway Birthplace is a historic Queen Anne home and museum in Oak Park, Illinois, United States, where American author Ernest Hemingway was born. Hemingway lived in the home with his family for the first six years of his life. The house was sold out of the Hemingway family in 1905, and it was subsequently renovated and converted into a multi-family residence.

In December 1992, the house was purchased by the Ernest Hemingway Foundation of Oak Park. The foundation oversaw a major restoration that used photographs and descriptions of the house to return it to its original condition. Since 2001, the building has been maintained as a Hemingway museum, with the foundation offering guided tours of the house.

== History ==
Hemingway was born in Oak Park, Illinois, on July 21, 1899, in a home built by Hemingway's maternal grandparents, Caroline (Note: Caroline died in the home on September 5, 1895. Grace and Dr. Clarence Hemingway became close friends after young Dr. Hemingway started visiting the house during her mother's long illness with cancer.) and Ernest Hall. (Note: Ernest Miller Hemingway was named after his maternal grandfather, Ernest Hall, and his grandfather Hall's brother, Miller Hall.) Hemingway was the second child and first son of Dr. Clarence and Grace Hemingway. He lived in the Hall house for the first six years of his life with his parents, maternal grandfather, and three sisters. The house, currently numbered 339 North Oak Park Avenue, was the first home in Oak Park to have electricity. Across the street from the Hall home was the two-story, white clapboard home of Hemingway's paternal grandparents, Anson and Adelaide Hemingway.

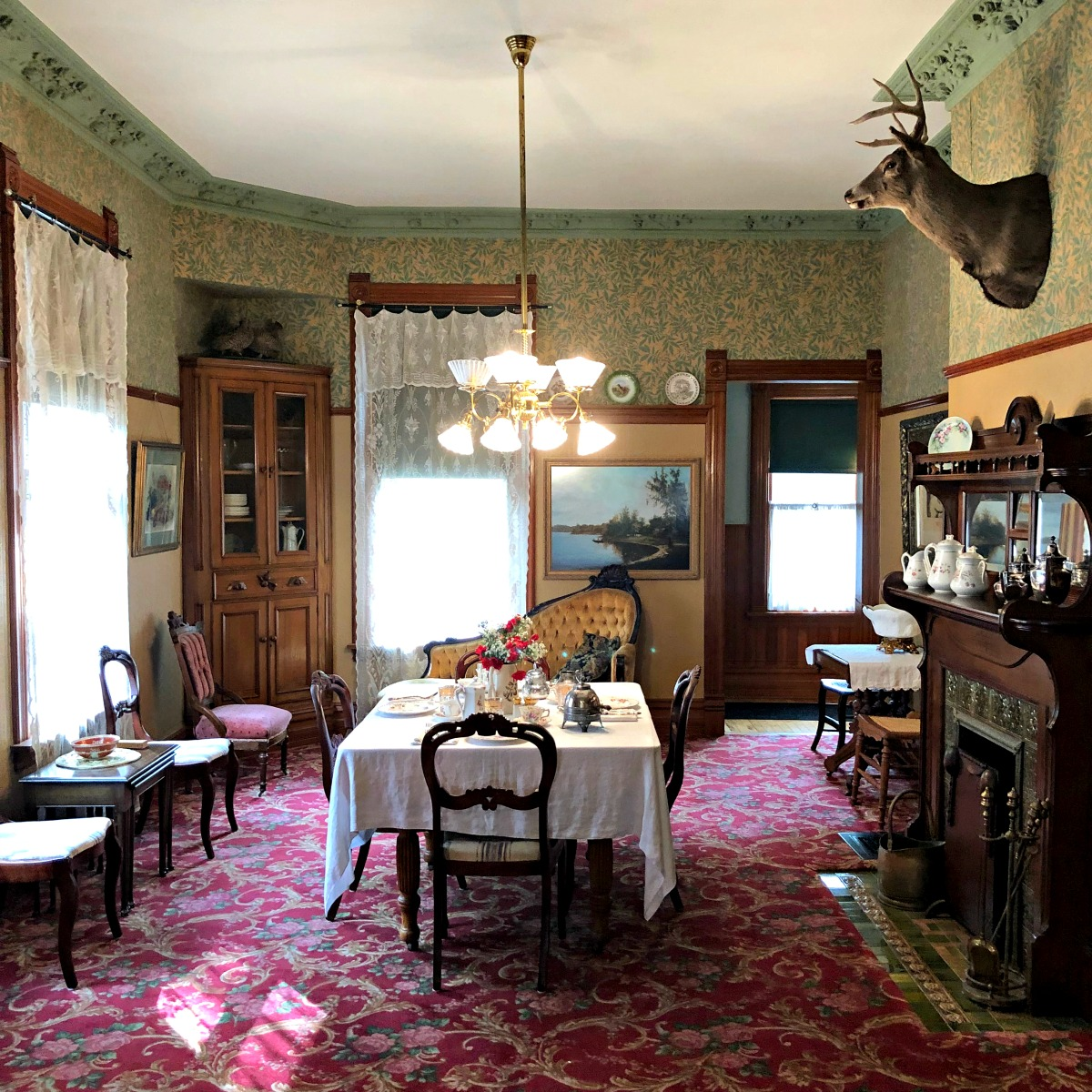
Dining room

Grandfather Hall, known to the Hemingway children as Abba, was a much-loved family member. In later life, Marcelline Hemingway Sanford, Ernest's older sister, would write about Abba Hall, recalling his kindness, generosity, and entertaining stories that were a delight to young Marcelline and Ernest. Grace's maternal uncle, Tyley Hancock was a frequent visitor to the family home. He would often entertain the children with adventurous stories from his youth and from his travels as a salesman for the Hall family's wholesale cutlery business.

Hemingway's mother Grace, was an operatic singer, voice teacher, and composer. She earned money for the young family by teaching music and voice lessons. Hemingway's father, Clarence, a medical doctor, delivered three of the Hemingway children in an upstairs bedroom of the home. He would consult with medical patients in a small office between the first and second floors. According to Sanford, "It was to the office that Ernest and I were called for punishment when we misbehaved."

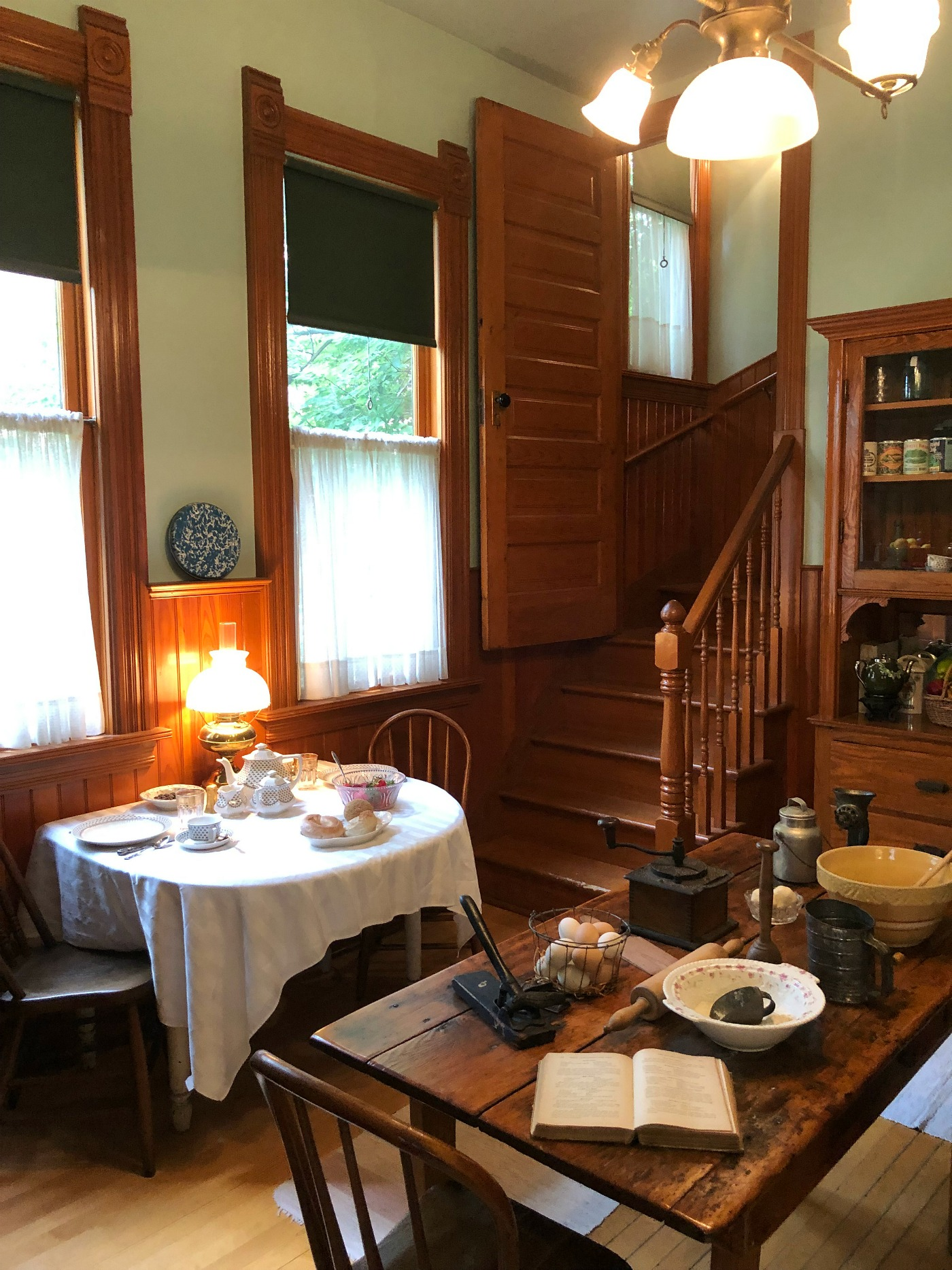
Kitchen

Ernest's grandfather died in May 1905, leaving the home to his daughter, Grace. By October, Grace had sold the house to Samuel Nissen, an Oak Park grocer. The Nissen family lived in the North Oak Park Avenue house for fifteen years, replacing the front porch with a screened-in porch in 1914 and later replacing the clapboard exterior with aluminum siding. During the 1920s through the 1940s, the house was converted into a rooming house. The larger living areas and hall were divided and a bathroom was installed on the first floor. In 1951, the house was remodeled again to create a two-family residence.

The house was purchased by The Ernest Hemingway Foundation of Oak Park (EHFOP) in December 1992. The foundation embarked on a major renovation, using Sanford's description of her grandfather's home. The Ernest Hemingway birthplace was restored to its original 1890s layout, with Victorian period furnishings and original Hemingway family heirlooms. In 2001, the Ernest Hemingway Birthplace Museum was opened to the public. Since 2016, the EHFOP has published Hemingway Shorts, a literary journal in the tradition of Ernest Hemingway. Notable contributors include Michael McGuire, Jinwoo Chong, Sean Gill, and Veryan Williams-Wynn.

== Description ==
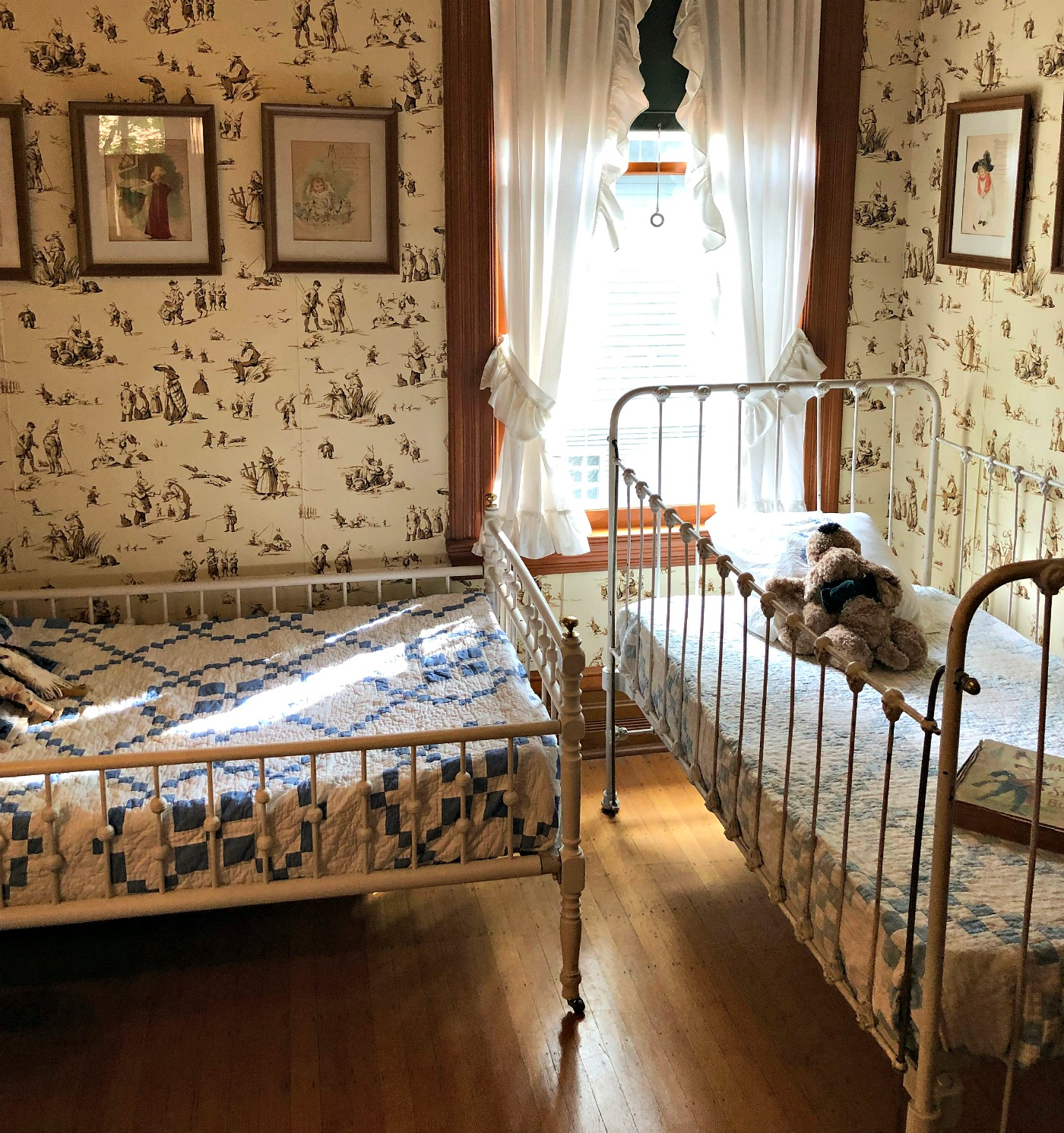
Children's nursery

Hemingway's maternal grandparents, Caroline and Ernest Hall, built the house in 1890 on land they purchased in November 1889. The architect was Wesley Arnold. The Victorian three-story house consisted of first and second floors, a basement, and an attic. The house exterior had wooden clapboard siding with a shingle roof. The house was initially painted gray with darker gray trim. The window trim was a dark green. There was a large open wrap-around porch with open railings that covered the front of the house and the turret on the southeast corner. There was a small open porch in the back that provided access to the kitchen.

On the first floor was an entrance hall with a formal stairway leading to the second floor. There was a long parlor to the left of the hall with a bay window facing the street. The parlor led into the formal dining room. Next to the dining room and parlor was a small library, where Hemingway's grandfather and great-uncle Tyley Hancock would smoke and drink wine after their evening meal. There were oak floors and yellow pine woodwork throughout most of the house, both stained a medium brown.

Water lines had been installed along Oak Park Avenue before the house was built, making it possible for the house to have running water. The kitchen was a small dark room behind the dining room, with a door leading to the back porch, a stairway leading down to the cellar, and a back stairway to the second floor for the servants. There were six bedrooms and a bathroom on the second floor. The Hemingway babies would sleep with their mother until they were old enough for the children's nursery. Hemingway and his older sister Marcelline shared the nursery when they were toddlers, sleeping in identical, white cribs with spindles.

== See also ==
- Ernest and Mary Hemingway House, Ketchum, Idaho
- Ernest Hemingway Cottage, Walloon Lake, Michigan
- Ernest Hemingway House
- List of residences of American writers

== Bibliography ==
- Baker, Carlos (1969). Ernest Hemingway: A Life Story. Charles Scribner's Sons. ISBN 978-0002112253.
- Cassin, Virginia (1997). The Ernest Hemingway Foundation of Oak Park Volunteer Manual. Oak Park, Illinois: The Ernest Hemingway Foundation.
- Elder, Robert; Vetch, Aaron; Cirino, Mark (2016). Hidden Hemingway: Inside the Ernest Hemingway Archives of Oak Park. Kent, Ohio: The Kent State University Press. ISBN 978-1606352731.
- Sanford, Marcelline Hemingway (1961). At the Hemingways: A Family Portrait. Boston: Little, Brown and Company.
