= Spear-O-Wigwam Ranch =

- U.S. National Register of Historic Places
- U.S. Historic district
- Location within Wyoming Location within the United States
- Location: Jct. of Coffeen Park & Spear-O-Wigwam Rds., Story Johnson County, Wyoming
- Coordinates: 44.5510433°N 107.2104961°W
- Area: 15 acres (6.1 ha)
- Architectural style: Vernacular dude ranch
- NRHP reference No.: 16000053
- Added to NRHP: February 23, 2016

The Spear-O-Wigwam Ranch is a former dude ranch, now a campus of Sheridan College, Wyoming, the Spear-O-Wigwam Mountain Campus. It was listed on the National Register of Historic Places in 2016. It is located at the southeast end of Park Reservoir, about two miles north of Cloud Peak Wilderness Area at altitude of 8,300 feet (2,500 m).

It closed as a dude ranch in 2011.

One of its log guest cabins is known as the "Hemingway Cabin", where Ernest Hemingway stayed in 1928 with his wife Pauline while writing A Farewell to Arms. The cabin is approximately 42 by 18 feet (12.8 m × 5.5 m).

== See also ==
- 4 Lazy F Dude Ranch, also NRHP-listed in Grand Teton National Park, Wyoming
