= Ernest Hemingway Cottage =

Historic house in Michigan, United States

- U.S. National Register of Historic Places
- U.S. National Historic Landmark
- Michigan State Historic Site
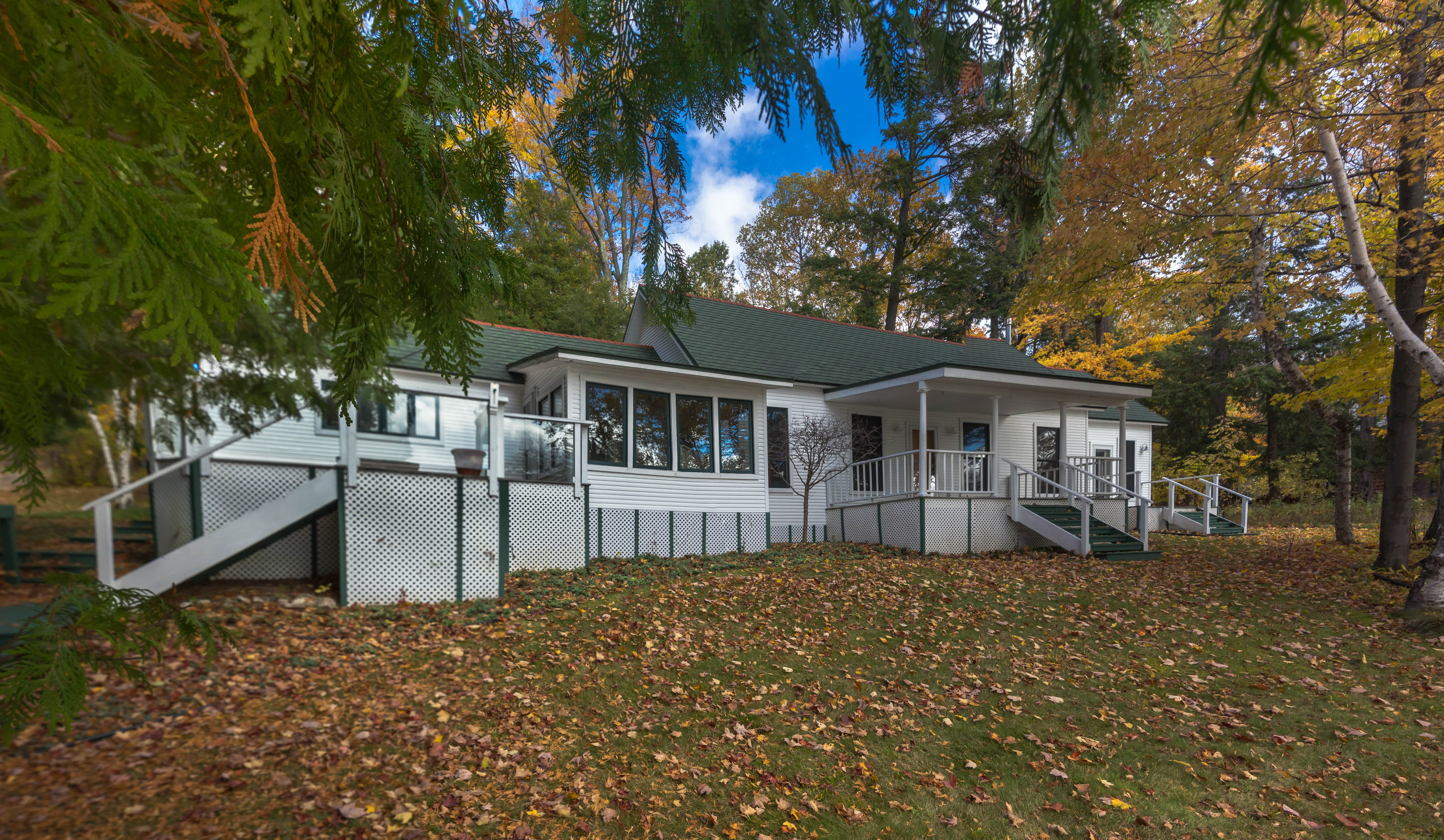
- Windemere 2018

- Location within Michigan Location within the United States
- Interactive map
- Location: 6502 Lake Grove Rd., Petoskey, Michigan
- Coordinates: 45°16′50.21″N 85°0′4.046″W
- Built: 1900
- Architect: Grace Hall Hemingway
- NRHP reference No.: 68000026

Significant dates
- Added to NRHP: November 24, 1968
- Designated NHL: November 24, 1968

The Ernest Hemingway Cottage, also known as Windemere, was the boyhood summer home of author Ernest Hemingway, on Walloon Lake in Michigan, United States. It was declared a National Historic Landmark in 1968.

== History ==
In about 1898, Dr. Clarence Hemingway and his wife Grace Hall Hemingway purchased four lots at this site on the shore of Walloon Lake. In 1899, they identified a location to construct a cottage, which Grace designed. In 1900, the couple spent $400 to have this cottage constructed on the site, which they dubbed "Windemere." The family spent summers at the cottage; Ernest Hemingway, born in 1899, spent every summer here from 1900 - 1920, save 1918. In 1904, they added a kitchen, connected to the main house with a breezeway. Later, a smaller "annex" was constructed to provide more bedrooms.

In 1921, Hemingway and Hadley Richardson honeymooned in the cottage. Hemingway returned to the cottage only once more in his life, in the early 1950s.

After his mother died, Hemingway was willed the cottage. Although he did not visit, he retained ownership until his own death in 1961. At his request, Hemingway's widow transferred ownership of the cottage to his younger sister Madelaine, who used it until her own death. It later passed to Hemingway's nephew, Ernie Mainland, but he died in 2021 and was survived by his wife Judy and their son Ken.

== Description ==
The Ernest Hemingway Cottage is a single-story frame structure with a gabled roof and white clapboard siding measuring 20 feet by 40 feet. The main section of the cottage contains the sleeping and living rooms, along with a bathroom and utility closet. A smaller section contains the kitchen; a breezeway, originally screened but now enclosed, connects the two sides. The interior is covered with unpainted clapboard. The kitchen has been modernized.

A smaller "annex" building, constructed a few years after the main cottage, stands a few yards away. A modern garage is located behind the cottage.

== In literature ==
Hemingway used the northern Michigan setting in a number of his works, most featuring his character Nick Adams. The cottage appears in "The Doctor and the Doctor's Wife," "Ten Indians," "The Indians Moved Away," "The Last Good Country," and "Wedding Day."

== Images ==
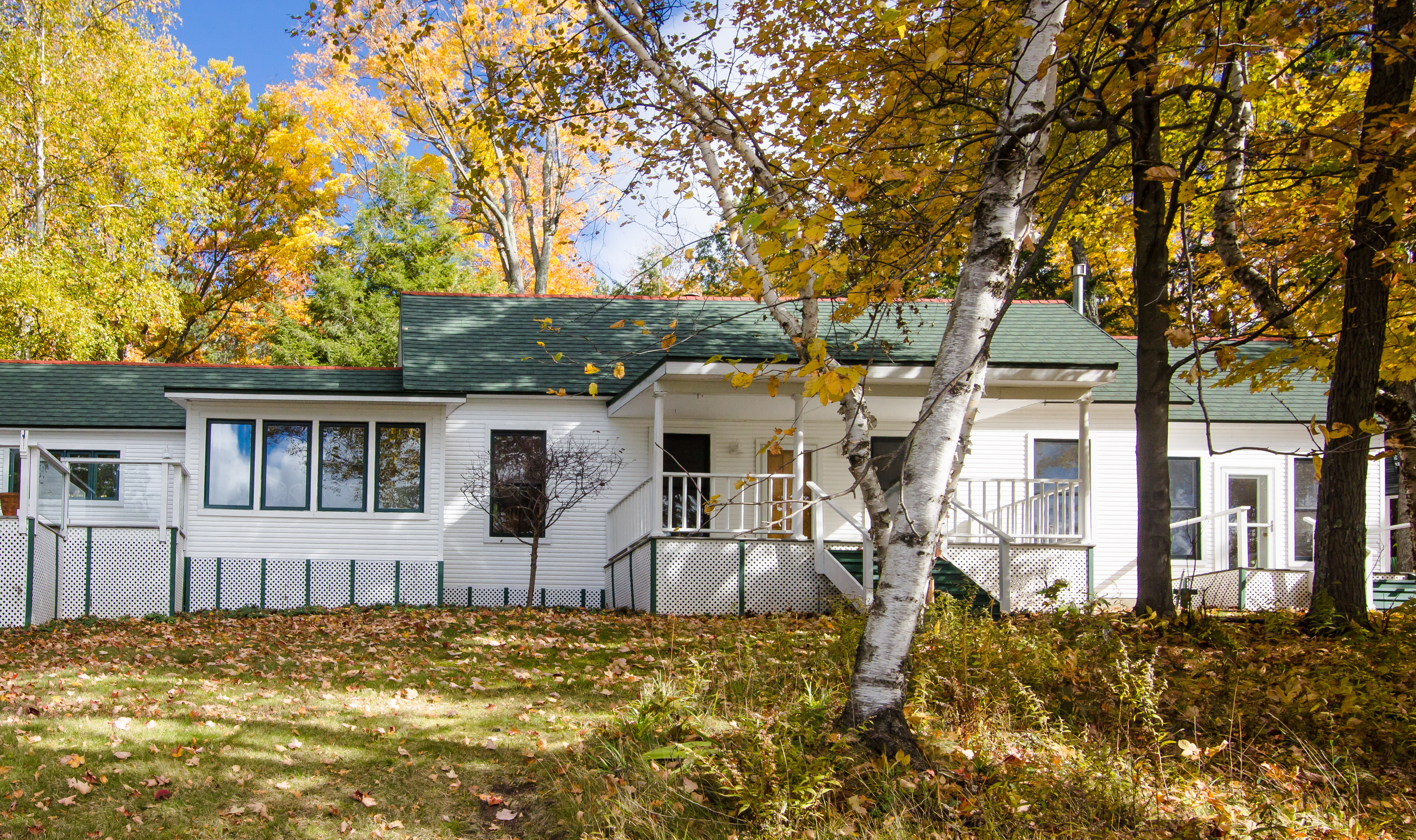

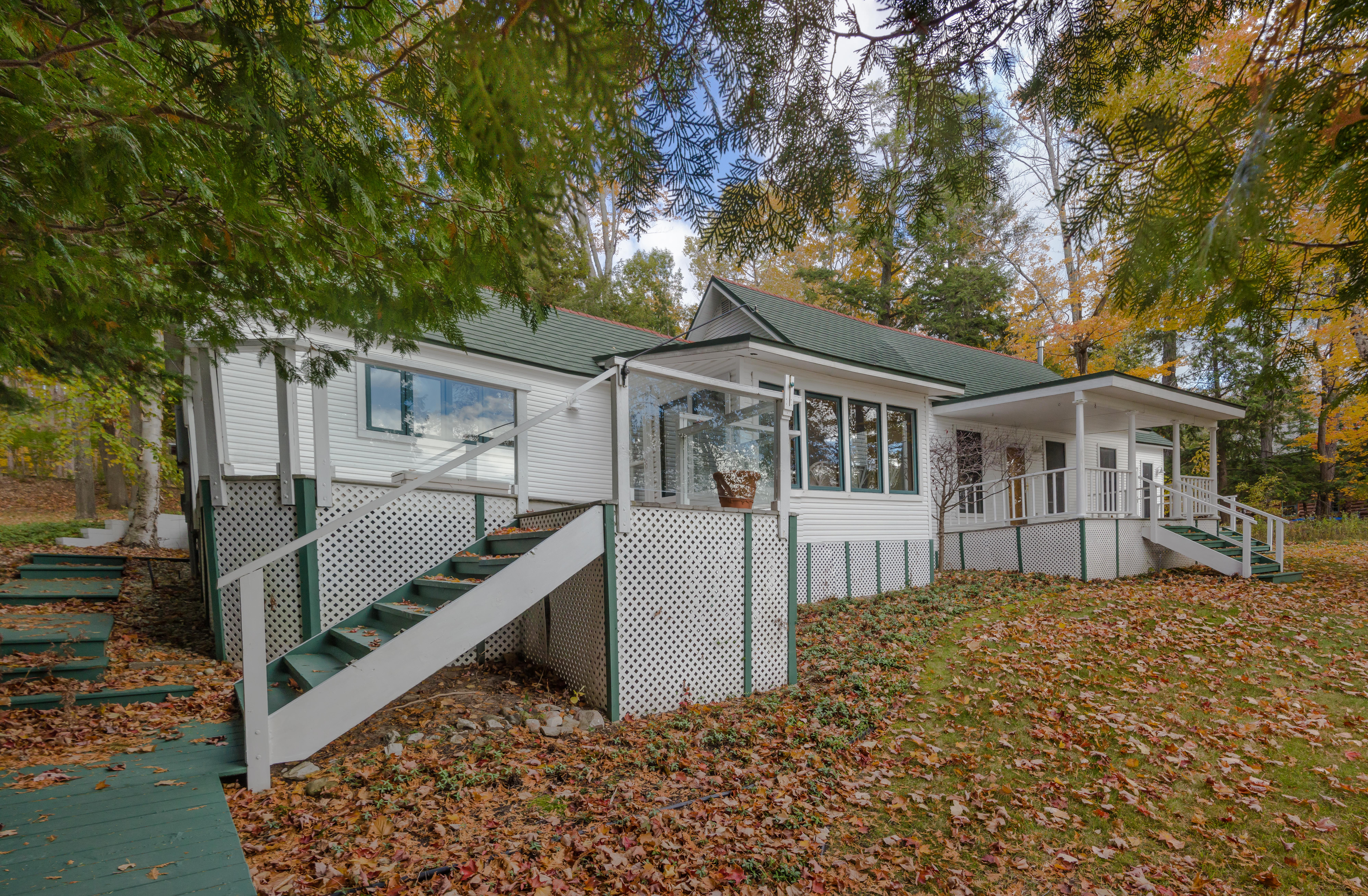

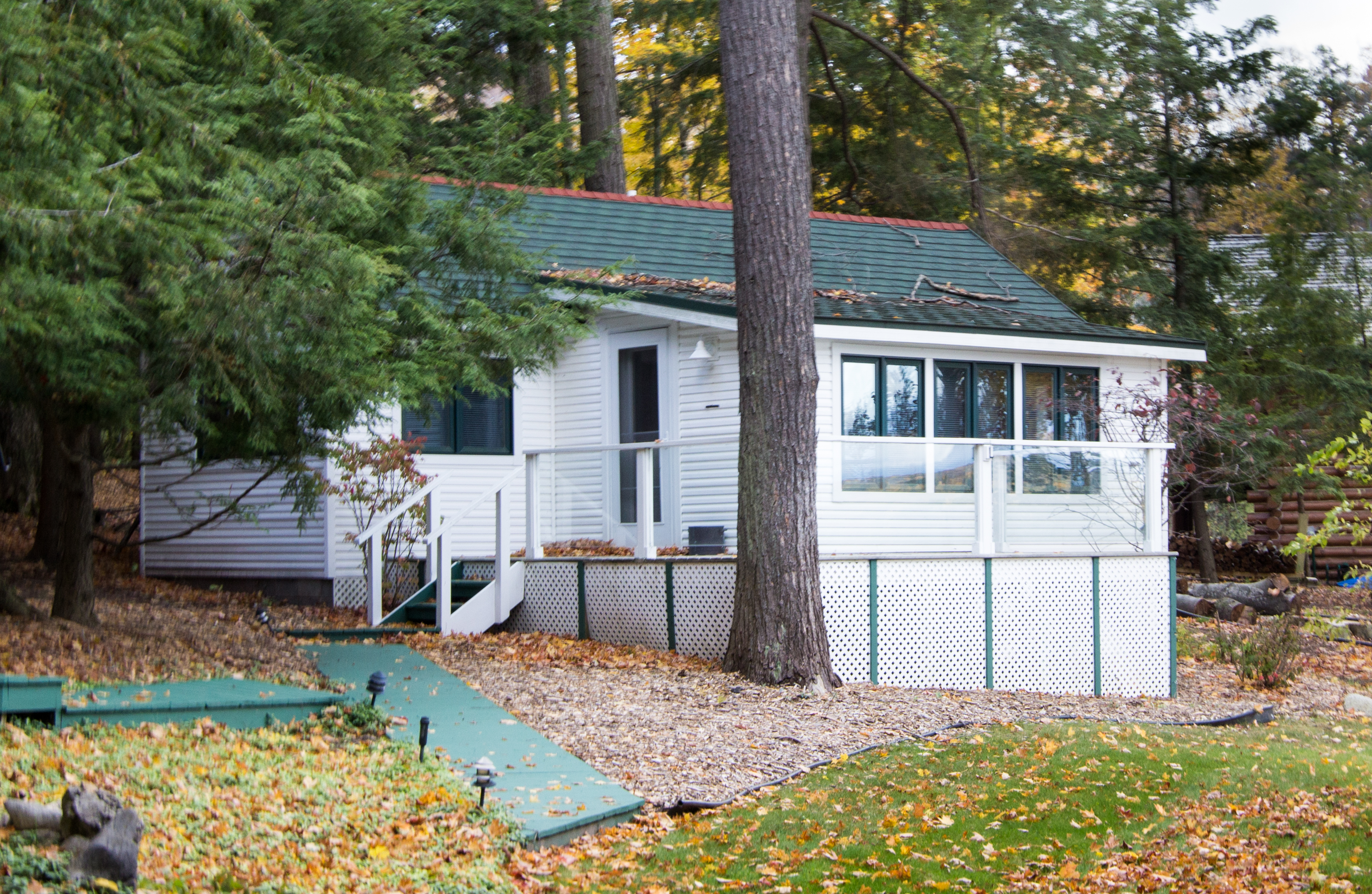

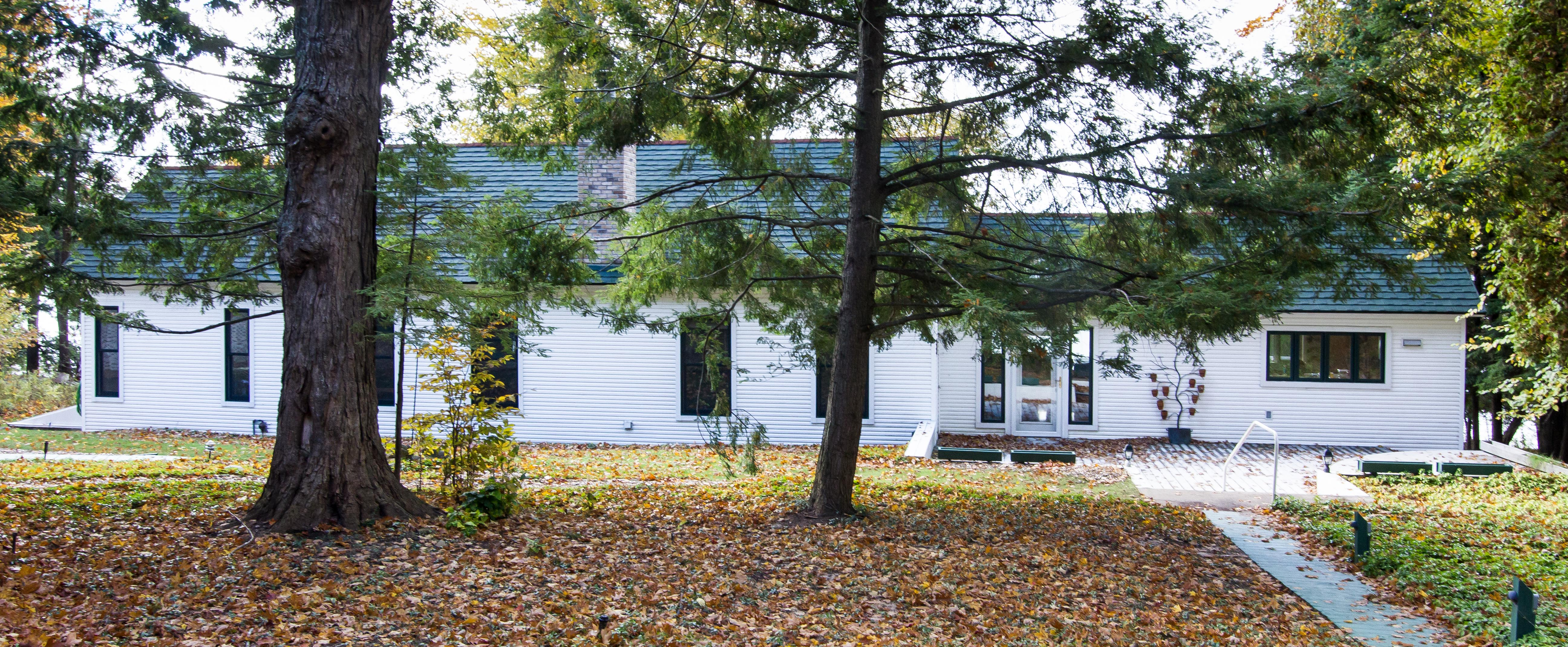

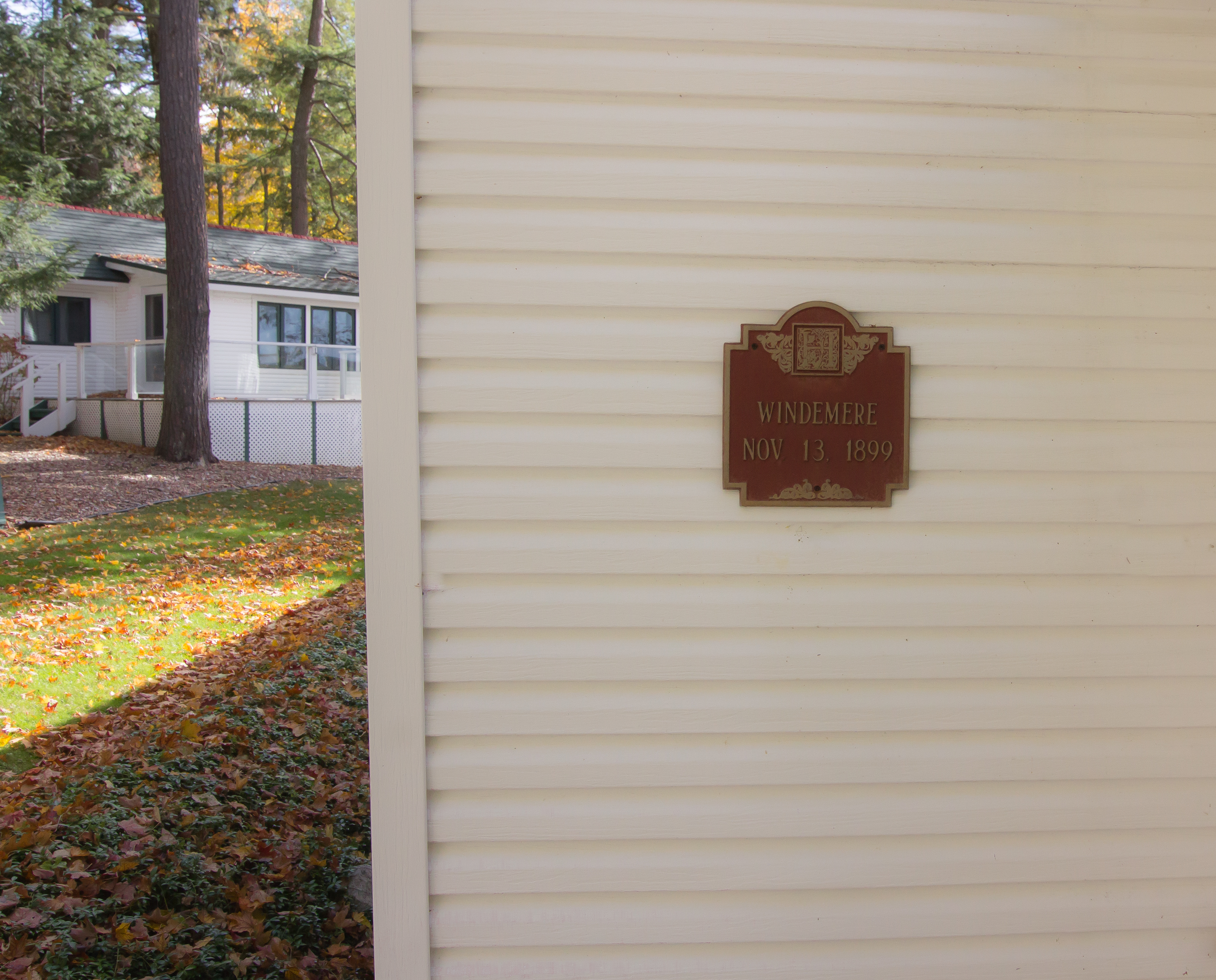

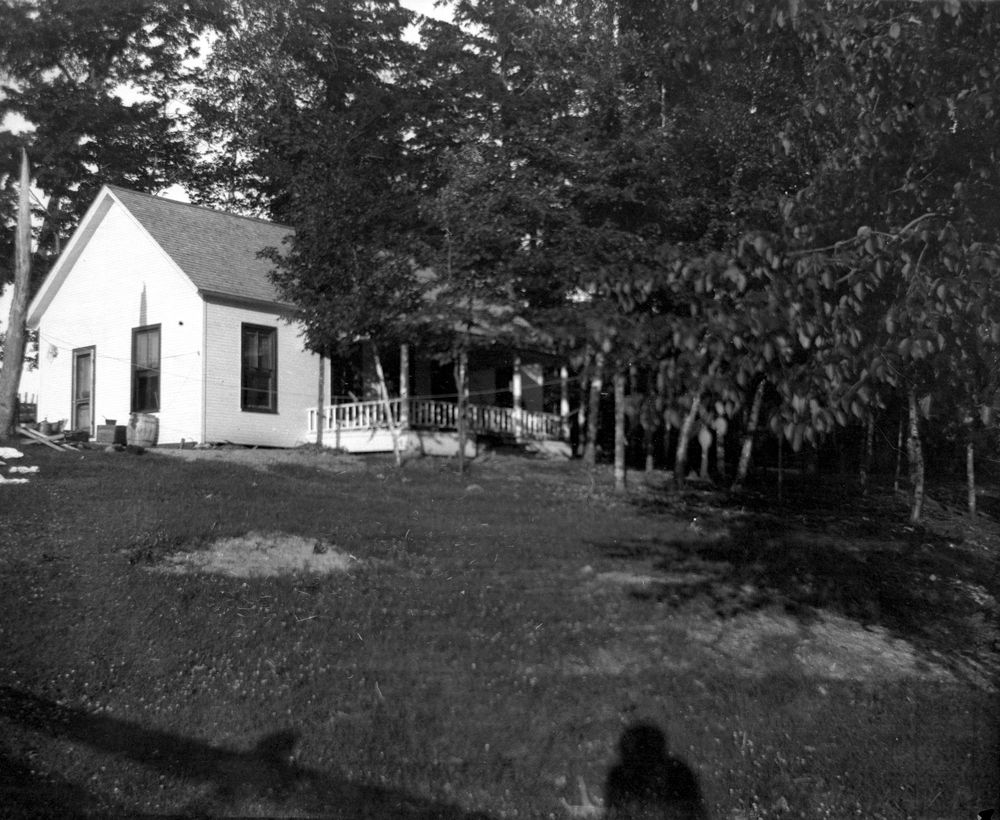
Windemere cottage (c. 1920)

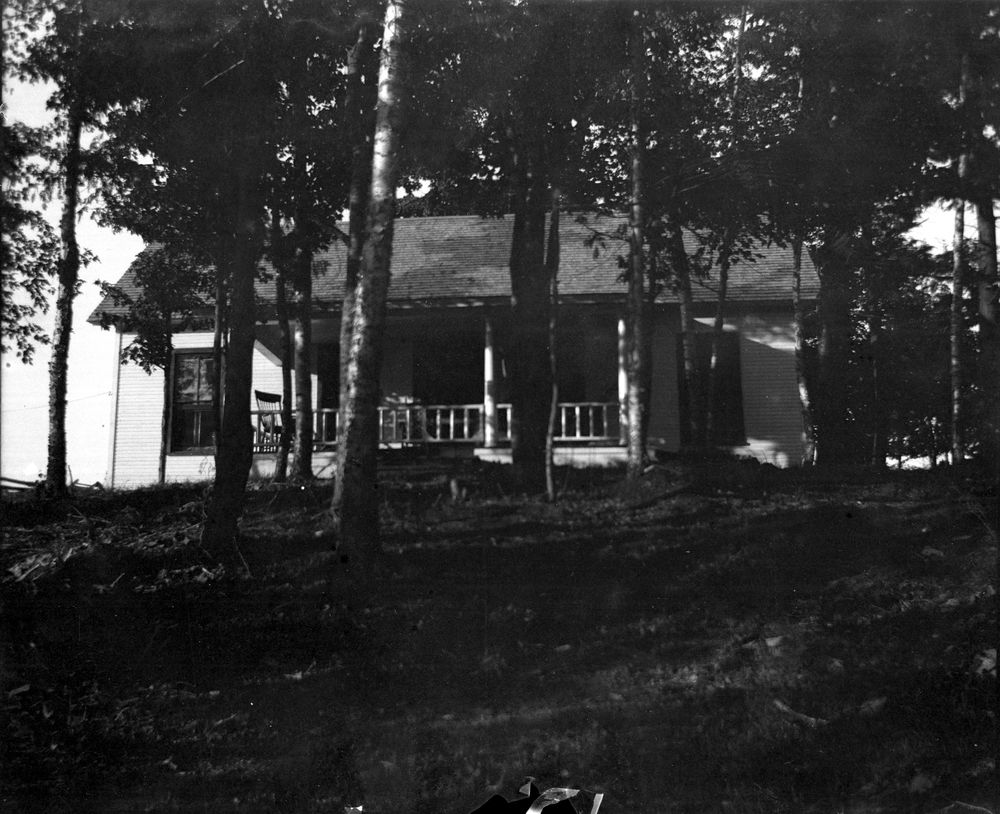
Windemere cottage (c. 1920)

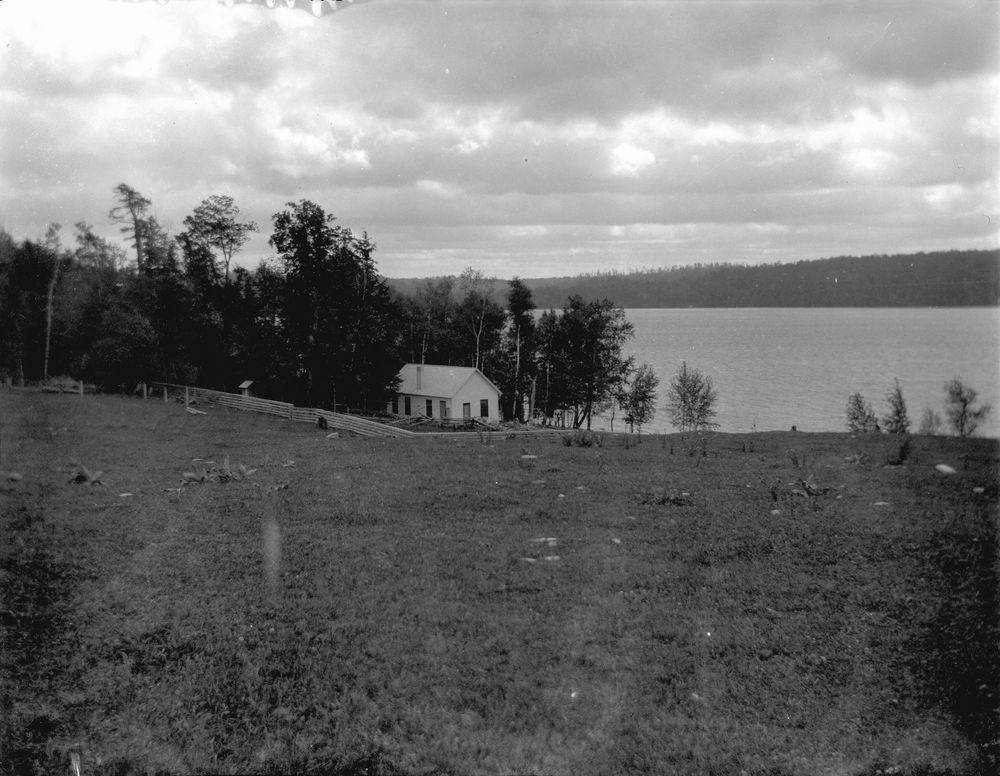
Windmere cottage and Walloon Lake, Michigan. (c. 1920)

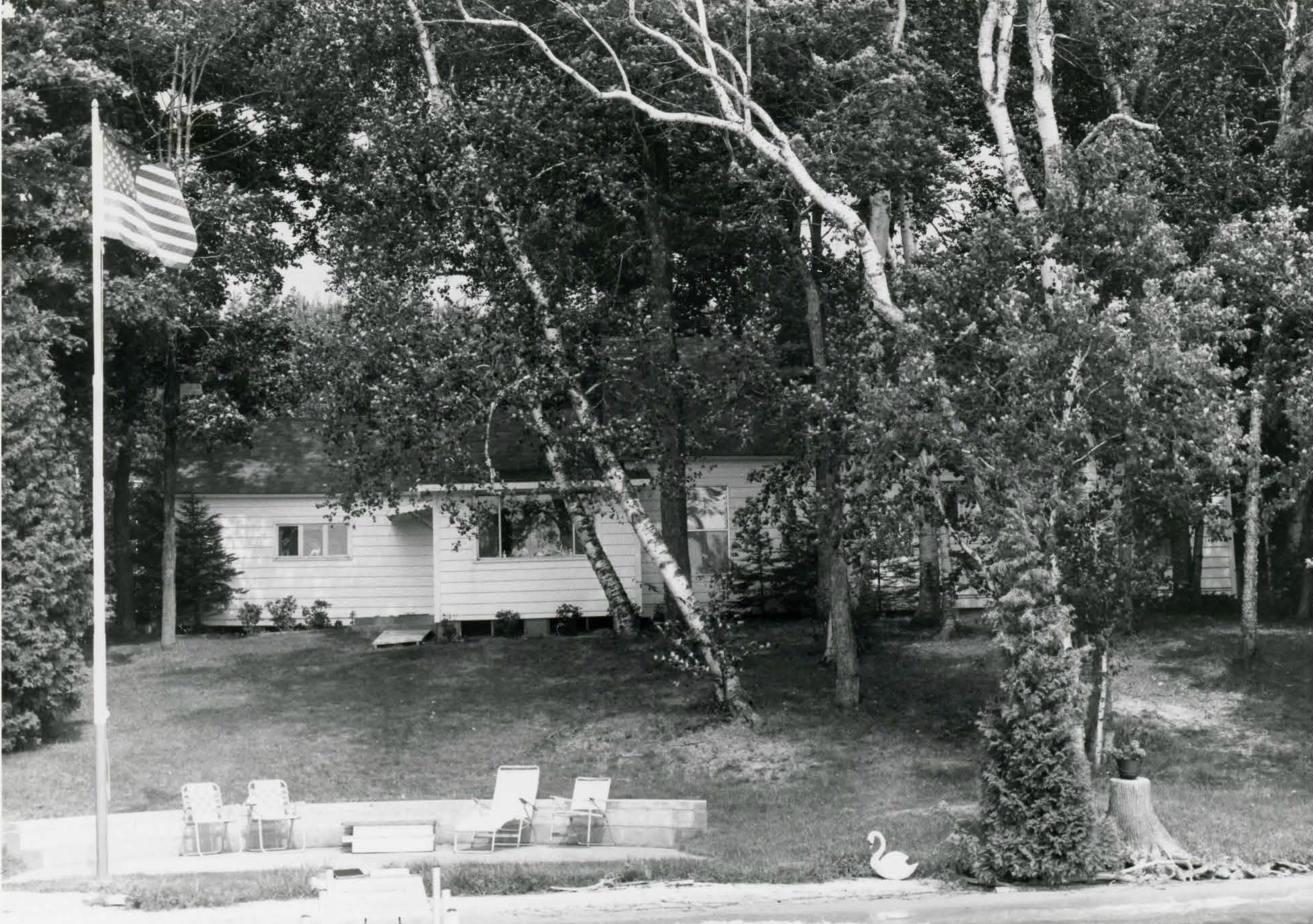
Cottage, looking north (1974)

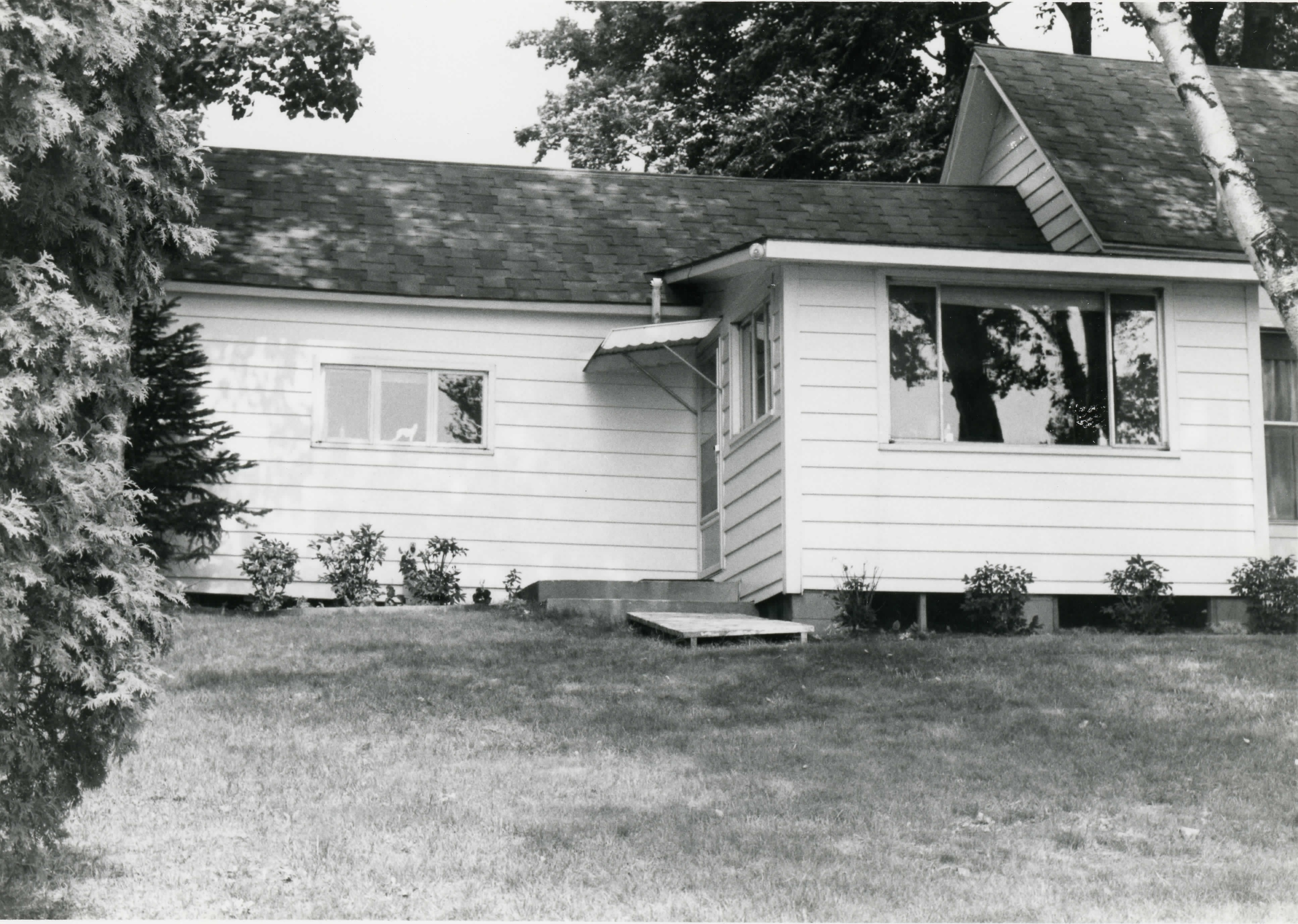
West end of the cottage, looking north (1974)

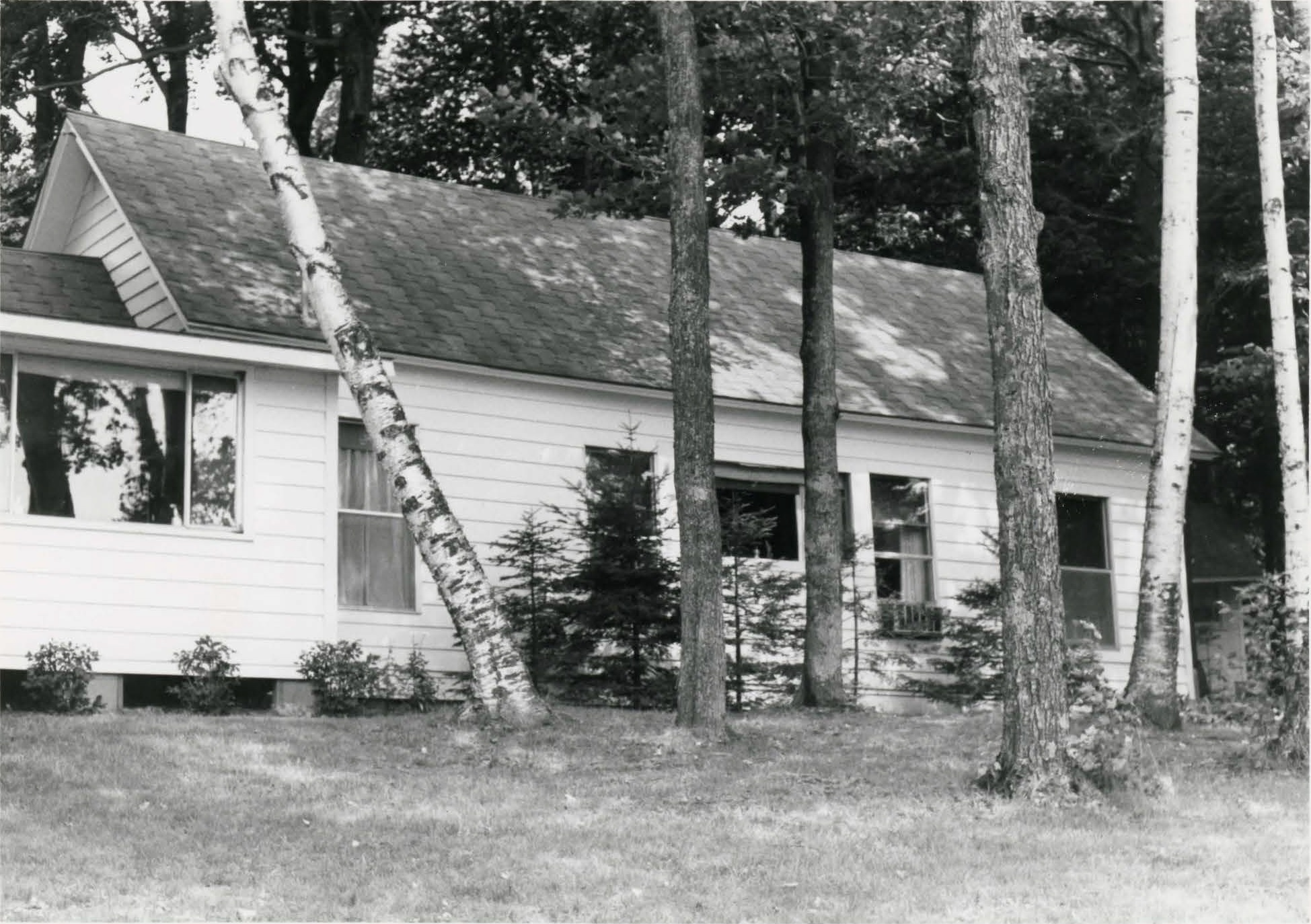
East end of the cottage (1974)

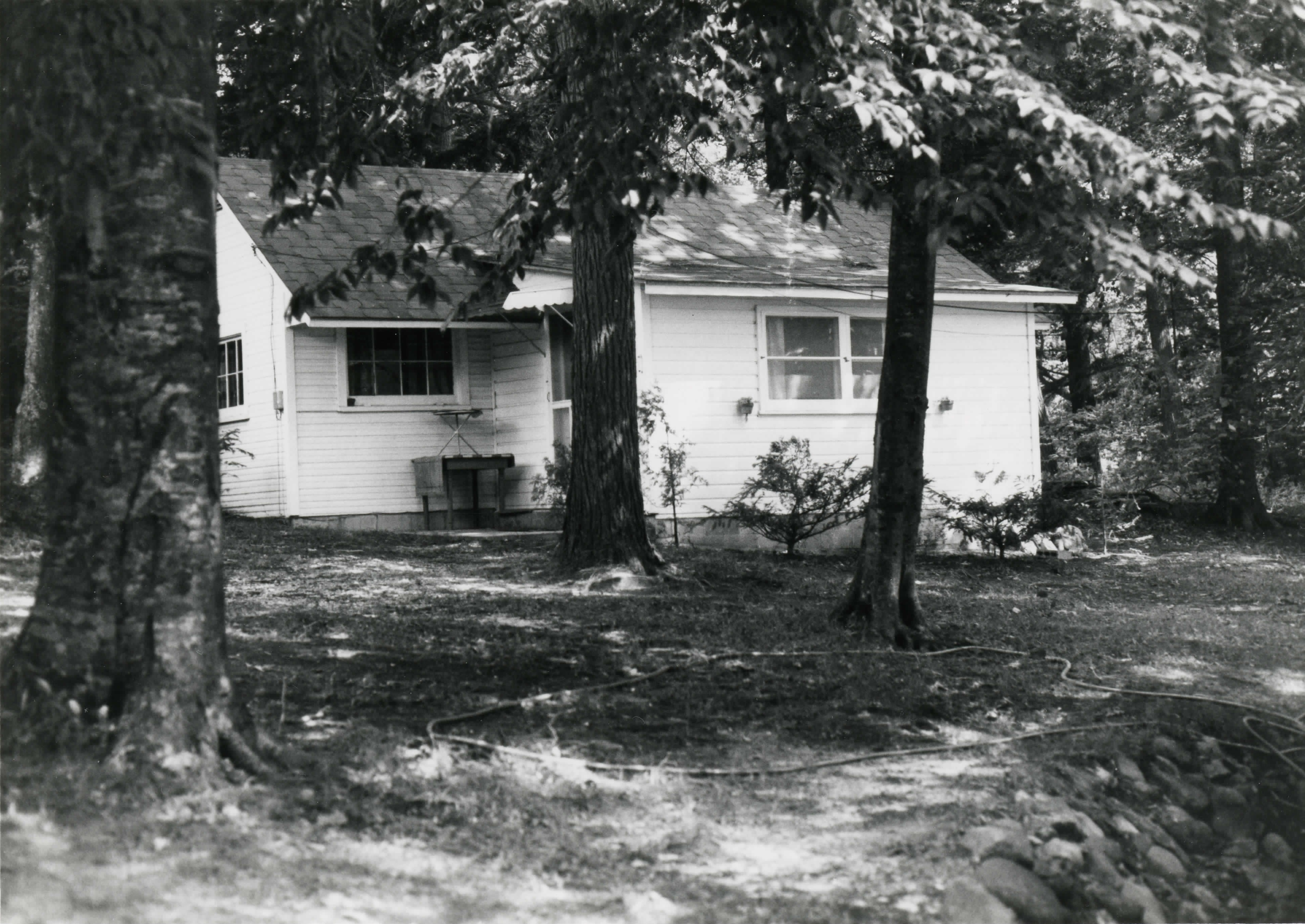
View of the annex, looking west (1974)

== See also ==
- Birthplace of Ernest Hemingway
- Ernest and Mary Hemingway House, Ketchum, Idaho
- Ernest Hemingway House, Key West, Florida
- List of National Historic Landmarks in Michigan
- National Register of Historic Places listings in Emmet County, Michigan
- List of residences of American writers
