= Hemingway House (Little Rock, Arkansas) =

Historic house in Arkansas, United States

- U.S. National Register of Historic Places
- U.S. Historic district – Contributing property
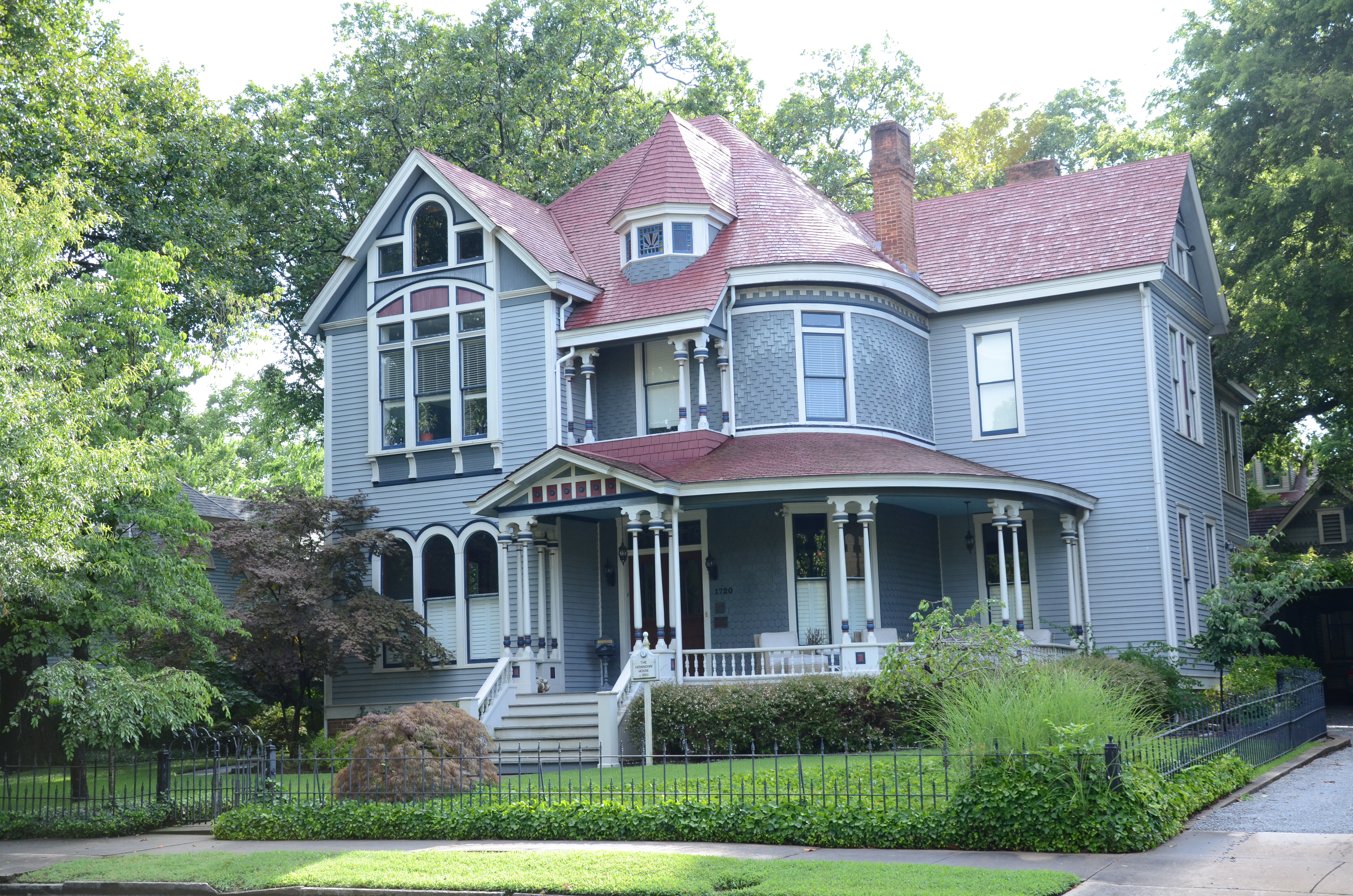

- Location within Arkansas Location within the United States
- Location: 1720 Arch St., Little Rock, Arkansas
- Coordinates: 34°43′57″N 92°16′46″W
- Area: less than one acre
- Built: 1894
- Architect: Charles L. Thompson
- Architectural style: Queen Anne
- Part of: Governor's Mansion Historic District (1988 enlargement) (ID88000631)
- MPS: Thompson, Charles L., Design Collection TR
- NRHP reference No.: 82000900

Significant dates
- Added to NRHP: December 22, 1982
- Designated CP: May 19, 1988

The Hemingway House is a historic house at 1720 Arch Street in Little Rock, Arkansas. It is a 2 1/2-story wood-frame structure, with complex massing and exterior typical of the Queen Anne period. A projecting bay on the left has a distinctive array of arched windows on the first floor, and a projecting trio of sash windows set in a bracket-supported surround, with a Palladian window in the gable above. The house colors were selected with the assistance of "Dr. Color," Bob Buckter, noted San Francisco color consultant, earning it a place in the 1994 book, America's Painted Ladies: The Ultimate Celebration of Our Victorians. The porch has delicate turned posts, in a distinctive tapered shape with flared bases and knobs at the top. The house was designed by the noted Arkansas architect Charles L. Thompson and construction was completed in 1894. The Hemingway House is one of the oldest examples of Thompson's work that is still standing.

The property on which the house sits was purchased in 1890 by Wilson E. Hemingway, then serving as a Justice of the Arkansas Supreme Court, and his wife Helen. Judge Hemingway resigned from the Court in 1893 and entered private practice with U. M. Rose and, his son, George B. Rose, forming what was then called Rose, Hemingway and Rose. Today, it is the Rose Law Firm. Judge Hemingway remained a partner in the firm until his death in 1922.

The Hemingway House was sold in the 1920s, falling into disrepair as a boarding house. Its deterioration was halted in 1982, when it was purchased by Mr. Charles Hogan, who meticulously restored the carriage house and the exterior of the main residence, with the help of Witsell, Evans & Rasco, Architects. Work continued on the interior of the house when it was purchased by Scott and Sharon Mosley in 1986. The couple completed the interior restoration and landscaping, living in the residence until 2010. The house was listed on the National Register of Historic Places in 1982.

== See also ==
- National Register of Historic Places listings in Little Rock, Arkansas
