= The Community Library =

Coordinates: 43°41′02″N 114°21′42″W

The Community Library is a public library in Ketchum, Idaho. The library is privately funded and open to the public. The Gold Mine Thrift Store has been a source of funding for the library since its inception. The library also operates the Wood River Museum of History and Culture, the Gold Mine Consign, and the Ernest and Mary Hemingway House and Preserve.

In 2024 The Community Library received the "Library of the Year" award from the Idaho Library Association for its advocacy work for libraries during the previous State Legislative session.

== History ==
The Community Library Association was founded in 1955 by 17 women as a non-profit organization to create a privately-funded and governed library. Founders include Clara Spiegel, Anita Gray and Jeanne Rodger Lane. The women first opened the Gold Mine Thrift Store in a log cabin to earn funds to build a library to serve Ketchum, Sun Valley, and Triumph.

The first library (now the actual Gold Mine Thrift Store) was built in 1957. In 1977 the library built a new structure designed by architect Dates Fryberger to house their increasing collection, and enlarged this design again in 1986 and 1997. An award-winning remodel by Humphries Poli Architects and Nichole Snyder Interiors was completed in 2019.

== Collections and services ==
As of 2024, The Community Library contained 106,000 physical items from printed books to charging cables, and 46,000 digital items. Special collections include regional history archives with oral histories and early Sun Valley photographs from the Union Pacific Railroad, clothing from Mary Hemingway, Ernest Hemingway's personal book collection from the Hemingway House, the Clara Spiegel Collection, and Arion Press books.

The library hosts high speed fiber Wi-Fi, accessible from inside and outside of the building. There are 12 computers for patron use with Microsoft or Apple software, along with free printing. Technical help is available for individuals with their own devices. Meeting rooms are open to the public for private booking; the sizes range from 4-25 people. The Reference Librarian handles test proctoring and research requests. The Children's department has a room with gaming computers for kids, and a teen-only lounge.

Library programs include conversations with varied authors, local interest groups, a yearly Hemingway Distinguished Lecture, and a writer-in-residence at the Hemingway House.
