= Hemingway House and Barn (Fayetteville, Arkansas) =

Historic house in Arkansas, United States

Coordinates: 36°06′39″N 94°07′54″W

- U.S. National Register of Historic Places
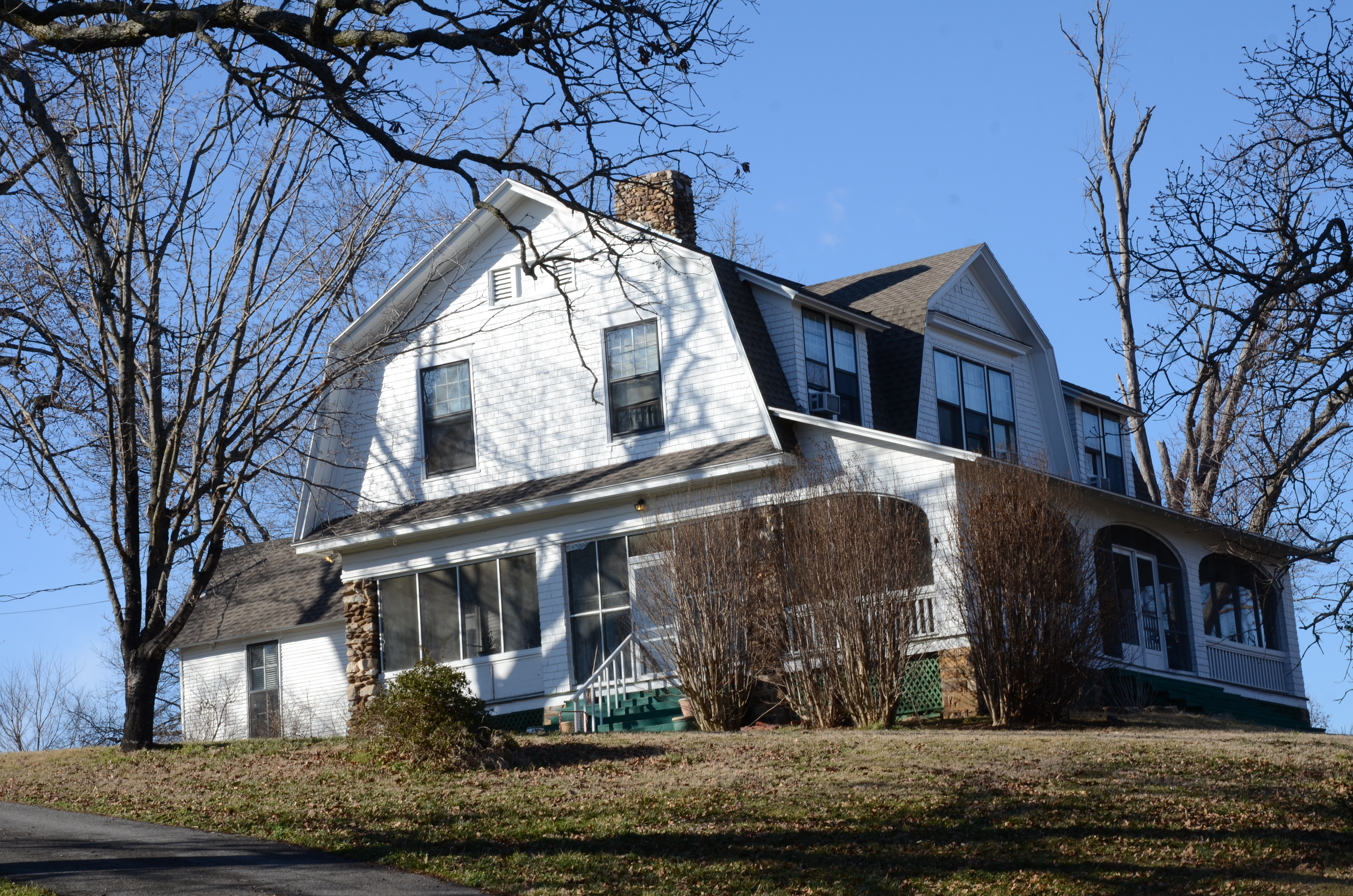

- Location within Arkansas Location within the United States
- Location: 3310 Old Missouri Rd., Fayetteville, Arkansas
- Area: 13.6 acres (5.5 ha)
- Built: 1907
- Architect: Charles L. Thompson
- Architectural style: Dutch Colonial
- NRHP reference No.: 82002148
- Added to NRHP: August 12, 1982

The Hemingway House and Barn is a historic summer estate at 3310 Old Missouri Road in Fayetteville, Arkansas. The house is a two-story wood-frame gambrel-roofed structure, set in a landscape designed (as were the buildings) by Little Rock architect Charles L. Thompson. The house and barn were built for Elwin Hemingway, a local lawyer. The barn, located just southwest of the house, is believed to be the only architect-designed structure of its type in the state.

The property was listed on the National Register of Historic Places in 1982.

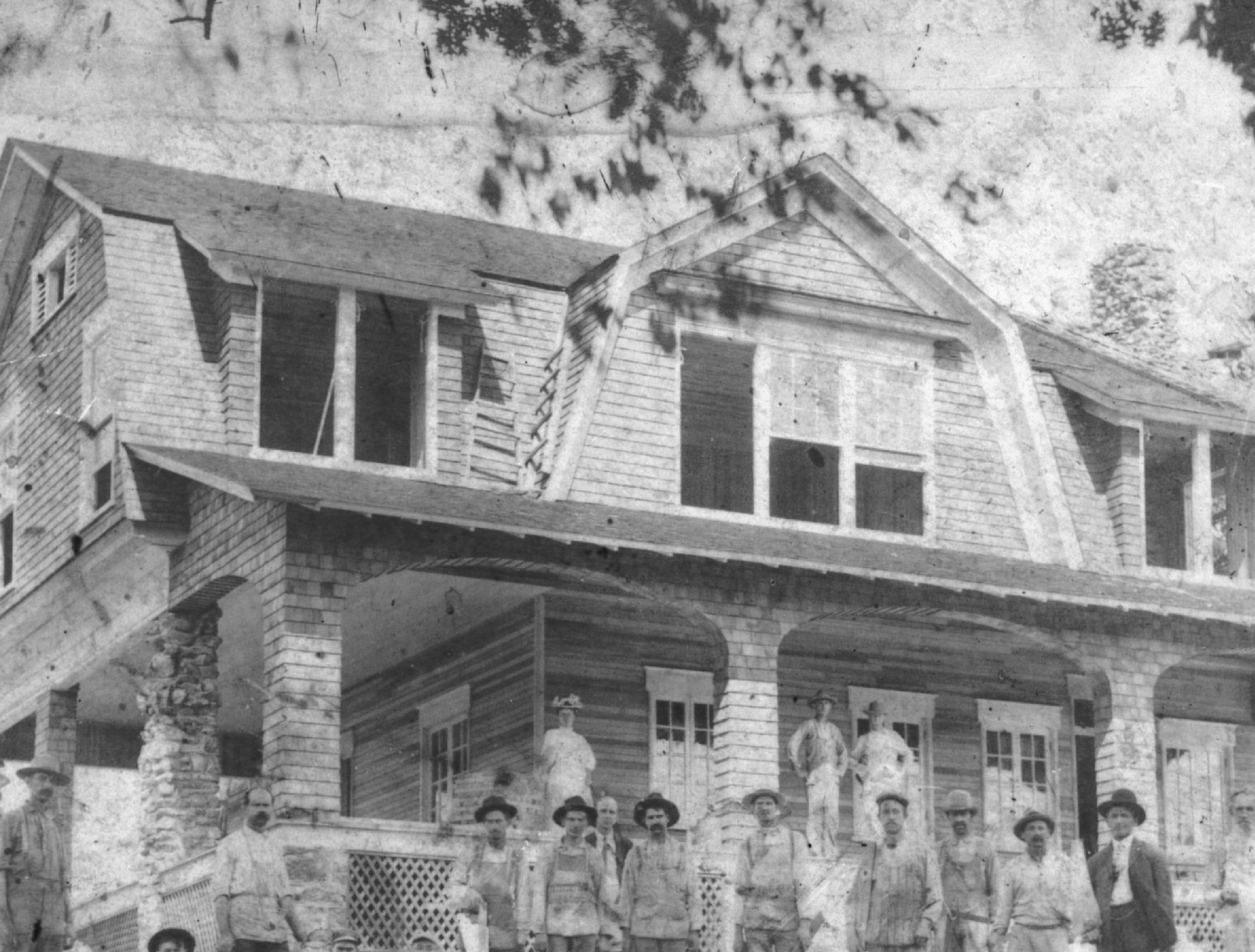
Elwin Hemingway pictured with craftsmen during Hemingway House construction.

== See also ==
- National Register of Historic Places listings in Washington County, Arkansas
