= Michael McGuire (author) =

Author and newspaper columnist

- Citizenship: Australia
- Occupations: Author, columnist, journalist
- Writing career
- Language: English
- Genres: Journalism, non-fiction, fiction

Michael McGuire is an author and newspaper columnist for The Advertiser in South Australia. In 2016, he won the South Australian Media Award for "Best Coverage of Sport All Media".

His novel Never a True Word is a political and legal thriller, and was published by Wakefield Press in 2017.
