= Hilary Hemingway =

American author (born 1961)

- Born: 1961 (age 64–65)
- Occupation: Author
- Spouses: Jeff Lindsay
- Children: 3
- Father: Leicester Hemingway

Hilary Hemingway (born 1961) is an American author. She grew up in Miami Beach, and, as of 2016, lives on Cape Coral.

Many of her earlier published works were co-authored with her husband, Jeff Lindsay. They have three children. She produced a 2002 documentary for PBS titled Hemingway in Cuba.

She is the daughter of Leicester Hemingway and niece of Ernest Hemingway.

In 2009, Hemingway co-wrote a feature screenplay with actor/director Andy Garcia, Hemingway & Fuentes; it follows Ernest Hemingway's friendship with Cuban Captain Gregorio Fuentes during the last ten years Ernest spent on the island of Cuba. The film was being produced by CineSon Productions. As of 2016, the film has not yet been made.

== Bibliography ==
- Hemingway, Hilary; Jeffry P Lindsay (1995). Dreamchild. New York: Forge. pp. 319 p. ISBN 978-0-312-85631-1. OCLC: 31605451.
- Dorn, Michael; Hilary Hemingway; Jeffry P Lindsay (1997). Time blender. New York: HarperPrism. pp. 276 p. ISBN 978-0-06-105682-6. OCLC: 37498886.
- Hemingway, Hilary; Jeffry P Lindsay (2000). Hunting with Hemingway. New York: Riverhead Books. pp. 316 p. ISBN 978-1-57322-159-7. OCLC: 43790898.
- Hemingway, Hilary; Carlene Brennen (2003). Hemingway in Cuba. New York: Rugged Land. pp. 146 p. ISBN 978-1-59071-010-4. OCLC: 52180397.
