= Timeline of Pamplona =

The following is a timeline of the history of the city of Pamplona, Spain.

== Prior to 20th century ==
- 74 BC – Pompaelo founded by Romans.
- 68 BC – Pamplona rebuilt by Pompey the Great.
- 5th century AD – Diocese of Pamplona established.
- 466 AD – Visigoth Euric in power.
- 542 – City taken by Frankish forces of Childebert.
- 778 – City sacked by forces of Charlemagne.
- 799 – Mutarrif Ier ibn Musa in power.
- 806 – Franks in power.
- 824 – Basque Íñigo Arista becomes King of Pamplona.
- 907 – City besieged by Moorish forces.
- 1124 – Pamplona Cathedral consecrated.
- 1138 – City besieged by Castilian forces.
- 1231 – San Nicolás church rebuilt.
- 1297 – San Cernin church rebuilt.
- 1397 – Beginning of construction of Pamplona Cathedral a late Gothic structure.
- 1423 – Districts of Navarrería, Saint Sernin, and Saint Nicholas unified.
- 1490 – Printing press in use.
- 1512 – City becomes part of Castile.
- 1556 – Hospital de Nuestra Senora de la Misericordia built.
- 1569 – Citadel construction begins.
- 1716 – Juan de Camargo y Angulo becomes Catholic bishop of Pamplona.
- 1755 – City Hall rebuilt.
- 1830 – Taconera park laid out (approximate date).
- 1836-40 – In the First Carlist War it was held by the Christinos
- 1839 – Political demonstration.
- 1857 – Population: 22,702.
- 1875 – Attacked by the Carlists in the Third Carlist War, but not taken.
- 1881 – Hotel La Perla in business.
- 1888 – City expanded by six blocks ("I Ensanche").
- 1897 – El Pensamiento Navarro newspaper begins publication.
- 1900 – Population: 28,886.

== 20th century ==
- 1903 – Diario de Navarra newspaper begins publication.
- 1915 – City walls partially dismantled; city expanded ("II Ensanche").
- 1920
  - CA Osasuna football team formed.
  - Population: 32,635.
- 1922 – Plaza de Toros de Pamplona (bullring) built.
- 1923 – La Voz de Navarra newspaper begins publication.
- 1939 – CD Iruña football club formed.
- 1940 – CD Oberena football club formed.
- 1952 – University of Navarra founded.
- 1956 – Museum of Navarre, Pamplona (museum) opens.
- 1958 – CD Pamplona football club formed.
- 1960 – Population: 97,880.
- 1967 – El Sadar Stadium opens.
- 1970 – Population: 147,168.
- 1978 – José María Cirarda Lachiondo becomes Catholic bishop of Pamplona.
- 1979 – Julián Balduz becomes mayor.
- 1982 – Navarra Hoy newspaper begins publication.
- 1987 – Universidad Pública de Navarra established.
- 1988 – Euskalerria Irratia radio begins broadcasting.
- 1990 – Kojón Prieto y los Huajolotes (musical group) formed.
- 1991 – Population: 191,197.
- 1993
  - Diário de Notícias newspaper begins publication.
  - Fernando Sebastián Aguilar becomes Catholic bishop of Pamplona.
- 1995
  - Democrats' Convergence of Navarre regional political party headquartered in city.
  - Javier Chourraut becomes mayor.
- 1998 – Pamplona City Transport in operation.
- 1999 – Yolanda Barcina becomes mayor.
- 2000 – Festival de Cine de Pamplona begins.

== 21st century ==
- 2003 – BaluArte Auditorium built.
- 2005 – Punto de Vista International Documentary Film Festival begins.
- 2007 – Nbici bikeshare program launched.
- 2011 – Enrique Maya becomes mayor.

== See also ==
- Pamplona history
- History of Pamplona
- List of mayors of Pamplona
- List of municipalities in Navarre

== Bibliography ==
- Abraham Rees (1819), "Pamplona", The Cyclopaedia, London: Longman, Hurst, Rees, Orme & Brown
- Richard Ford (1890), "Pamplona", Handbook for Travellers in Spain (7th ed.), London: J. Murray, hdl:2027/uva.x001198108
- "Pamplona". Spain and Portugal (3rd ed.). Leipsic: Karl Baedeker. 1908. OCLC 1581249.
- "Pamplona" . Encyclopædia Britannica. Vol. 20 (11th ed.). 1910. p. 662.
- Ramón Ruiz Amado [in Spanish] (1911). "Pamplona". Catholic Encyclopedia. New York.
- Ernest Hemingway (1926). The Sun Also Rises. (fiction set in Pamplona)
- "Pamplona". Satchel Guide to Spain and Portugal. Boston: Houghton Mifflin. 1930. hdl:2027/mdp.39015024367917.
- Jesús Etayo Zalduendo [in Spanish] (2004). Navarra, una soberanía secuestrada: historia y periodismo (1923-1931) (in Spanish). Txalaparta. ISBN 978-84-8136-359-3.
- Colum Hourihane, ed. (2012). "Pamplona". Grove Encyclopedia of Medieval Art and Architecture. Oxford University Press. ISBN 978-0-19-539536-5.
- E. Michael Gerli, ed. (2013). "Pamplona". Medieval Iberia: An Encyclopedia. Taylor & Francis. ISBN 978-1-136-77161-3.
