= Robert M. Coates =

Art critic, novelist, short story writer (1897–1973)

- Born: Robert Myron Coates; April 6, 1897; New Haven, Connecticut, U.S.
- Died: February 8, 1973 (aged 75); New York City, U.S.
- Education: Yale University
- Occupations: Writer, art critic
- Writing career
- Movement: Lost Generation

Robert Myron Coates (April 6, 1897 – February 8, 1973) was an American novelist, short story writer and art critic. He published five novels; one classic historical work, The Outlaw Years (1930) which deals with the history of the land pirates of the Natchez Trace; a book of memoirs, The View from Here (1960), and two travel books, Beyond the Alps (1962) and South of Rome (1965). During his unusually varied career, Coates explored many different genres and styles of writing and produced three experimental novels, The Eater of Darkness (1926), Yesterday’s Burdens (1933) and The Bitter Season (1946). Highly original, these novels draw upon expressionism, Dadaism and surrealism. His last two novels—Wisteria Cottage (1948) and The Farther Shore (1955)—are examples of crime fiction. Simultaneously to working as a novelist, Coates maintained a life-long career at the New Yorker, whose staff he joined in 1927. The magazine printed more than a hundred of his short stories many of which were collected in three anthologies; All the Year Round (1943), The Hour after Westerly (1957) and The Man Just ahead of You (1964). Also, from 1937 to 1967, Coates was the New Yorker’s art critic and coined the term “abstract expressionism” in 1946 in reference to the works of Hans Hofmann, Arshile Gorky, Jackson Pollock and Willem de Kooning and others. He was elected to the National Institute of Arts and Letters in 1958. Coates was married to sculptor Elsa Kirpal from 1927 to 1946. Their first and only child, Anthony Robertson Coates, was born on March 4, 1934. In 1946, they divorced and Coates married short story writer Astrid Meighan-Peters. He died of cancer of the throat in New York City on February 8, 1973.

Anthony Boucher praised Coates as "one of the most persuasive recorders of the unaccountable and disturbing moment," singling out his fantasy stories for their "haunting tone of uncertainty and dislocation." Floyd C. Gale said that The Eater of Darkness "has been called the first surrealist novel in English".

Maxim Lieber was Coates' literary agent from 1935 to 1938 and in 1941 and 1945.

== Life ==
=== Early life ===
Coates was born in New Haven, Connecticut in 1897. He was the second but only living child of Harriet Coates, a Victorian with feminist sympathies and Frederick Coates, a toolmaker-cum-inventor who became a professional designer of special machinery. In 1905, the Coates family embarked on a 10-year tour of the United States. They moved so often that Malcolm Cowley wrote that the young Coates “grew up in more places than laid claim to Homer.” Before he had turned eighteen, Coates had lived in various gold-mining camps in Colorado; in Seattle, Washington; Portland, Oregon; Cincinnati, Ohio; Springfield, Massachusetts; Buffalo, New York; New York City; and Rochester, New York. As a result, as Coates recalls in his book of memoirs, “everywhere we went, I was, for a period at least, the new boy, the outsider.” Even during the three years that the family stayed in Cripple Creek (1905–1908), they were far from stationary. They moved from the fairly large town of Victor to Independence, then moved on to Goldfield, and finally settled down in the tiny settlement of Christmas Crossing, a “mere clump of log huts and tar-papered shanties” at an altitude of close to eleven thousand feet.

=== Yale University and Woodstock ===
In 1915, Coates enrolled at Yale University (class of 1919). He published several short stories in the Yale Literary Magazine, and joined its editorial board in the spring of 1918. His early stories took their inspiration from realist writers like O. Henry on the one hand and naturalist writers like Du Maupassant and Theodore Dreiser on the other. Coates also was a member of the literary fraternity “Chi Delta Theta” where he found himself in the company of poet Stephen Vincent Benét, playwrights Thornton Wilder and Philip Barry, and future founder and editor of Time, Henry Luce. When the US became involved in World War I, Coates became a private in the Yale R.O.T.C. in November 1917 and joined the air service (naval aviation) in June 1918. The war was over, however, before he had obtained his wings.

After graduation, Coates moved to New York and worked as an advertising man for the United States Rubber Company. In the spring of 1921 he exchanged New York City for the rural surroundings of Woodstock, in upstate New York, and devoted himself to writing poetry. The following unpublished poem, inspired by metaphysical poetry, is called “The Noose:”

I hold my whole life like a noose,

Following you everywhere.

I hold it light and very loose

To make the better snare.

Still like the frightened butterfly

You would elude the net;

And like a gentle hunter, I

Shall fling it round you yet.

And though you flee across the field

And flutter in the heather.

Know that when captive you shall yield

We'll both be bound together.

=== Expatriation ===
In the winter of 1921, Coates sailed to Europe and settled down on 9 Rue de la Grande-Chaumière in Montparnasse, on Paris’s Left Bank. There he found himself in the heart of the bohemian Latin Quarter, much frequented by other American expatriates. Between 1921 and 1923, he established contacts with literary figures such as Arthur Moss, Florence Gilliam, Matthew Josephson, Malcolm Cowley, Kathleen Cannell, Harold Loeb, Ford Madox Ford, Ernest Hemingway and Laurence Vail. He published experimental prose sketches, with strong influences from expressionism and Dadaism, in the expatriate little magazines Gargoyle, Broom and Secession. In 1926, Coates’s first novel, The Eater of Darkness, was published in Paris by Robert McAlmon’s publishing company Contact Editions. Although he was part of the “lost generation,” Coates never liked to be grouped in that particular category. As he wrote in a New Yorker article:

“As a young man I went to France—on what I always thought was my own initiative, until the social historians got to delving into the period and I learned that I’d actually been following, sheeplike, in the tracks of a mass manifestation called ‘the literary exodus’ of a group called ‘the lost generation.’ It is always unsettling to be told that one’s motives are not what one thinks they are.”

In Paris, Coates developed a special relationship with Gertrude Stein, the matriarch of modernism who owned the famous salon on 27 Rue de Fleurus. According to Stein’s biographer, Coates had been “a Rue-de-Fleurus favorite”. Stein and Coates each made several attempts to further the other’s literary career: Stein recommended Coates twice for a John Simon Guggenheim Award, in 1928 and in 1935, and reviewed his second novel, Yesterday’s Burdens, for Scribner’s Magazine. Convinced of Coates’s creative originality, she praised him in her notorious Autobiography of Alice B. Toklas as one of the very few writers who “have an individual sense of words.” It followed that “Gertrude Stein took a very deep interest in Coates’s work as soon as he showed it to her. She said he was the one young man who had an individual rhythm, his words made a sound to the eyes, most people’s words don’t.” In turn, Coates tried to persuade the Macaulay Publishing Company in New York to publish an abridged version of The Making of Americans in 1930 and reviewed her work favourably in the New Yorker.

Coates’s acquaintance with the European literary avant-garde had a lasting impact on his literary career. Throughout the 1930s and 1940s, next to writing for the New Yorker, he continued to be passionate about literary form and style and remained much interested in literary experimentation. He published a short story in the first issue of the avant-garde magazine transition, founded by Eugene Jolas and Maria MacDonald in April 1927 and published two more stories in transition in 1928. After finishing the experimental novel The Eater of Darkness, he worked on a second avant-garde novel, Yesterday’s Burdens, which would appear with the Macaulay Company in 1933. A third experimental novel, The Bitter Season, appeared in 1946, which was followed by Wisteria Cottage, a superbly written crime novel which contained several stylistic features not generally associated with the genre such as parentheses, repetition and stream-of-consciousness writing. Also, like much of his earlier work, Wisteria Cottage resonates with genres of popular culture such as the crime novel and the film noir, creating a bridge between high and low culture much practiced by the European avant-garde, from cubism to surrealism.

=== Coates and The New Yorker ===
Coates returned to New York in 1926 and found employment as a staff writer at the newly founded New Yorker in 1927. After interviews with James Thurber, who would become a close friend, and founding editor Harold Ross, he was hired on the spot. Coates’s appointment at the New Yorker was the start of a life-long association. Next to James Thurber, who became a particularly close friend, Coates developed friendships with several of the New Yorker’s editors and associates, among them E.B. and Katharine White, Wolcott Gibbs, Dorothy Parker, Janet Flanner, St. Clair McKelway, Gus Lobrano, Russell Maloney, Ann Honeycut, S. J. Perelman, and later, William Keepers Maxwell, Jr. and Brendan Gill. Coates resigned from his position as staff writer in 1932, soon after his move to Gaylordsville, Connecticut, in 1931, but continued to write for the New Yorker until 1967.

During his many years of involvement with the magazine he contributed to many different departments—among them “The Talk of the Town,” “Notes and Comment,” “Profiles” and “The Reporter-at-Large.” Coates was the magazine’s book critic from 1930 to 1933 and became their art critic in 1937, a position that he held until 1967. From 1932 onwards he also developed a career as a New Yorker short story writer, submitting over a hundred short stories between 1921 and 1967. In all, as New Yorker scholar Ben Yagoda has pointed out, Coates wrote “more words for the magazine than anyone else, with the possible exception of [E.B.] White and [Wolcott] Gibbs.”

One of the literary relationships that came out of Coates’s stint as the New Yorker’s book reviewer was his close friendship with Nathanael West, whom he met after his enthusiastic review of Miss Lonelyhearts. Another noticeable outcome was a public altercation, in the pages of the New Yorker, with fellow novelist Ernest Hemingway, after Coates’s review of Death in the Afternoon as a “strange book, childish, here and there, in its small-boy wickedness of language; bitter, and even morbid in its preoccupation with fatality.” From the early 1930s onwards, Coates became increasingly interested in developing a new, urban, type of short story. The New Yorker became one of Coates’s favourite organs of publication and his reputation as a short story writer grew considerably. By 1943, when his first collection of short stories All the Year Round came out, several of his stories had appeared in prize anthologies: “The Fury” in the O. Henry Memorial Prize Stories of 1937, “Passing Through” in the Best Short Stories of 1939, “Let’s Not Talk About it Now” in O. Henry Memorial Prize Stories of 1940 and “The Net” in Best Short Stories of 1941. In addition, three Coates stories had been reprinted in the first anthology of New Yorker fiction, Short Stories from the New Yorker, 1925-1940. The anthology (which contained 68 stories, including Coates’s “The Fury,” “The Net” and “A Different World”) got rave reviews from the New York Herald Tribune, The New York Times and The Saturday Review and led to the recognition of The New Yorker as a major vehicle of high quality fiction, and an important influence besides. Coates's often starkly realistic and psychologically dark short stories of the 1930s and 1940s made a significant contribution to the magazine’s developing stature as an organ for quality fiction.

=== Coates as Novelist ===
Coates’s first novel, The Eater of Darkness, was published in Paris in 1926 and was republished in New York in 1929 by Macaulay, where it was promoted and hailed as a Dada novel by the critics. Macaulay also published Coates’s second novel, Yesterday’s Burdens, in 1933, which provided a portrait of life in New York City versus life in the Connecticut countryside. A third full-fledged experimental novel, The Bitter Season, appeared in 1946 with Harcourt, Brace and was written against the background of World War II and Coates’s own divorce from Elsa Kirpal.

All three novels share a passionate interest in conveying the mood and atmosphere of New York City as experienced by individual onlookers-participants at a certain moment in history through experiments in literary form. They reveal the writer as an idiosyncratic experimentalist who embraced literary innovation and placed great value on “art” but did not withdraw into solipsism. Like the work of William Carlos Williams, Coates’s fiction thrives on contact, both with the locality that inspired it, and with the reader. His first three novels are alike in that they seek to summon aesthetically a particular cultural or historical moment as witnessed and experienced by an individual who is both unique and representative, both a keen reporter and a harried participant.

After the writing of The Bitter Season, Coates changed literary course and turned away from literary experimentalism to embrace crime writing. Coates’s interest in violence—a preoccupation that he shared with such contemporaries writers as Thurber, Dos Passos, Wolfe, Hemingway, Faulkner, Fitzgerald, Steinbeck, Hammett and West—had been evident throughout his career. Before Wisteria Cottage, Coates had paid ample attention to beatings, rape, murder, car accidents, embezzlement, and suicide. Of these and other manifestations of violence, murder fascinated him the most. Murder crops up in all his earlier works—starting with the insane homicides of the infernal x-ray machine in The Eater of Darkness, on to the wild and gruesome murders of the American outlaws of the early nineteenth century, to speculation about the potential murder of Henderson in Yesterday’s Burdens, and to the impersonal violence of war and the personal threat posed by the Mexican in The Bitter Season. Coates had also featured murder in several of his short stories.

In Wisteria Cottage and The Farther Shore, however, the topic of murder was approached from a fresh angle. In all of Coates’s previous accounts of murder (except for the short story “The Net,” which is clearly a study for Wisteria Cottage), men had been the victims, not women. Also, again with the exception of “The Net,” Coates had not yet shown a murderer’s mind from within.

During the last years of his career Coates wrote a book of memoirs, The View from Here, and two travel books about his art trips to Italy, the acclaimed Beyond the Alps (1961) and South of Rome (1964). His final short story, entitled “The Setting-In of Winter,” was published in The New Yorker on December 9, 1967.

== Bibliography ==
=== Fiction ===
==== Novels ====
- The Eater of Darkness (Contact Editions, Paris 1926; Macaulay, New York 1929; republished by Putnam, 1959)
- Yesterday’s Burdens (1933; rpt. 1975, 2020)
- The Bitter Season (1946)
- Wisteria Cottage (1948; 1985, introduction by Brendan Gill). Appeared, in part, in Harper's Bazaar. Also known as The Night Before Dying. Filmed as Edge of Fury (1958).
- The Farther Shore (1955) Also known as The Night is So Dark.

==== Short stories ====
All stories first appeared in The New Yorker unless otherwise noted.

Title	First published	Reprinted/collected	Notes
"'ATC'"	September 9, 1927		
"The Subway Circuit"	February 3, 1928		
"Paper-match peril"	October 5, 1928		
"How much a word?"	November 9, 1928		
"Mammy!"	February 1, 1929		
"Leviathan: or whither today and tomorrow?"	July 18, 1930		
"The Dada City I"	August 15, 1930		
"The Dada City II"	August 22, 1930		
"The Dada City III"	August 29, 1930		
"Mr. Mowson wakes"	July 8, 1932		
"Encounter"	March 31, 1933		
"Wild Bird"	September 28, 1934	All the Year Round	
"Leavetaking"	October 12, 1934		
"The Royil Plan"	February 22, 1935		
"Sunday Visit"	May 3, 1935		
"The Voice"	August 16, 1935		
"The First Car Through"	February 14, 1936		
"IPA Laws"	March 20, 1936		
"Boy Friend"	March 27, 1936	All the Year Round	
"Ninety-second and Broadway"	May 22, 1936		
"Gil, This Is Lola"	June 5, 1936	All the Year Round	
"The Fury"	August 7, 1936	•All the Year Round •O. Henry Memorial Prize Stories of 1937	
"The Burgess Kids"	August 28, 1936	All the Year Round	
"A Walk On Sunday"	November 27, 1936	All the Year Round	
"To Mail A Letter"	April 23, 1937		
"Damned hotel"	April 30, 1937	All the Year Round	
"The Doorway"	May 28, 1937		
"Time In Its Flight"	June 4, 1937		
"Congress In Session"	June 18, 1937		
"A Truce To Inventions"	July 9, 1937		
"The Course of True Love"	July 30, 1937	All the Year Round	
"Freddie, Go Play"	August 20, 1937	All the Year Round	
"Days like this"	September 3, 1937		
"Effable Scrutable English"	September 10, 1937		
"The Twist of Tongues"	September 17, 1937		
"Man's Place In The Animal Kingdom"	November 26, 1937		
"Something in the way of Pajeeps, Madam?"	June 10, 1938		
"Passing Through"	July 1, 1938	Best Short Stories of 1939	
"Beginning Of A Journey"	September 2, 1938	All the Year Round	
"An accident in the field"	November 25, 1938	All the Year Round	
"Rhymes For Our Budding Bards"	December 23, 1938		
"For want of a better word"	March 17, 1939		
"Don't men know anything?"	June 30, 1939		
"You Know Irma, Don't You?"	October 13, 1939		
"A Different World"	November 17, 1939		
"The net"	January 19, 1940	•All the Year Round •Best Short Stories of 1941	
"Spring's a nice time"	May 10, 1940	All the Year Round	
"A Nice Little House With a Cistern"	June 14, 1940		
"Winter in the country"	April 4, 1941	All the Year Round	
"Snake in the Pool"	August 22, 1941	All the Year Round	
"The Hammer On the Nail"	February 13, 1942		
"Where To Dine Without Going There"	May 8, 1942		
"The darkness of the night"	August 28, 1942	All the Year Round	
"Some Salt On A Boulder"	October 23, 1942	All the Year Round	
"Winter fishing"	February 26, 1943	All the Year Round	
"Us Ohio Boys, We Wander"	March 19, 1943		
"To Forty-fourth Street"	May 21, 1943		
"I Don't Bother About Her"	August 6, 1943		
"Just An Ordinary Household"	November 26, 1943		
"Proving Something"	December 31, 1943		
"What a man would do"	August 4, 1944		
"Snowstorm in Ireland"	December 29, 1944		
"Summer Day"	July 13, 1945		
"Evening in Springfield, Mass."	September 7, 1945		
"Conversation at Midnight"	November 30, 1945		
"One Of Those Days"	July 19, 1946		
"The Sense Of Time"	March 21, 1947		
"The Hour After Westerly"	October 24, 1947	The Hour After Westerly	Made into a short film of the same name in 2019.
"The Law"	Vol. 23, No. 41: 29 Nov. 1947, pp. 41-3.	The Hour After Westerly	
"A Sail Before Dinner"	July 2, 1948		
"The Man Just Ahead of You"	August 20, 1948	The Man Just Ahead of You	
"The Return of the Gods"	December 3, 1948	The Man Just Ahead of You	
"End Quote"	August 26, 1949		
"Easy Money"	March 3, 1950		
"Will You Wait?"	June 9, 1950	The Hour After Westerly	
"Anybody Can Make A Mistake"	September 8, 1950		
"Live and Learn"	December 22, 1950		
"The Decline And Fall of Perry Whitman"	August 10, 1951	The Hour After Westerly	
"The Karpies"	October 12, 1951		
"Storm"	January 4, 1952	The Man Just Ahead of You	
"The Need"	August 22, 1952	The Hour After Westerly	
"A Friendly Game of Cards"	September 26, 1952	The Hour After Westerly	
"The Reward"	October 10, 1952	The Hour After Westerly	
"The Oracle"	April 10, 1953	The Hour After Westerly	
"An Autumn Fable"	October 2, 1953	The Hour After Westerly	
"Rendezvous"	October 16, 1953	The Hour After Westerly	
"Accident at the Inn"	June 11, 1954	The Hour After Westerly	
"In a Foreign City"	May 14, 1955	The Hour After Westerly	Adapted into an episode of Robert Montgomery Presents
"The Man Who Vanished"	October 14, 1955	The Hour After Westerly	Adapted into an episode of Robert Montgomery Presents
"Memento"	November 25, 1955	The Man Just Ahead of You	
"The Storms of Childhood"	January 20, 1956	The Hour After Westerly	
"A Parable of Love"		The Hour After Westerly	
"Return"	May 18, 1956	The Man Just Ahead of You	
"Encounter In Illinois"	May 31, 1957	The Man Just Ahead of You	
"Night Foray"	August 2, 1957		
"The Happy Hour"	October 4, 1957	The Man Just Ahead of You	
"The Citadel"	November 8, 1957	The Man Just Ahead of You	
"Getaway"	February 14, 1958	The Man Just Ahead of You	
"Afoot and Afloat in Normandy"	August 8, 1958		
"Lavalliere"	December 19, 1958		
"Theme Song"	November 20, 1959		
"Morning Exercises"	February 19, 1960		
"The Captive"	May 17, 1963	The Man Just Ahead of You	
"A Different Time, A Different Place"	September 18, 1964		
"The Setting-In of Winter"	December 1, 1967		

==== Collections ====
- All the Year Round: A Book of Stories (1943)
- The Hour After Westerly and Other Stories (1957)
- The Man Just Ahead of You (1964)

=== Non-fiction ===
==== History ====
- The Outlaw Years: The History of the Land Pirates of the Natchez Trace (1930)

==== Magazine Articles ====
- Coates, Robert (January 15, 1949). "The Art Galleries: Blume, Delaunay, Glackens". The New Yorker. Vol. 24, no. 47. pp. 48–49. Reviews Peter Blume at the Durlacher Gallery, Robert Delaunay at the Sidney Janis Gallery, and William Glackens at the Kraushaar Galleries.
- Coates, Robert (January 28, 1950). "The Art Galleries: Rembrandt and Juan Gris". The New Yorker. Vol. 25, no. 49. pp. 60, 62. Reviews Rembrandt at the Wildenstein Gallery; Gris at the Buchholz Gallery.

==== Memoir ====
- The View from Here (1960)

==== Translation ====
- Christophe Colomb by André de Hevesy as The Discoverer: A New Narrative of the Life and Hazardous Adventures of the Genoese, Christopher Columbus (1928)

==== Travel writing ====
- Beyond the Alps: A Summer in the Italian Hill Towns (1961)
- South of Rome: A Spring and Summer in Southern Italy and Sicily (1965)
