= Secession (magazine) =

Secession was an American expatriate little magazine edited by Gorham Munson, Matthew Josephson, and Kenneth Burke. During its two-year, eight issue run, Secession managed to further the careers of such writers as Waldo Frank, Slater Brown, Robert Coates, E. E. Cummings, Marianne Moore, Wallace Stevens, Hart Crane, and William Carlos Williams, among others. Printed in cities like Vienna, Berlin, Reutte, and Brooklyn, New York, Secession is considered an exile magazine, and has been called the “liveliest” of the little magazines published abroad. In his article “The Interstice between Scylla and Charybdis,” Munson distinguished Secession from little magazines like The Little Review and Broom, and stated that the goal for his magazine is to be “neither a personal nor an anthological magazine, but to be a group organ. [Secession] will make group-exclusions, found itself on a group basis, point itself in a group-direction, and derive its stability and correctiveness from a group.” The pieces published in this magazine certainly demonstrated creative energy, but the strained relationship between Secession’s editors also contributed to the magazine's spirited image.

== History ==
In 1922, Munson, who was greatly influenced by Malcolm Cowley's essay “This Youngest Generation,” desired to launch a little magazine. It was around this time that Munson met Matthew Josephson and Malcolm Cowley, and together, they formed Secession, a little magazine that would help the Younger Generation of writers “secede” from the Middle Generation; Munson supplied the funds, Josephson the literary connection, and Cowley the intellectual stimulus. Taking advantage of the favorable, post- World War I exchange rate between the American dollar and European currency, Munson printed the first issue of Secession (Spring 1922) in Vienna for under $20. In this issue, Munson stated that “beyond a two-year span, observation shows, the vitality of most reviews is lowered and their contribution, accomplished, becomes repetitious and unnecessary. Secession will take care to avoid morbidity.”

After the magazine's second issue, Munson decided to return to America, and selected Josephson to handle Secession’s European affairs as his official coeditor, and Kenneth Burke joined the team as the magazine’s third editor effective its fourth issue “in order that any disagreement might be settled by vote.” The third issue's costs were still low, costing approximately $25 to print. The 32 page Secession, which “never sold over 150 copies (though about 320 were distributed gratis)” managed to “stir up controversy,” and reviews for the magazine appeared in publications like The Dial, The Little Review, The New York Times, and The Criterion.

== Editorial feuds ==
Munson's review was successful thus far, but the contents of the fourth issue, edited by Munson, Josephson, and Burke, would act as the instigator of a well-known literary feud. Josephson, perturbed that Burke and Munson outvoted him, took it upon himself to condense one of Richard Ashton's greatest poems, which he objected to publishing, from about one hundred lines down to three. This action deeply angered Munson, and their feud caused Josephson to resign from his post and join the Broom camp. After the fallout, Secession was not published again for several months, but in the meantime, Munson and Burke spread stories to their contemporaries that Josephson “was an intellectual fakir." The magazine's sixth issue also saw editorial squabbling, this time between Munson and John Brooks Wheelwright. Wheelwright oversaw the printing of this issue in Florence, and radically altered Hart Crane's poem “For the Marriage of Faustus and Helen,” which greatly angered Munson. The poem was reprinted in Secession no. 7, which Munson edited himself, as the version originally written by Crane.

== The end ==
Munson edited Secession’s last two issues himself, and in April 1924, the magazine ended in accordance with his prophetic statement in Secession no. 1. Although Secession did not introduce any new writers, it did “reinforce and strengthen the rebel fight against the sentimental genteel tradition."
