= Marjorie Content =

American photographer

- Born: 1895; New York City, U.S.
- Died: 1984 (aged 88–89)
- Occupation: Photographer
- Years active: c. 1926–1935
- Known for: Modernist photography
- Spouse(s): Harold Loeb (m. 1914; div. 1923); Michael Carr; Leon Fleischman (div. 1934); Jean Toomer (m. 1934; his death 1967)

Marjorie Content (1895–1984) was an American photographer from New York City active in modernist social and artistic circles. Her photographs were rarely published and never exhibited in her lifetime. Since the late 20th century, collectors and art historians have taken renewed interest in her work. Her photographs have been collected by the Metropolitan Museum of Art and the Chrysler Museum of Art; her work has been the subject of several solo exhibitions.

She was married several times, including for a short period to Harold Loeb, a writer and the editor of the avant-garde journal, Broom. Her marriage to writer Jean Toomer in 1934 lasted more than 30 years, to his death.

== Early years ==
Marjorie Content was born into an ethnic German-Jewish family in New York in 1895, the daughter of wealthy Manhattan stock-broker Harry Content and his wife Ada. She was educated at the private Miss Finch's School, founded on the Upper East Side in 1900. During these years, she met Alfred Stieglitz, the uncle of a school friend, and they became lifelong friends. He was a prominent artist, photographer, and gallery owner.

In 1914, Content left school at age 19 to marry writer Harold Loeb, also of New York. She moved with him to Alberta, Canada, where he had been working on a ranch. Their two children, Jim and Susan Loeb, were born there in quick succession in 1915 and 1916.

After the United Kingdom declared war on Germany in the Great War, the couple could not stay in Canada as foreigners and returned to the United States. Loeb worked in San Francisco for a time with a business of his maternal Guggenheim relatives. He entered the Army when the United States entered the world war. Due to poor eyesight, Loeb was assigned to a desk job in New York City.

In 1919, Content became a manager of The Sunwise Turn bookshop, a female-run bookstore devoted to new writing. Her husband was a part owner and also worked there. In 1921 Loeb founded Broom, a literary magazine, which deepened Content's connections to the literary and art world. One of his partners, Lola Ridge, the magazine's American editor, hosted artists in the office of Broom, which was located in the basement of Content's brownstone townhouse.

Content and Loeb separated in 1921, and their divorce became final in 1923. Loeb moved to Rome and published Broom there, later moving the magazine to Berlin.

== Photographic years (1926–1935) ==
Content began serious photography while married to her second husband, the painter Michael Carr. She used a 3 1/4 × 4 1/4 inch Graflex, and, after 1932, a 5x7 inch Graflex as well. Despite reports that Stieglitz taught her developing techniques, some scholars believe it was her friend Consuelo Kanaga. Content sometimes worked in Kanaga's darkroom.

Her travels in the West and Southwest with painter Gordon Grant influenced her style toward a more formalist aesthetic. She briefly worked for the Bureau of Indian Affairs photographing rural Native American life. She married a third time, to Leon Fleischman.

In the 1930s Content was also close to painter Georgia O'Keeffe. In 1933 she traveled with her to Bermuda to nurse her through a depression. The following year, she drove with her to New Mexico, where O'Keefe had settled. Other close friends of this period included Stieglitz, Ridge, Sherwood Anderson, Paul Rosenfeld, and Margaret Naumburg, at whose Walden School in New York City both of her children were educated.

== Later life ==
In September 1934, one day after her divorce from Leon Fleischman was completed, Content married widowed writer Jean Toomer in Taos, New Mexico. A resident of New York City in the 1920s and 1930s, Toomer was of mixed-race ancestry and determined to be known as "an American." He was best known for his modernist novel, Cane (1923), an exploration of black culture in the Deep South and urban North. For the decade before his marriage to Content, he had been deeply involved in studying the ideas of Georges Gurdjieff. They brought Toomer's two-year-old daughter to live with them in their family.

One scholar describes Content's marriage to Toomer as "a doomed alliance," blaming it for the end of her years of serious art-making. She did not continue with making many photographs.

The couple continued to visit New Mexico together. In 1940 they settled on a farm in rural Bucks County, Pennsylvania near Doylestown. They bought it with Content's money from her father. They maintained many connections with friends from New York, as this area was popular as a retreat for artists and writers from the city, and it had summer theater nearby in New Hope. The couple became active in reviving the local Quaker meeting. The two were married until Toomer's death in 1967.

== Reappraisal of Content's work ==
Content rarely published her photographs and never exhibited. Since the late 20th century and the rise of appreciation of photography and women artists, her work has become of interest to collectors and art historians. Her photographs have been collected by the Metropolitan Museum of Art and the Chrysler Museum of Art. Solo exhibitions have been based on her and her works.
