= Hotel La Perla =

Hotel in Pamplona, Spain

- Interactive map of the Hotel La Perla area

General information
- Type: Hotel
- Location: Pamplona, Spain
- Coordinates: 42.8177°N 1.643°W
- Opened: 1881
- Owner: Miguel and Teresa Graz (original)

Website
- www.granhotellaperla.com

Hotel La Perla (Spanish: Gran Hotel La Perla) is a five-star hotel in Pamplona, Spain and is located in the Plaza del Castillo (Castle Square), with one side facing Estafeta Street, which is a main route in the Running of the Bulls. The balconies of the hotel are among the most coveted sites from which to view the event.

== History ==
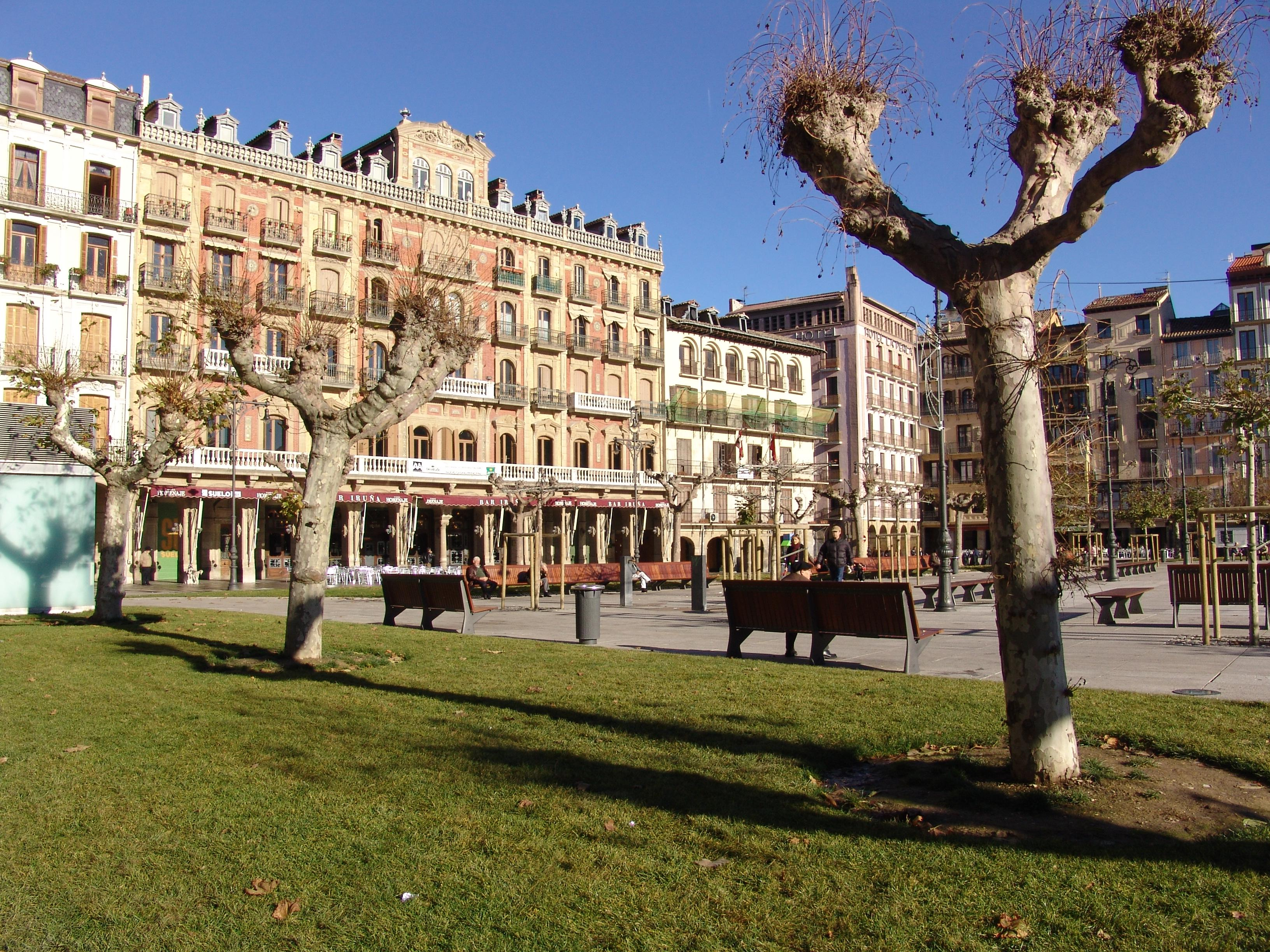
Plaza del Castillo (Castle Square) with Hotel La Perla

Opened on June 5, 1881, it is the city's oldest hotel, and the oldest still in operation in the country. It was originally named Fonda [a] La Perla. The original owners were Miguel and Teresa Graz. Miguel was a chef and Teresa was from Burguete, a village in the Pyrenees. A few months after being established, the hotel moved a few doors down to its current location.

During a major cholera epidemic in Pamplona in the summer of 1885, the hotel was the only establishment that dared to stay open. It provided food to the military hospital for infectious diseases. Miguel died of cholera during the epidemic, after which time Teresa continued to operate the business.

In 2007, the hotel was completely renovated.

== Famous guests ==
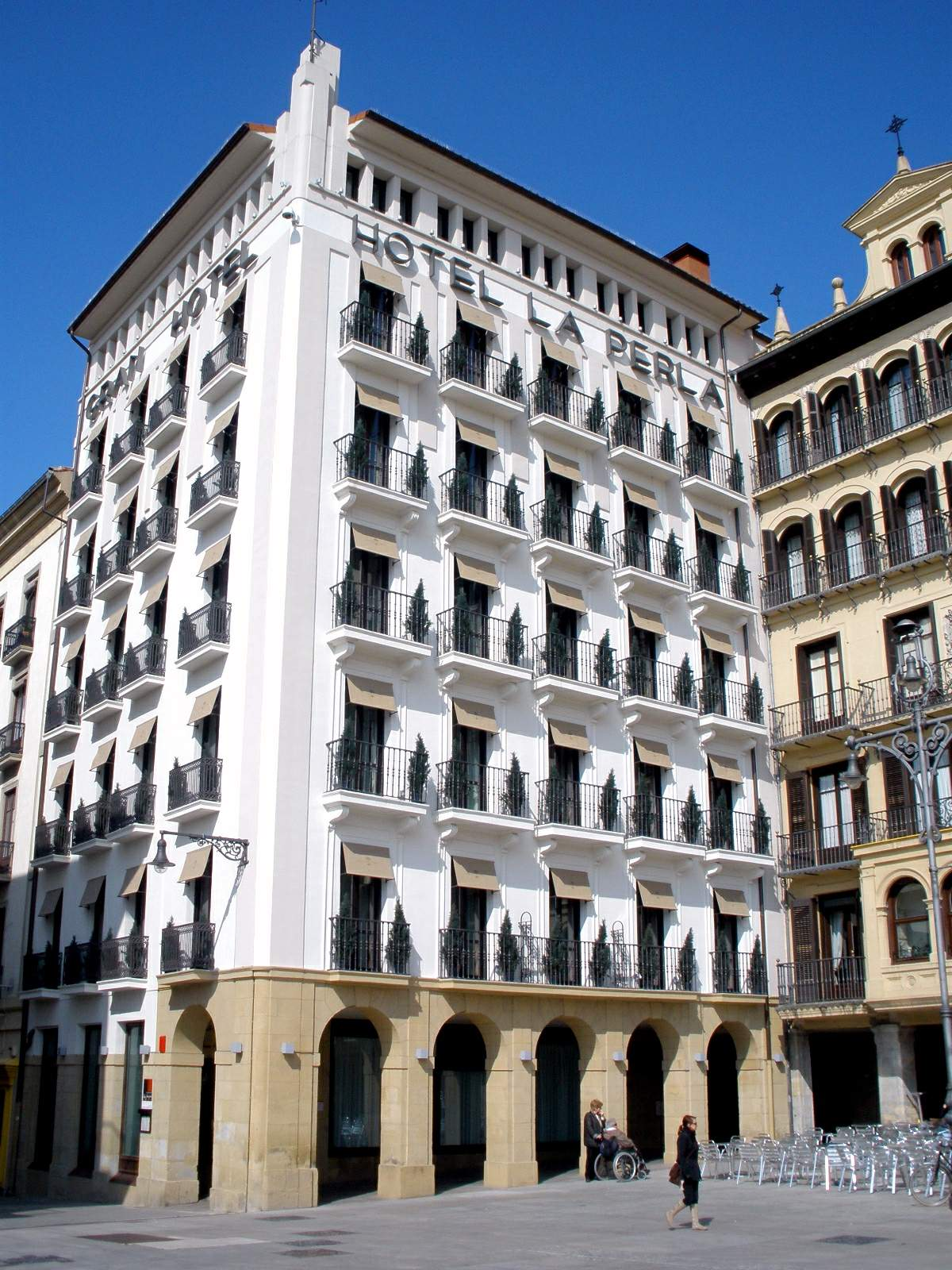

The hotel was popularized by having many notable guests, including Orson Welles, Charlie Chaplin, George Gissing and Pablo Sarasate. In the studies about Hemingway, author of The Sun Also Rises, and in popular lore, it is sometimes mistakenly identified as the model for the novel's Hotel Montoya. Hotel Montoya was actually inspired by Juanito Quintana's hotel.
