= Yesterday's Burdens =

1933 novel by Robert M. Coates

Yesterday's Burdens is the second novel of American writer and short story writer Robert M. Coates. It was published in 1933 by the Macaulay Company in New York. The novel is experimental in form and contains a variety of texts in a variety of styles. A nearly plotless novel, its storyline is centered on the narrator's recent move to the countryside. Like an exile, the narrator feels severed from New York City and is obsessed with his other self, his urban self, which he has left behind and turned his back on.

Like Coates's first novel The Eater of Darkness, Yesterday's Burdens does not simply describe, but aesthetically summons up a particular socio-cultural moment in history, as seen and experienced by a spectator-participant. Where The Eater of Darkness had mirrored the literary climate of Paris in the early 1920s, Yesterday's Burdens focuses on New York City in the early years of the Depression. The novel's literary form and style displays Coates's conviction that “the art-form is, inevitably, no more than the esthetic embodiment of the social form of the life it expresses.”

In Yesterday's Burdens Coates creates an "esthetic embodiment" of New York City that would convey the social, psychological and existential conditions of metropolitan life. All is geared to express the intensely demanding aspects of the city on the artist. The inclusion of various mass materials in his text – advertising slogans, brand names, products, newspaper headlines, markers in subway stations, traffic signs as well as fragments of conversations and remarks – was essential to the writer's aim to document the city's sights, its sounds and its systems. Coates's impressive city-pictures follow each other as in a verbal slide show. Together they form a collage of images that “ma[k]e a sound to the eyes,” as Gertrude Stein once described Coates's sense-impressions.

Yesterday's Burdens was republished in 1975 by the Lost American Fiction Series and in 2020 by the Tough Poets Press.
