= L'Estaque, Melting Snow =

Painting by Paul Cézanne

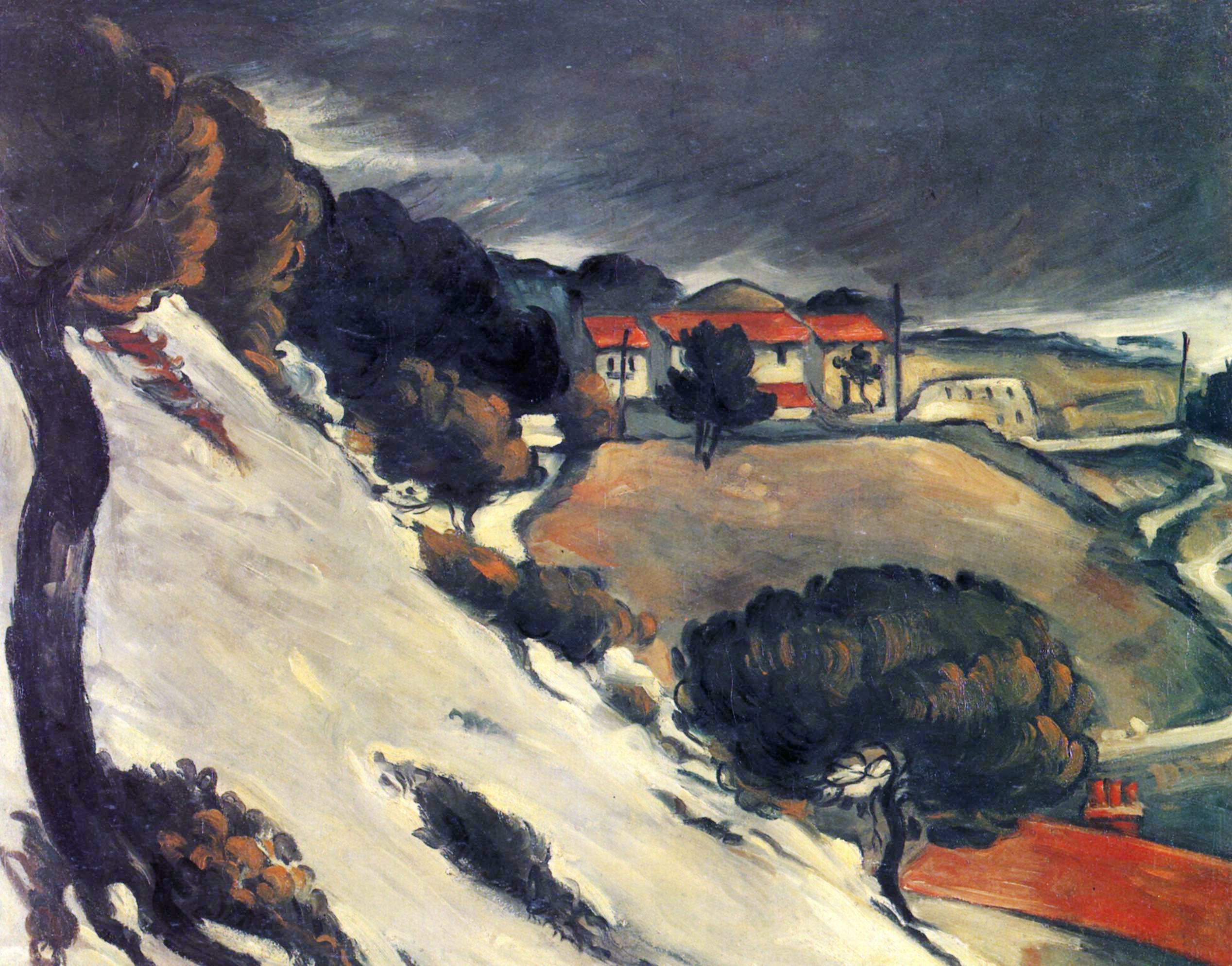
- Artist: Paul Cézanne
- Year: c. 1871
- Medium: Oil on canvas
- Dimensions: 28.75 cm × 36.25 cm (11.32 in × 14.27 in)
- Location: Private collection

L'Estaque, Melting Snow is a c. 1871 oil-on-canvas painting by French Post-Impressionist artist Paul Cézanne. It shows a view from the outskirts of L'Estaque, a small village near Marseille, with a steep hillside covered in a drift of melting snow underneath a foreboding dark grey sky.

Filled with intense emotion, the painting has been described as similar to the work of Vincent van Gogh the following decade, and the painting is formally similar to early 20th-century than contemporaneous art. L'Estaque, Melting Snow was painted in a single session. It is one of only two snow-laden winter subjects Cézanne painted.

== Background ==
Cézanne moved to Provence in 1870 to evade military service during the Franco-Prussian War. He soon moved to L'Estaque, where he painted a number of landscapes. Critics differ in their interpretation of this painting; some see it as wholly personal, others as a response to the war with Prussia. Supporting the latter view, Anna-Teresa Tymieniecka saw the painting as making a statement on social and political transformation and wrote of the political context in which it was created, "what is our response to those red-roofed houses which are held, as if in a vice, between a leaden sky and a sliding block of snow?"

== Description ==
The colors are oppressively dark, while the thickly painted, quick brushwork adds to the urgent violence of the scene. With the exception of the red rooftops and the greens of the trees in the foreground, the colours and the tones are monotonous and gloomy. The whites, greys and blacks are used mostly for emotional impact. Though L'Estaque, Melting Snow evidences Cézanne's new-found facility in depicting the deep space of a landscape, it is marked by an emotional intensity closer in spirit to the turbulence of his early figure works than to the structural complexity of the later landscape paintings.

The diagonal of the hill cuts across the painting from left to right, dividing avalanche on one side and gloom on the other. The hill sweeps down until it rests just above the red roof of a barely visible house at its foot—an effect that art critic Meyer Schapiro described as giving "a rushing force to the image." The dark brown trees on the slope's ledge have twisted trunks and rest on unsteady ground, while the trees in the mid-ground are painted in black and form a descending arch which moves inwards towards the centre of the canvas before merging with the ominous overhanging clouds. Given the angle of the hill and the depth from which the houses are viewed, it is difficult to imagine where the observer is supposed to be positioned.

Writer Ronald Berman drew comparison between Cézanne's treatment of this landscape and the way Ernest Hemingway imbues the Irati River in Navarre with emotional scope in his 1926 novel on the Lost Generation, The Sun Also Rises. In both, the landscape is subjective and the viewpoint of the observer is paramount—the landscape is representational and perceived differently by each character. According to Berman, "The foreground is the observer's space". In the Cézanne, nature becomes an extension of the observer's mental landscape, and in Hemingway it is a representation of each viewer's need for inclusion within the natural order.

== See also ==
- List of paintings by Paul Cézanne

== Sources ==
- Adriani, Götz. Cézanne Paintings. Harry N. Abrams., Inc., 1995. ISBN 0-8109-4026-4
- Athanassoglou-Kallmyer, Nina. Cézanne and Provence. University of Chicago Press, 2003. ISBN 0-226-42308-5
- Schapiro, Meyer. Cézanne. Harry N. Abrams, 2004. ISBN 0-8109-9146-2
- Tymieniecka, Anna-Teresa. Analecta Husserliana, Volume 81 Springer Publishing, 2001. ISBN 978-1-4020-1709-4
