= Duff Twysden =

British socialite

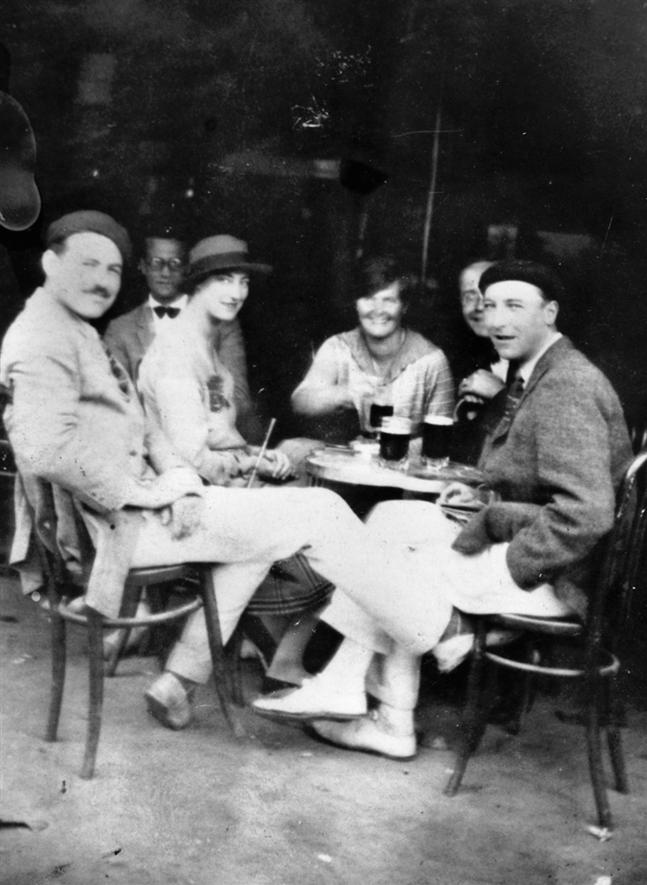
- Ernest Hemingway (left), with Harold Loeb, Duff Twysden (in hat), Hadley Richardson, Donald Ogden Stewart (obscured), and Pat Guthrie (far right) at a café in Pamplona, Spain, July 1925. Twysden, Loeb, Guthrie and Stewart inspired the characters Brett Ashley, Robert Cohn, Mike Campbell and Bill Gorton in The Sun Also Rises.

Mary Duff Stirling Smurthwaite, Lady Twysden (22 May 1891 – 27 June 1938) was a British socialite best known for being the model for Brett Ashley in Ernest Hemingway's 1926 novel The Sun Also Rises.

She was the eldest child of Baynes Wright Smurthwaite by his wife Charlotte Lilias Stirling. On 4 January 1914 her engagement to John Churchill Craigie, son of Pearl Richards Craigie, was announced, but her first marriage was to Edward Luttrell Grimston Byrom, son of Edward Byrom DL of Culver, Devon and Kersal Cell, Lancashire, who served as High Sheriff of Devon in 1888, by his wife Florence Maria, daughter and co-heiress of Marmaduke Jerard Grimston, of Grimston Garth and Kilnwick. Luttrell Byrom petitioned for divorce in 1915 citing one G. Henderson as a co-respondent. Her second marriage was at Edinburgh on 26 January 1917, to Sir Roger Thomas Twysden, a naval officer. He had succeeded as tenth Baronet on 1 May 1911, so Duff became known as Lady Twysden. Their son Anthony, later eleventh Baronet, was born on 11 March 1918.

Sir Roger and Lady Twysden were divorced in 1926. Duff Twysden eventually married artist Clinton King. She died in Santa Fe, New Mexico of tuberculosis when she was forty-seven.

Twysden was famous for adopting a boyish, androgynous fashion style, with a bobbed haircut and workingmen's clothes, before this was fashionable. She was also sexually adventurous without apology at a time when this was scandalous.

In the 1988 miniseries Hemingway, starring Stacy Keach, Duff Twysden was played by Fiona Fullerton.
