= Harold Loeb =

American writer (1891–1974)

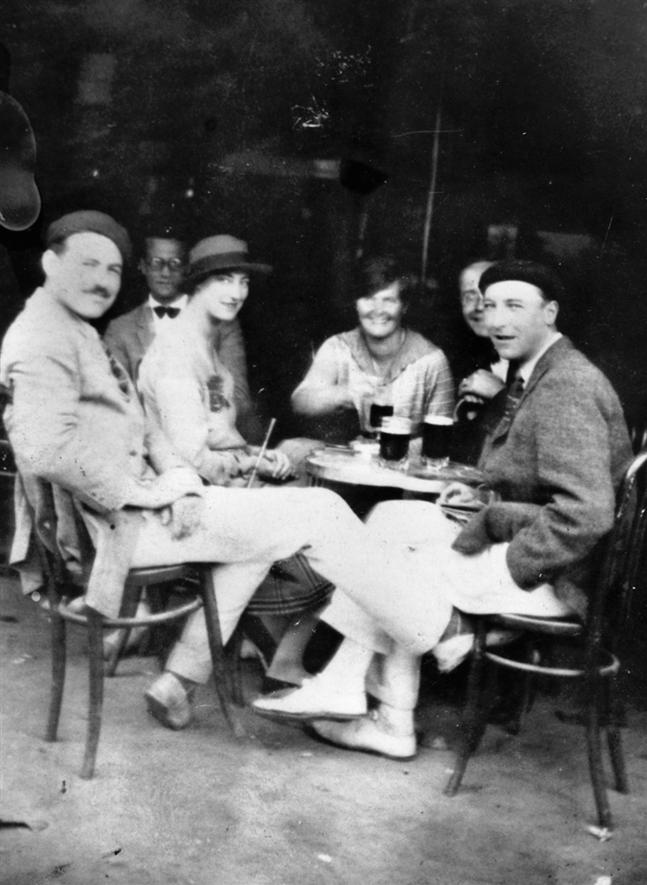
L.t.r. sitting: Ernest Hemingway, Harold Loeb, Lady Duff Twysden (with hat), Hadley, Don Stewart (obscured) and Pat Guthrie during the July 1925 trip to Spain that inspired The Sun Also Rises

Harold Albert Loeb (October 18, 1891 – January 20, 1974) was an American writer, notable as an important American figure in the arts among expatriates in Paris in the 1920s. In 1921 he was the founding editor of Broom, an international literary and art magazine, which was first published in New York City before he moved the venture to Europe. Loeb published two novels while living in Paris in the 1920s, and additional works after returning to New York in 1929.

== Early life, education, marriage and the Great War ==
Harold Albert Loeb was born into a wealthy ethnic German Jewish family in New York City. His mother Rose was a member of the Guggenheim family; one of his cousins was Peggy Guggenheim. His father Albert was a successful investment banker with Kuhn, Loeb & Company. The young Loeb attended Princeton University, where he earned his B.A. in 1913. After earning his degree, he moved to Empress, Alberta, Canada, working on a ranch and later laying concrete for the Canadian Pacific Railway.

In 1914, Loeb returned to New York, where he married Marjorie Content, daughter of a wealthy stockbroker and his wife. They returned to a rural life in Alberta for a period, where their son and daughter were born in 1915 and 1916, respectively.

The United Kingdom's declaration of war on Germany made it impossible for Loeb to continue working as a foreigner in Canada. In 1917, the family returned to New York. The next year, Loeb moved to San Francisco, where he worked for the Guggenheims as a purchaser for the American Smelting and Refining Company. When the United States entered the war, Loeb joined the military. Due to poor eyesight, he was not sent overseas and assigned to a desk job in New York.

== Sunwise Turn Bookstore and Broom ==
After the First World War, Loeb became partial owner in New York of the bookstore The Sunwise Turn. While working at the Sunwise Turn, he met several young writers, including F. Scott Fitzgerald, Laurence Vail, and Malcolm Cowley.

He also met his future business partners Alfred Kreymborg and Lola Ridge. They started their office for Broom in the basement of Loeb's wife's brownstone. In 1921, Loeb convinced Kreymborg to become a joint partner and publish Broom magazine. Loeb sold his share of the Sunwise Turn bookstore and moved to Rome to begin publication of the magazine in Europe.

Loeb separated from Marjorie Content in 1921, and their divorce was completed in 1923.

== Editorial vision ==
In the May 1922 issue of Broom, Loeb published his essay, "Foreign Exchange," which defined his editorial vision. After this, Loeb began publishing more American writers, including John Dos Passos, Laurence Vail, E. E. Cummings, Gorham Munson, Robert Coates and Matthew Josephson. In September 1922, Loeb published the article, "The Mysticism of Money." In October 1922, Loeb announced the magazine's move to Berlin, a center of artistic activity in Europe. In March 1923, Loeb left Broom and moved to Paris to work on his own writing.

== Paris ==
While in Paris, Loeb spent time with numerous American expatriates, writers and artists, including Ernest Hemingway. He had a brief affair with Duff Twysden. Hemingway later used them as inspiration for the characters Robert Cohn and Lady Brett Ashley, respectively, in his roman à clef, The Sun Also Rises. In his 1959 memoir, Loeb later wrote about this period, and of being involved in boxing and bullfights with Hemingway.

Loeb published his first two novels, Doodab (1925) and The Professors Like Vodka (1927) while living in Paris. He continued to write, publishing his third novel Tumbling Mustard in 1929, the year that he returned to New York City.

== Later years ==
Loeb published two non-fiction books in the 1930s, addressing the United States' political and social issues during the Great Depression. One of these (Life in a Technocracy) attest his adherence to technocratic ideals before he and the founder of the ideology, Howard Scott, parted ways over differences in their vision of the future for the movement and his personal criticism of Scott's leadership. He published a memoir, The Way It Was (1959). In the 1960s, he published essays about writers Ford Madox Ford and Hemingway, and about their times in Paris. He also wrote a review of Carlos Baker's 1969 biography of Hemingway. In 1969, he edited an anthology of work published originally in Broom.

Loeb married and divorced three more times after his marriage to Marjorie Content. In addition to his brief affair with Duff Twysden, he was involved with Kathleen Eaton Cannell. Continuing to travel frequently, he died of a heart attack in Marrakesh on January 20, 1974.

== Published books ==
- Doodab. New York: Boni & Liveright, 1925.
- The Professors Like Vodka. New York: Boni & Liveright, 1927.
- Tumbling Mustard. New York: Boni & Liveright, 1929.
- Life in Technocracy, What it Might be Like. New York: Viking, 1933.
- The Chart of Plenty: A Study of America's Product Capacity Based on the Findings of the National Survey of Potential Product Capacity. New York: Viking, 1935.
- The Way It Was. New York: Criterion, 1959.
- The Broom Anthology. Ed. Harold Loeb. Pound Ridge, New York: Milford House, 1969.

== Articles ==
- "Foreign Exchange," Broom, 2 (May 1922): 176–81.
- "The Mysticism of Money" Broom, 3 (September 1922): 115–30.
- "Ford Madox Ford's The Good Soldier; A Critical Reminiscence," Carleton Miscellany, 6 (Spring 1965): 27–41.
- "Hemingway's Bitterness," Connecticut Review, 1 (October 1967): 7–27
- "Review of Ernest Hemingway A Life Story by Carlos Baker," Southern Review, 5 (Autumn 1969): 1214–1225.
