= Kathleen Eaton Cannell =

American dancer

Kathleen Eaton Cannell (usually known as Kitty Cannell) (1891 – 1974) was a Paris-based American dance and fashion correspondent for major U.S. papers and periodicals. Before moving to Paris she was the dance critic for The Christian Science Monitor. During the years of World War I she was a dancer and performed under the stage name of 'Rihani', inventing a dance style called 'static dances'.

She was a well-known figure in the American community of artists in Paris in the 1920s. She was briefly married to the poet Skipwith Cannell but divorced him in the spring of 1921, later marrying French poet Roger Vitrac. William Carlos Williams describes her thus: "Kitty Cannell in her squirrel coat and yellow skull cap, which made the French, man and woman, turn in the street and stare seeing a woman, approaching six feet, so accoutered". She had an affair with Harold Loeb and they socialized with Ernest Hemingway and his wife Hadley. In A Farewell to Arms Hemingway based the character Helen Ferguson on Kitty, and also the character Frances Clyne in The Sun Also Rises, although she denied this, but a reading of her letters to Loeb indicates strong parallels with the story.

She became the Paris fashion correspondent for The New Yorker, and, during the German occupation, reported on occupying forces' press conferences for the New York Times.

Her only book was Jam Yesterday, a memoir of her childhood, which was spent shuttling back and forth between the U.S. and Canada. It was published by William Morrow & Company in 1945. Her papers are held at Harvard University's Houghton Library.

== External Resources ==
- Papers of Kathleen Cannell, Houghton Library, Harvard University

== Sources ==
- Robert Karoly Sarlos, Jig Cook and the Provincetown Players: Theatre in Ferment, University of Massachusetts Press, 1982
- Humphrey Carpenter, Geniuses Together: American Writers in Paris in the 1920s, Unwin Hyman, 1987. ISBN 0-04-440067-5 (see pp. 101, 153, 183)
- Bertram D. Sarason, Hemingway and 'The Sun' set NCR / Microcard Editions, 1972
- James J Wilhelm, Ezra Pound in London and Paris 1908-1925 Penn State Press, 1990. ISBN 0-271-00682-X (see p. 301)
