= Lola Ridge =

Irish-American poet (1873–1941)

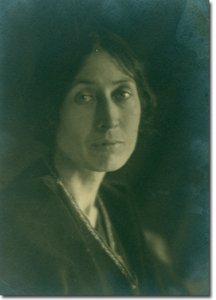
- Born: Rose Emily Ridge; 12 December 1873; Dublin
- Died: 19 May 1941 (aged 67)
- Writing career
- Genre: Poetry
- Notable awards: Guggenheim Fellowship, Shelley Memorial Award
- Literary movement: Greenwich Village

Lola Ridge (born Rose Emily Ridge; 12 December 1873 – 19 May 1941) was an Irish-born New Zealand-American anarchist and modernist poet, and an influential editor of avant-garde, feminist, and Marxist publications. She is best known for her long poems and poetic sequences, published in numerous magazines and collected in five books of poetry.

Along with other political poets of the early Modernist period, Ridge has received renewed critical attention since the late 20th century and has been lauded by contemporary poets for her choice and ability to write about urban spaces in her poems. A selection of her poetry was published in 2007, and a biography, Anything That Burns You: A Portrait of Lola Ridge, Radical Poet (by Terese Svoboda) was published in 2016.

== Early life ==
Rose Emily Ridge was born in 1873 in Dublin, Ireland, to Emma Ridge (née Reilly) and Joseph Henry. She was her parents' only surviving child. John Henry died when Ridge was three-years-old, and Ridge and her mother subsequently emigrated to Hokitika, New Zealand, when she was six-years-old. In 1895, she married Peter Webster, the manager of a Hokitika gold mine. In 1903 she left Webster and moved to Sydney, Australia with their three-year-old son Keith to attend Trinity College and study painting at the Sydney Art School with Julian Ashton.

After her mother died, Ridge emigrated to the United States in 1907 and reinvented herself as Lola Ridge, a poet and painter. She settled in San Francisco and published in Overland Monthly. Ridge placed her son in a Californian orphanage and moved to New York City's Greenwich Village. Working as a model for artists, in a factory and as a poet and illustrator, she became involved in working class politics and protests, and worked with Emma Goldman and Margaret Sanger. Her first book of poetry was published in 1918. On 22 October 1919, Ridge married David Lawson, a fellow radical.

== Literary career ==
Ridge sent a collection of her poems entitled Verses (1905) inspired by her childhood in Hokitika to A.G. Stephens at the Sydney Bulletin, but he declined to publish the collection. In 1918, Ridge gained considerable notice with her long poem, The Ghetto, first published in The New Republic. It was included in her first book, The Ghetto and Other Poems, published that year. The title poem portrays the Jewish immigrant community of Hester Street on the Lower East Side of Manhattan, where Ridge lived for a time. It explores the effects of capitalism, gender, and generational conflict in ways that bear comparison to the works of Charles Reznikoff. In addition, Ridge gave an empathetic portrayal of America's urban masses and immigrant communities. The book was a critical success.

This recognition led to opportunities for Ridge; she became involved with and edited new avant-garde magazines such as Others in 1919, and Broom, founded in 1921 by Harold Loeb, for which she was the American editor from 1922 to 1923, while he published in Rome. While working with Loeb, she had an apartment next to the basement office of Broom in the townhouse of his estranged wife Marjorie Content. As part of her work at Others, Ridge gave a lecture tour in 1919 on "Women and the Creative Will," arguing that traditional gender roles were a form of patriarchal control used to suppress female creativity.

Ridge published 61 poems from 1908 to 1937 in such leading magazines as Poetry, New Republic, The Saturday Review of Literature and Mother Earth. She was a contributing editor to The New Masses.

She wrote and published four more books of poetry through 1935, and single poems into 1937. Her collections include The Ghetto, and Other Poems (1918), Sun-up, and Other Poems (1920), Red Flag (1927), Firehead (1930), and Dance of Fire (1935). Her work was also collected in anthologies. Her third book, Red Flag (1927) collected much of her political poetry.

In 1929, Ridge was accepted for a residency at the writers colony of Yaddo. That year she published Firehead, a long poem that was a radical retelling of Jesus' crucifixion. It and her last book, published in 1935 were more philosophical compared to her earlier work.

She was awarded a Guggenheim Fellowship in 1935. She received the Shelley Memorial Award from the Poetry Society of America in 1934 and 1935. Publishing until 1937, she died in Brooklyn in 1941 of pulmonary tuberculosis.

== Political activities ==
Ridge did not join any political party, but was active in radical causes. She protested against the executions of Sacco and Vanzetti in 1927, and was among those arrested that day. In the 1930s, she supported the defence of Tom Mooney and Warren Billings, who had been framed for a 1916 bombing at the Preparedness Day Parade in San Francisco.

Her actions during the demonstration in front of the prison on the day Sacco and Vanzetti were executed were described by Katherine Anne Porter in her long essay, "The Never Ending Wrong." She wrote, "One tall, thin figure of a woman stepped out alone, a good distance into the empty square, and when the police came down at her and the horse's hoofs beat over her head, she did not move, but stood with her shoulders slightly bowed, entirely still. The charge was repeated again and again, but she was not to be driven away. A man near me said in horror, suddenly recognizing her, 'That's Lola Ridge!' and dashed into the empty space toward her. Without any words or a moment's pause, he simply seized her by the shoulders and walked her in front of him back to the edge of the crowd, where she stood as if she were half-conscious. I came near her and said, 'Oh no, don't let them hurt you! They've done enough damage already.' And she said, 'This is the beginning of the end – we have lost something we shan't find again.' I remember her bitter hot breath and her deathlike face."

Peter Quartermain described her in the Dictionary of Literary Biography as "the nearest prototype in her time of the proletarian poet of class conflict, voicing social protest or revolutionary idealism."

== Works ==
- The Ghetto, and Other Poems, Huebsch, 1918.
- Sun-Up, and Other Poems, Huebsch, 1920
- Red Flag, Viking, 1927.
- Firehead, Payson & Clarke, 1929.
- Dance of Fire, Smith & Haas, 1935.
- Daniel Tobin, ed. (2007). Light in Hand: Selected Early Poems. Quale Press. ISBN 978-0-9792999-1-9.
- Collected Early Works of Lola Ridge (ed. Daniel Tobin) Little Island Press, 2018.

== Legacy and honours ==
- 1935 Guggenheim Fellowship in poetry
- 1934 and 1935, Ridge won the Shelley Memorial Award, given by the Poetry Society of America
- Her papers are held at Smith College.

== Renewed scholarly interest ==
With renewed scholarly interest in Ridge's work since the late 20th century, selections from her first three books of poetry were published posthumously as, Light in Hand: Selected Early Poems (2007), edited and with an introduction by Daniel Tobin. Tobin notes that Ridge was, "part of the confluence of politics, culture and the burgeoning of women's voices at the advent of modernism to the start of World War II." Furthermore, Tobin highlights the importance of Ridge's depiction of urban settings in contrast to other modernist writers like Ezra Pound or T.S. Eliot. For Ridge, the modern city becomes a "community shaped by ritual and mutual need rather than an exposé of modern angst and alienation and dissipation."

Robert Pinsky, former Poet Laureate of the United States, wrote that contemporary readers need, "to appreciate the magnitude and freshness of her enterprise: to make poetry out of the actual city." Pinsky likens Ridge to 18th-century British poet William Blake in her ability to express the perspective of children, evoking, "innocence and experience in a way that blurs the ambiguous boundary between them." Pinsky also notes that Ridge preceded American Hart Crane, known for his long poem The Bridge about the Brooklyn Bridge, in her assigning "ecstatic, high language of the past, especially of the Elizabethans, to the squalid and the sublime realities of the actual, 20th-century American city."

== Quotation ==
My doll Janie has no waist
and her body is like a tub with feet on it.
Sometimes I beat her
but I always kiss her afterwards.
When I have kissed all the paint off her body
I shall tie a ribbon about it
so she shan't look shabby.
But it must be blue –
it mustn't be pink –
pink shows the dirt on her face
that won't wash off.

I beat Janie
and beat her...
but still she smiled...
so I scratched her between the eyes with a pin.
Now she doesn't love me any more...
she scowls... and scowls...
though I've begged her to forgive me
and poured sugar in the hole at the back of her head.

-- from Sun-Up and Other Poems
