= Juanito Quintana =

Spanish hotelier (1891–1974)

Juan Quintana Urra
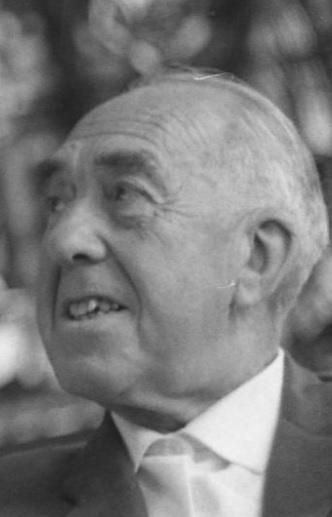
- Juanito Quintana
- Born: November 5, 1891; Pamplona, Spain
- Died: January 27, 1974 (aged 82); Pamplona, Spain
- Occupation: Hotelier
- Known for: His association with Ernest Hemingway

Juan Quintana Urra (1891–1974) was a Spanish hotelier, bullfight businessman, and activist in the Spanish Republic. He was the basis for the character Juanito Montoya in Ernest Hemingway's 1926 novel The Sun Also Rises.

== Life in Pamplona ==
Quintana was born in Pamplona, Spain, in 1891, the eldest of three children of Ignacio Quintana Barreneche and Saturnina Urra Vizcar. His father worked as a postman. Quintana opened the Quintana Hotel at 18 Plaza del Castillo in Pamplona. The bullfighters who came to Pamplona usually stayed in the hotel. Juanito Quintana was a big aficionado and worked as an entrepreneur organizing bullfights. Between 1926 and 1930, he was president of Club Taurino in Pamplona.

Quintana married Juana Mantecón Iturri (1911–1999), who had been a waitress at his hotel, and they had a son, Juan.

== Spanish Civil War and World War II ==
During the Second Spanish Republic, Quintana was a prominent Republican sympathizer and political organizing often took place in his hotel. In July 1936, at the beginning of the Spanish Civil War, Quintana and his wife were away from Pamplona, because they were gone to Mont-de-Marsan to see bullfights, which saved him from being a victim of repression against Republicans, but his hotel was requisitioned by the new authorities and he could never get it back. He settled for some years in France, where his brother Alberto ran a hotel in the town of Biarritz. In 1941, both brothers were able to return to Spain and settled in San Sebastián. During World War II Alberto Quintana was part of the Comet line, which helped Allied soldiers and airmen return to Britain during the Second World War after crossing the Basque-Navarre border on the way to Gibraltar.

== Friendship with Ernest Hemingway ==
Juanito Quintana is known for his friendship with the writer Ernest Hemingway. In 1924, when Hemingway was in Madrid, the bullfighting critic Rafael Hernandez advised him to go to the festival of San Fermin in Pamplona and stay at the Hotel Quintana, where he could enjoy the best bullfighting atmosphere. He did, and Hemingway and Quintana struck up a close friendship that only ended with the writer's death. Hemingway stayed at the Hotel Quintana on his visits to Pamplona in 1924, 1925, 1926, 1927, 1929 and 1931. Quintana appears embodied in the character of Juanito Montoya, owner of the Hotel Montoya in the novel The Sun Also Rises of 1926.

In the 1950s, after a long absence from Spain, Hemingway returned and resumed their relationship. The Hotel Quintana no longer existed, but Juanito Quintana arranged accommodation on their visits to Pamplona in 1953 and 1959, and accompanied Hemingway in his travels through several cities, united by their love of bullfighting. Hemingway refers to him in Death in the Afternoon: "Quintana, the best aficionado and most loyal friend in Spain, and with a fine hotel with all the rooms full."

== Bibliography ==
- James A. Michener, Iberia: Spanish Travels and Reflections, NY: Random House, 1968.
- José María Iribarren, Hemingway y los Sanfermines, Pamplona: Gómez, 1970.
- M.C. Rintoul, Dictionary of Real People and Places in Fiction, London: Routledge, 1993.
- Miguel Izu, Hemingway en los sanfermines, Pamplona: Ediciones Eunate, 2019. Hemingway in Pamplona, translation by Martin Roberts, Amazon, 2021.
