= Broom: An International Magazine of the Arts =

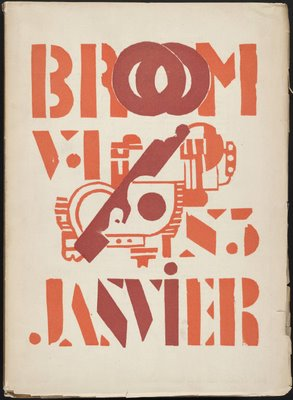
Cover from the third issue of Broom, January 1922; woodcut by Fernand Léger

Broom: An International Magazine of the Arts was a little magazine founded by Harold Loeb and Alfred Kreymborg and published from November 1921 to January 1924. Initially, the magazine was printed in Europe, first in Rome and then in Berlin, with the intention of bringing new, avant-garde art back to the U.S.

Loeb later claimed he no longer remembered why he choose the name Broom, but they had gone through a list of one-syllable words and "broom" was the only one left. Ostensibly, the title of the magazine coalesced with the stated focus in the first issue, publishing "the unknown, path-breaking artist", allowing the new artist the opportunity to sweep away the old.

== Background ==
Loeb, the son of two powerful New York Jewish families (the Guggenheims on his Mother's side and the Loebs on his father's side) met Kreymborg while he owned a partnership in the Sunwise Turn bookstore. Loeb eventually sold his interest in the bookstore and convinced Kreymborg, who had previously edited Others: A Magazine of the New Verse, to help him start a little magazine. The two collected some American writing and left for Europe in June 1921. The magazine was headquartered in Europe, first in Rome, later in Berlin, to take advantage of the cheaper printing costs and favorable exchange rate as well as to gain access to European and expatriate art. Loeb ran the magazine in Rome with Nathaniel Shaw operating as the New York editor who had to acquire American submissions and to handle the importing of the magazine to the U.S.

== History ==
=== Rome (November 1921 – November 1922) ===
Loeb and Kreymborg began working on the first issue in August; it was published in November and sold for fifty cents a copy or five dollars for a year subscription. Loeb was pleased with the quality of the paper, the large margins, and the quality of the art reproductions and illustrations; however, he felt that the magazine lacked originality and a clear focus. The first few issues contained few lesser-known artists, while including submissions from Amy Lowell, Conrad Aiken, Wallace Stevens, and Sherwood Anderson. The magazine also contained notable artwork by Picasso, Jacques Lipchitz, Joseph Stella, and Man Ray. While working on the third issue, Loeb and Kreymborg clashed over financial and editing issues, which resulted in Loeb dismissing Kreymborg and buying him out of his share in the magazine.

Loeb took over the main editing duties in the Rome office and in April 1922 he replaced Shaw, the New York editor, with Lola Ridge. Shaw was held responsible for the shipping problems to the U.S. that were hampering the magazine's finances. In the May issue Loeb published his article, "Foreign Exchange", which took a more positive view of American industrialization. At the same time, Loeb began a correspondence with Matthew Josephson, who also supported the aesthetic within industrialization and was an editor of Secession, a rival expatriate little magazine. Loeb latter published Josephson's response to his essay entitled "Made in America." Their friendship culminated in Loeb moving the magazine to Berlin and Josephson becoming an editor of Broom.

=== Berlin (November 1922 – March 1923) ===
Even before the move to Berlin, Loeb and the magazine were on shaky financial ground; Loeb and Josephson struggled to make Broom a success while also striving to create a unique voice for the magazine. During this period, the magazine published work by Jean Toomer, Hart Crane, and Marianne Moore. Additionally, Loeb and Josephson attempted to strengthen their focus toward what came to be known as "skyscraper primitivism", a term for the championing of the aesthetic in industrialization that Josephson and Loeb forwarded; Loeb considered the term a simplistic misnomer. In March, Loeb left for New York to gain some investors for the magazine; however, he returned empty handed, which forced the magazine to cease publication. Josephson felt that Broom had at least 3000 loyal readers and wanted to try to continue publishing. Loeb left to focus on his career as a novelist, but told Josephson that he could attempt to resurrect Broom.

=== New York (August 1923 – January 1924) ===
In August 1923, Josephson, with the help of Malcolm Cowley and Slater Brown, restarted the magazine in New York. The American version of Broom was greatly scaled down from the European versions. Josephson reduced the quality of the paper, trimmed the margins, and lessened the pages to sixty-four. Nevertheless, Josephson was able to publish five issues with work from William Carlos Williams E.E. Cummings, Toomer, and artist Juan Gris. The magazine continued to struggle financially and when the U.S. postal service seized the January edition for obscenity, due to a narrative, "Prince Llan", by Kenneth Burke, which mentions "breast" in the plural, Broom was forced to cease publication due to the lack of funds.

== Reception and legacy ==
The initial reception of Broom was mixed as evidenced by the attacks toward the magazine such as those published in The Dial, which attacked Loeb in relation to his financial background. Due to his family connections, many assumed that the magazine had a large financial backing and characterized Broom as a product of the wealthy elite. Despite these attacks, Broom had a readership of around 4000, which was quite substantial for a little magazine. The importance of the magazine has also been debated, with Frederick Hoffman claiming that "Broom was not an important magazine" and "was not particularly pioneering." Alternatively, Craig Monk sees Broom and other expatriate magazines as helping "make hospitable to Americans the foreign centers of modernism." While Broom may have suffered from a lack of originality or editorial focus, the magazine definitely played a major role in exposing European modernism to U.S.

== Broom ==
- Broom: An International Magazine of the Arts. Published by Americans in Italy. Vol. 1, No. 1, November 1921 – Vol. 6, Mo. 1, January 1924. Edited by Harold A.Loeb, Alfred Kreymborg, Slater Brown, Matthew Josephson and Malcolm Cowley (associate editors), Lola Ridge (American editor). Published by The Broom Publishing Company, Rome and New York.

Reprints

- Broom. An International Magazine of the Arts. Kraus Reprints, New York 1967. 5 Vols.
- The Broom Anthology. Edited, with an introduction by Harold Loeb. Milford House, Pound Ridge, New York 1969.

== Bibliography ==
- "Comment." The Dial. May 1921: 606. Web. American Periodicals Series Online. 5 March 2010.
- "Harold Loeb." Dictionary of Literary Biography Vol. 4. Ed. Karen. Detroit, Michigan: Gale, 1980. Literature Resource Center. Web. 2 March 2010
- Gauthier, Ambre. "La revue Broom, An International Magazine of the Arts (1921–1924)", La Revue des revues, n°45, Paris, Ent’revues, mars 2011, p. 70–84.
- Gauthier, Ambre. "Broom, An International Magazine of the Arts (1921–1924): une revue d’avant-garde américaine", Les cahiers de l’Ecole du Louvre, n°3, octobre 2013, p. 24–35.
- Hoffman, Frederick J., Charles Allen, and Carolyn F. Ulrich. The Little Magazine: A History and a Bibliography. Princeton: Princeton UP, 1946. 101–107. Print
- Kondritzer, Jeffry B. "Broom: An International Magazine of the Arts." Diss. Indiana
- University, 1984. Web. Dissertation Abstracts Online. 15 February 2010.
- Loeb, Harold. Broom. New York: Kraus Reprint, 1921. Print.
- --. "Broom: Beginning and Revival." Connecticut Review 4.1 (1970): p5-12. Print.
- --. The Way It Was. New York: Criterion Books, 1959. Print.
- Monk, Craig. "Modernism in Transition: The Expatriate American Magazine in Europe between the World Wars." Miscellanea: A Journal of English and American Studies 20 (1999): 55–72.
- Murphy, Russell. "Alfred Kreymborg." Dictionary of Literary Biography Vol. 54. Ed. Peter Quartermain. Detroit: Gale Research, 1987. Literature Resource Center. Web. 2 March 2010.
- Shi, David E. "Matthew Josephson." Dictionary of Literary Biography Vol. 4. Ed. Karen Lane
- Rood. Detroit: Gale Research, 1980. Literature Resource Center. Web. 2 March 2010.
- --."Matthew Josephson and Broom: Cultural Nationalism in the Jazz Age." Southern Review 19.3 (1983): 573–595. Print.
