= The Sun Also Rises =

1926 novel by Ernest Hemingway

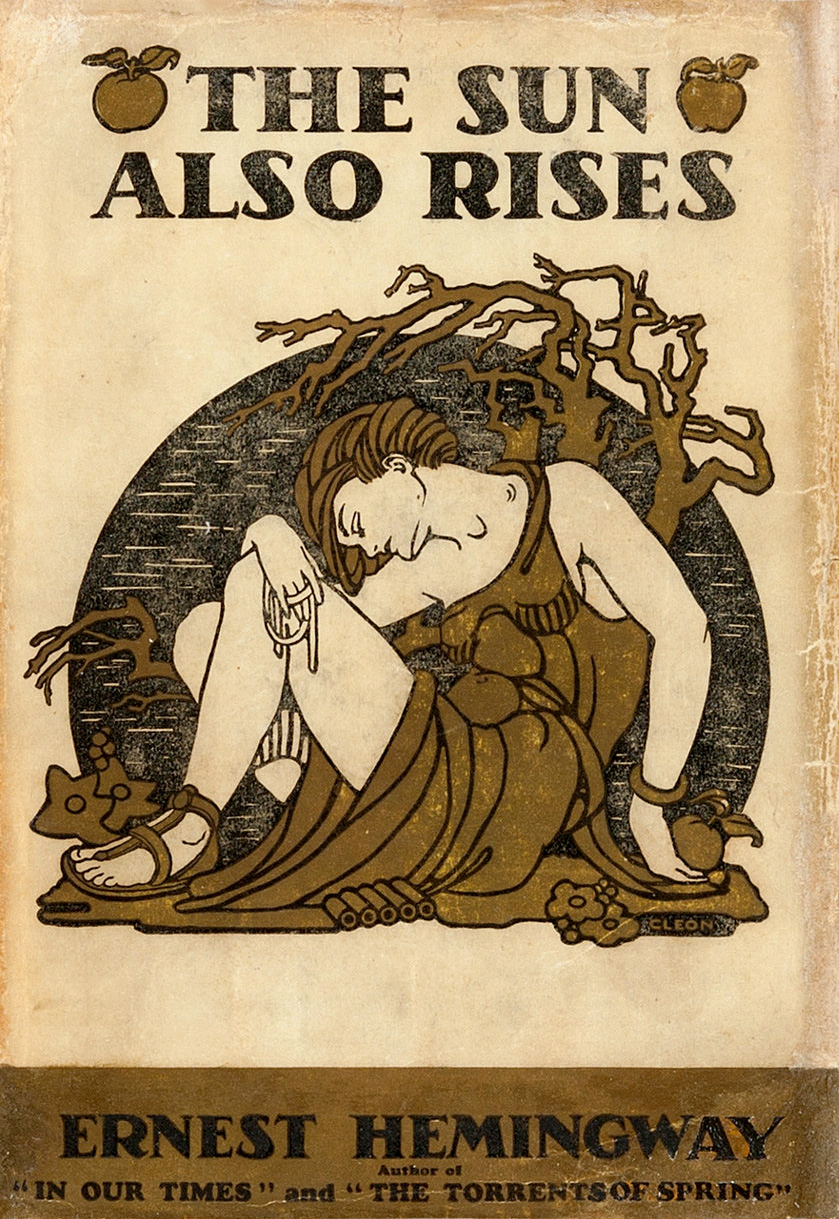
The first edition of The Sun Also Rises, published in 1926 by Scribner's, with dust jacket illustrated by Cleo Damianakes. The Hellenistic jacket design "breathed sex yet also evoked classical Greece".

The Sun Also Rises is the first novel by the American writer Ernest Hemingway, following his experimental novel-in-fragments In Our Time (1925). It portrays American and British expatriates who travel from Paris to the Festival of San Fermín in Pamplona and watch the running of the bulls and the bullfights. An early modernist novel, it received mixed reviews upon publication. Hemingway biographer Jeffrey Meyers writes that it is now "recognized as Hemingway's greatest work", and Hemingway scholar Linda Wagner-Martin calls it his most important novel. The novel was published in the United States in October 1926, by Charles Scribner's Sons. A year later, Jonathan Cape published the novel in London under the title Fiesta. It remains in print.

The novel is a roman à clef: the characters are based on people in Hemingway's circle and the action is based on events, particularly Hemingway's life in Paris in the 1920s and a trip to Spain in 1925 for the Pamplona festival and fishing in the Pyrenees. Hemingway converted to Catholicism as he wrote the novel, and Jeffrey Herlihy-Mera notes that protagonist Jake Barnes, a Catholic, was "a vehicle for Hemingway to rehearse his own conversion, testing the emotions that would accompany one of the most important acts of his life."

Hemingway presents his notion that the "Lost Generation"—considered to have been decadent, dissolute and irretrievably damaged by World War I—was in fact resilient and strong. Hemingway investigates the themes of love and death, the revivifying power of nature, and the concept of masculinity. His sparse writing style, combined with his restrained use of description to convey characterizations and action, demonstrates his "iceberg theory" of writing.

== Plot summary ==
On the surface, the novel is a love story between the protagonist Jake Robert Barnes—a man whose war wound has made him unable to have sex—and the promiscuous divorcée Lady Brett Ashley. Jake is an expatriate American journalist living in Paris, while Brett is a twice-divorced Englishwoman with bobbed hair and numerous love affairs, and embodies the new sexual freedom of the 1920s. Brett's affair with Jake's Princeton friend Robert Cohn (whom the characters often refer to by his last name) causes Jake to be upset and break off his friendship with Cohn; her seduction of the 19-year-old matador Romero causes Jake to lose his good reputation among the Spaniards in Pamplona.

Book One is set in the café society of young American expatriates in Paris. In the opening scenes, Jake plays tennis with Cohn, picks up a prostitute named Georgette, and runs into Brett and Count Mippipopolous in a nightclub. Later, Brett tells Jake she loves him, but they both know that they have no chance at a stable relationship.

In Book Two, Jake is joined by Bill Gorton, recently arrived from New York, and Brett's fiancé Mike Campbell, who arrives from Scotland. Jake and Bill travel south and meet Cohn at Bayonne for a fishing trip in the hills northeast of Pamplona. Instead of fishing, Cohn stays in Pamplona to wait for the overdue Brett and Mike. Cohn had an affair with Brett a few weeks earlier and still feels possessive of her despite her engagement to Mike. After Jake and Bill enjoy five days of fishing the streams near Burguete, they rejoin the group in Pamplona.

All begin to drink heavily. Cohn is resented by the others, who taunt him with antisemitic remarks. During the fiesta, the characters drink, eat, watch the running of the bulls, attend bullfights, and bicker. Jake introduces Brett to the 19-year-old matador Romero at the Hotel Montoya; she is smitten with him and seduces him. The jealous tension among the men builds—Jake, Mike, Cohn, and Romero each want Brett. Cohn, who had been a champion boxer in college, has a fistfight with Jake and Mike, and another with Romero, whom he beats up. Despite his injuries, Romero continues to perform brilliantly in the bullring.

Book Three shows the characters in the aftermath of the fiesta. Sober again, they leave Pamplona; Bill returns to Paris, Mike stays in Bayonne, and Jake goes to San Sebastián on the northern coast of Spain. As Jake is about to return to Paris, he receives a telegram from Brett asking for help; she had gone to Madrid with Romero. He finds her in a cheap hotel, without money, and without Romero. She announces she has decided to go back to Mike. The novel ends with Jake and Brett in a taxi speaking and thinking of what might have been.

== Themes and analysis ==
=== Paris and the Lost Generation ===
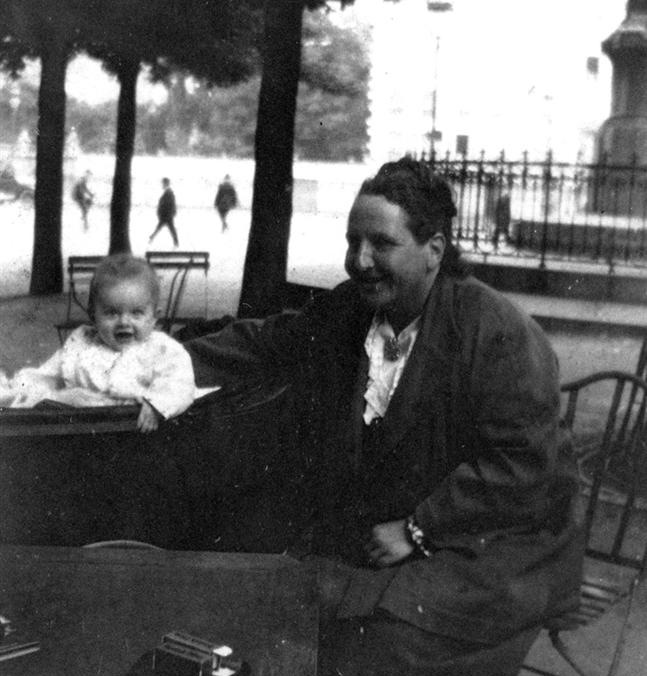
Gertrude Stein in 1924 with Hemingway's son Jack. She coined the phrase "Lost Generation".

The first book of The Sun Also Rises is set in mid-1920s Paris. Americans were drawn to Paris in the Roaring Twenties by the favorable exchange rate, with as many as 200,000 English-speaking expatriates living there. The Paris Tribune reported in 1925 that Paris had an American Hospital, an American Library, and an American Chamber of Commerce. Many American writers were disenchanted with the US, where they found less artistic freedom than in Europe. For example, Hemingway was in Paris during the period when Ulysses, written by his friend James Joyce, was banned and burned in New York.

The themes of The Sun Also Rises appear in its two epigraphs. The first is an allusion to the "Lost Generation", a term coined by Gertrude Stein referring to the post-war generation; (Note: Hemingway may have used the term as an early title for the novel, according to biographer James Mellow. The term originated from a remark in French made to Gertrude Stein by the owner of a garage, speaking of those who went to war: "C'est une génération perdue" (lit. 'they are a lost generation'). See Mellow (1992), 309.) the other epigraph is a long quotation from Ecclesiastes: "One generation passeth away, and another generation cometh: but the earth abideth for ever. The sun also ariseth, and the sun goeth down, and hasteth to his place where he arose." Hemingway told his editor Max Perkins that the book was not so much about a generation being lost, but that "the earth abideth forever." He thought the characters in The Sun Also Rises may have been "battered" but were not lost.

Hemingway scholar Wagner-Martin writes that Hemingway wanted the book to be about morality, which he emphasized by changing the working title from Fiesta to The Sun Also Rises. Wagner-Martin argues that the book can be read either as a novel about bored expatriates or as a morality tale about a protagonist who searches for integrity in an immoral world. Months before Hemingway left for Pamplona, the press was depicting the Parisian Latin Quarter, where he lived, as decadent and depraved. He began writing the story of a matador corrupted by the influence of the Latin Quarter crowd; he expanded it into a novel about Jake Barnes at risk of being corrupted by wealthy and inauthentic expatriates.

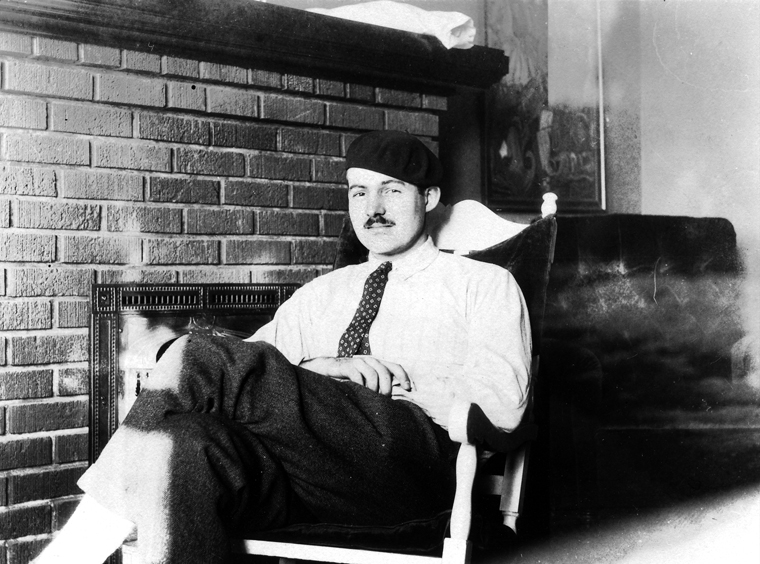
Hemingway at home in his apartment on the Left Bank, Paris, 1924

The characters form a group, sharing similar norms, and each greatly affected by the war. Hemingway captures the angst of the age and transcends the love story of Brett and Jake, although they are representative of the period: Brett is starved for reassurance and love and Jake is sexually maimed. His wound symbolizes the disability of the age, the disillusion, and the frustrations felt by an entire generation.

Hemingway thought he lost touch with American values while living in Paris, but his biographer Michael S. Reynolds claims the opposite, seeing evidence of the author's midwestern American values in the novel. Hemingway admired hard work. He portrayed the matadors and the prostitutes, who work for a living, in a positive manner, but Brett, who prostitutes herself, is emblematic of "the rotten crowd" living on inherited money. It is Jake, the working journalist, who pays the bills again and again when those who can pay do not. Hemingway shows, through Jake's actions, his disapproval of the people who did not pay up.

Reynolds says that Hemingway shows the tragedy, not so much of the decadence of the Montparnasse crowd, but of the decline in American values of the period. As such, the author created an American hero who is impotent and powerless. Jake becomes the moral center of the story. He never considers himself part of the expatriate crowd because he is a working man; to Jake a working man is genuine and authentic, and those who do not work for a living spend their lives posing.

=== Women and love ===
The twice-divorced Brett Ashley represented the liberated New Woman. In the 1920s, divorces were common and easy to be had in Paris. James Nagel writes that, in Brett, Hemingway created one of the more fascinating women in 20th-century American literature. Sexually promiscuous, she is a denizen of Parisian nightlife and cafés. In Pamplona she sparks chaos: the men drink too much and fight over her. She also seduces the young bullfighter Romero and becomes a Circe in the festival. Critics describe her variously as complicated, elusive, and enigmatic; Donald Daiker writes that Hemingway "treats her with a delicate balance of sympathy and antipathy." She is vulnerable, forgiving, independent—qualities that Hemingway juxtaposes with the other women in the book, who are either prostitutes or overbearing nags.

Nagel considers the novel a tragedy. Jake and Brett have a relationship that becomes destructive because their love cannot be consummated. Conflict over Brett destroys Jake's friendship with Robert Cohn, and her behavior in Pamplona affects Jake's hard-won reputation among the Spaniards. Meyers sees Brett as a woman who wants sex without love while Jake can only give her love without sex. Although Brett sleeps with many men, it is Jake she loves. Dana Fore writes that Brett is willing to be with Jake in spite of his disability, in a "non-traditional erotic relationship." Other critics such as Leslie Fiedler and Nina Baym describe her as a 'bitch'; Baym sees Brett as one of the "outstanding examples of Hemingway's 'bitch women.'" Jake becomes bitter about their relationship, as when he says, "Send a girl off with a man .... Now go and bring her back. And sign the wire with love."

Critics interpret the Jake–Brett relationship in various ways. Daiker suggests that Brett's behavior in Madrid—after Romero leaves and when Jake arrives at her summons—reflects her immorality. Scott Donaldson thinks Hemingway presents the Jake–Brett relationship in such a manner that Jake knew "that in having Brett for a friend 'he had been getting something for nothing' and that sooner or later he would have to pay the bill." Daiker notes that Brett relies on Jake to pay for her train fare from Madrid to San Sebastián, where she rejoins her fiancé Mike.

In a piece Hemingway cut, he has Jake thinking, "you learned a lot about a woman by not sleeping with her." By the end of the novel, although Jake loves Brett, he appears to undergo a transformation in Madrid when he begins to distance himself from her. Reynolds believes that Jake represents the "everyman," and that in the course of the narrative he loses his honor, faith, and hope. He sees the novel as a morality play with Jake as the person who loses the most.

=== The corrida, the fiesta, and nature ===
Hemingway, in white trousers and dark shirt, fighting a bull in the amateur recortes at Pamplona fiesta, July 1925

In The Sun Also Rises, Hemingway contrasts Paris with Pamplona, and the frenzy of the fiesta with the tranquillity of the Spanish countryside. Spain was among Hemingway's favorite European countries; he considered it a healthy place, and the only country "that hasn't been shot to pieces." He was profoundly affected by the spectacle of bullfighting, writing

It isn't just brutal like they always told us. It's a great tragedy—and the most beautiful thing I've ever seen and takes more guts and skill and guts again than anything possibly could. It's just like having a ringside seat at the war with nothing going to happen to you.

He demonstrated what he considered the purity in the culture of bullfighting—called afición—and presented it as an authentic way of life, contrasted against the inauthenticity of the Parisian bohemians. To be accepted as an aficionado was rare for a non-Spaniard; Jake goes through a difficult process to gain acceptance by the "fellowship of afición."

Allen Josephs thinks the novel is centered on the corrida (the bullfighting), and how each character reacts to it. Brett seduces the young matador; Cohn fails to understand and expects to be bored; Jake understands fully because only he moves between the world of the inauthentic expatriates and the authentic Spaniards; the hotel keeper Montoya is the keeper of the faith; and Romero is the artist in the ring—he is both innocent and perfect, and the one who bravely faces death. The corrida is presented as an idealized drama in which the matador faces death, creating a moment of existentialism or nada (nothingness), broken when he vanquishes death by killing the bull.

Hemingway named his character Romero for Pedro Romero, shown here in Goya's 1816 etching Pedro Romero Killing the Halted Bull.

Hemingway presents matadors as heroic characters dancing in a bullring. He considered the bullring as war with precise rules, in contrast to the messiness of the real war that he, and by extension Jake, experienced. Critic Keneth Kinnamon argues that young Romero is the novel's only honorable character. Hemingway named Romero after Pedro Romero, an 18th-century bullfighter who killed thousands of bulls in the most difficult manner: having the bull impale itself on his sword as he stood perfectly still. Reynolds says Romero, who symbolizes the classically pure matador, is the "one idealized figure in the novel." Josephs says that when Hemingway changed Romero's name from Guerrita and imbued him with the characteristics of the historical Romero, he also changed the scene in which Romero kills a bull to one of recibiendo (receiving the bull) in homage to the historical namesake.

Before the group arrives in Pamplona, Jake and Bill take a fishing trip to the Irati River. As Harold Bloom points out, the scene serves as an interlude between the Paris and Pamplona sections, "an oasis that exists outside linear time." On another level it reflects "the mainstream of American fiction beginning with the Pilgrims seeking refuge from English oppression"—the prominent theme in American literature of escaping into the wilderness, as seen in Cooper, Hawthorne, Melville, Twain, and Thoreau.

Fiedler calls the theme "The Sacred Land"; he thinks the American West is evoked in The Sun Also Rises by the Pyrenees and given a symbolic nod with the name of the "Hotel Montana." In Hemingway's writing, nature is a place of refuge and rebirth, according to Stoltzfus, where the hunter or fisherman gains a moment of transcendence at the moment the prey is killed. Nature is the place where men act without women: men fish, men hunt, men find redemption. In nature Jake and Bill do not need to discuss the war because their war experience, paradoxically, is ever-present. The nature scenes serve as counterpoint to the fiesta scenes.

All of the characters drink heavily during the fiesta and generally throughout the novel. In his essay "Alcoholism in Hemingway's The Sun Also Rises", Matts Djos says the main characters exhibit alcoholic tendencies such as depression, anxiety and sexual inadequacy. He writes that Jake's self-pity is symptomatic of an alcoholic, as is Brett's out-of-control behavior. William Balassi thinks that Jake gets drunk to avoid his feelings for Brett, notably in the Madrid scenes at the end where he has three martinis before lunch and drinks three bottles of wine with lunch.

Reynolds believes the drinking is relevant as set against the historical context of Prohibition in the United States. The atmosphere of the fiesta lends itself to drunkenness, but the degree of revelry among the Americans also reflects a reaction against Prohibition. Bill, visiting from the US, drinks in Paris and in Spain. Jake is rarely drunk in Paris where he works but on vacation in Pamplona, he drinks constantly. Reynolds says that Prohibition split attitudes about morality, and in the novel Hemingway made clear his dislike of Prohibition.

=== Masculinity and gender ===
Critics have seen Jake as an ambiguous representative of Hemingway's manliness. For example, in the bar scene in Paris, Jake is angry at some homosexual men. The critic Ira Elliot suggests that Hemingway viewed homosexuality as an inauthentic way of life, and that he aligns Jake with homosexual men because, like them, Jake does not have sex with women. Jake's anger shows his self-hatred at his inauthenticity and lack of masculinity. His sense of masculine identity is lost—he is less than a man.

Elliot wonders if Jake's wound perhaps signifies latent homosexuality, rather than only a loss of masculinity; the emphasis in the novel, however, is on Jake's interest in women. Hemingway's writing has been called homophobic because of the language his characters use. For example, in the fishing scenes, Bill confesses his fondness for Jake but then goes on to say, "I couldn't tell you that in New York. It'd mean I was a faggot."

In contrast to Jake's troubled masculinity, Romero represents an ideal masculine identity grounded in self-assurance, bravery and competence. The Davidsons note that Brett is attracted to Romero for these reasons, and they speculate that Jake might be trying to undermine Romero's masculinity by bringing Brett to him and thus diminishing his ideal stature.

Critics have examined issues of gender misidentification that are prevalent in much of Hemingway's work. He was interested in cross-gender themes, as shown by his depictions of effeminate men and boyish women. In his fiction, a woman's hair is often symbolically important and used to denote gender. Brett, with her short hair, is androgynous and compared to a boy—yet the ambiguity lies in the fact that she is described as a "damned fine-looking woman." While Jake is attracted to this ambiguity, Romero is repulsed by it. In keeping with his strict moral code he wants a feminine partner and rejects Brett because, among other things, she will not grow her hair.

=== Antisemitism ===
Mike lay on the bed looking like a death mask of himself. He opened his eyes and looked at me.
"Hello Jake" he said very slowly. "I'm getting a little sleep. I've wanted a little sleep for a long time ...."
"You'll sleep, Mike. Don't worry, boy."
"Brett's got a bullfighter," Mike said. "But her Jew has gone away .... Damned good thing, what?"

— The Sun Also Rises

Hemingway has been called antisemitic, most notably because of the characterization of Robert Cohn in the book. The other characters often refer to Cohn as a Jew, and once as a 'kike'. Shunned by the other members of the group, Cohn is characterized as "different", unable or unwilling to understand and participate in the fiesta. Cohn is never really part of the group—separated by his difference or his Jewish faith.

Barry Gross, comparing Jewish characters in literature of the period, commented that "Hemingway never lets the reader forget that Cohn is a Jew, not an unattractive character who happens to be a Jew but a character who is unattractive because he is a Jew." Hemingway critic Josephine Knopf speculates that Hemingway might have wanted to depict Cohn as a "shlemiel" (or fool), but she points out that Cohn lacks the characteristics of a traditional shlemiel.

Cohn is based on Harold Loeb, a fellow writer who rivaled Hemingway for the affections of Duff, Lady Twysden (the real-life inspiration for Brett). Biographer Michael Reynolds writes that in 1925, Loeb should have declined Hemingway's invitation to join them in Pamplona. Before the trip, he was Duff's lover and Hemingway's friend; during the fiasco of the fiesta, he lost Duff and Hemingway's friendship. Hemingway used Loeb as the basis of a character remembered chiefly as a "rich Jew."

=== Disillusionment ===
The Sun Also Rises reflects the pervasive disillusionment experienced by the "Lost Generation" in the aftermath of World War I. The novel portrays a world where traditional sources of meaning—religion, work, and love—fail to provide lasting fulfillment, leaving characters trapped in cycles of dissatisfaction. Jake Barnes and his expatriate companions struggle to find purpose in a modern world marked by loss and despair. Hemingway suggests that the only viable response to this existential crisis is a stoic acceptance of life’s inherent tragedy. His sparse prose and emphasis on omission underscore the underlying themes of repressed desires and emotional detachment.

== Background ==
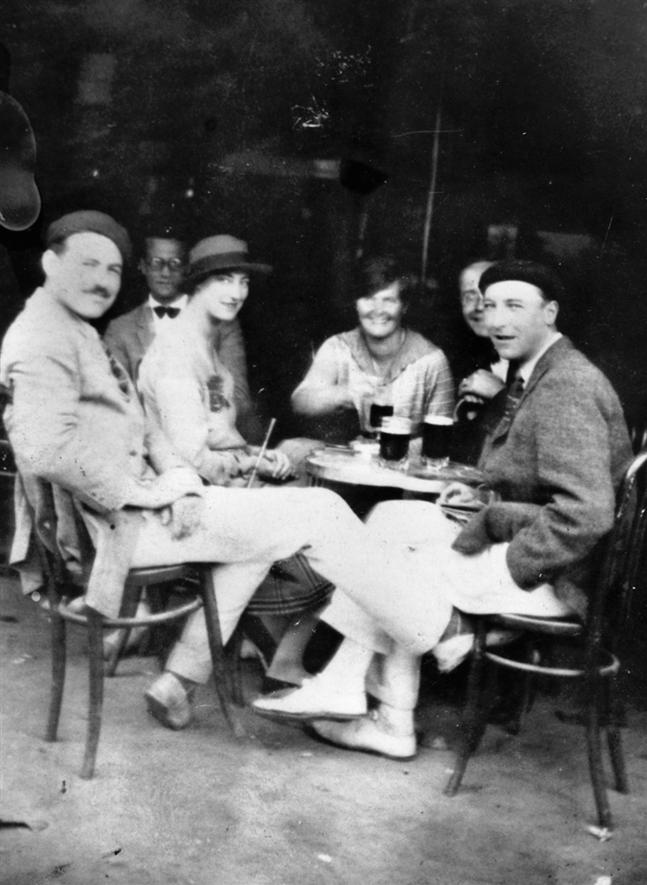
Hemingway (left), with Harold Loeb, Duff Twysden (in hat), Hadley Richardson, Donald Ogden Stewart (obscured), and Pat Guthrie (far right) at a café in Pamplona, Spain, July 1925

In the 1920s, Hemingway lived in Paris as a foreign correspondent for the Toronto Star, and traveled to İzmir to report on the Greco–Turkish War. He wanted to use his journalism experience to write fiction, believing that a story could be based on real events when a writer distilled his own experiences in such a way that, according to biographer Jeffrey Meyers, "what he made up was truer than what he remembered".

With his wife Hadley Richardson, Hemingway first visited the Festival of San Fermín in Pamplona in 1923, where he was following his recent passion for bullfighting. The couple returned to Pamplona in 1924—enjoying the trip immensely—this time accompanied by Chink Dorman-Smith, John Dos Passos, and Donald Ogden Stewart and his wife.

In June 1925, the two returned a third time and stayed at the hotel of his friend Juanito Quintana. That year, they brought with them a different group of American and British expatriates: Bill Smith, Hemingway's Michigan boyhood friend; Stewart; recently divorced Duff, Lady Twysden and her lover Pat Guthrie; and Harold Loeb. Hemingway's memory spanning multiple trips might explain the inconsistent time frame in the novel indicating both 1924 and 1925.

In Pamplona, the group quickly disintegrated. Hemingway, attracted to Duff, was jealous of Loeb, who had recently been on a romantic getaway with her; by the end of the week the two men had a public fistfight. Against this background was the influence of the young matador from Ronda, Cayetano Ordóñez, whose brilliance in the bullring affected the spectators. Ordóñez honored Hemingway's wife by presenting her, from the bullring, with the ear of a bull he killed. Outside of Pamplona, the fishing trip to the Irati River (near Burguete in Navarre) was marred by polluted water.

Hemingway had intended to write a nonfiction book about bullfighting, but then decided that the week's experiences had presented him with enough material for a novel. A few days after the fiesta ended, on his birthday (21 July), he began writing what would eventually become The Sun Also Rises. By 17 August, with 14 chapters written and a working title of Fiesta chosen, Hemingway returned to Paris. He finished the draft on 21 September 1925, writing a foreword the following weekend and changing the title to The Lost Generation.

In December 1925, Hemingway and his wife spent the winter in Schruns, Austria, where he began revising the manuscript extensively. Pauline Pfeiffer joined them in January, and—against Hadley's advice—urged him to sign a contract with Scribner's. Hemingway left Austria for a quick trip to New York to meet with the publishers, and on his return, during a stop in Paris, began an affair with Pauline. He returned to Schruns to finish the revisions in March.

In June, he was in Pamplona with both Richardson and Pfeiffer. On their return to Paris, Richardson asked for a separation, and left for the south of France. In August, alone and depressed in Paris, Hemingway considered suicide and drafted a last will, but he completed the proofs, dedicating the novel to his wife and son. After the publication of the book in October, Hadley asked for a divorce; Hemingway subsequently gave her the book's royalties.

== Publication history ==
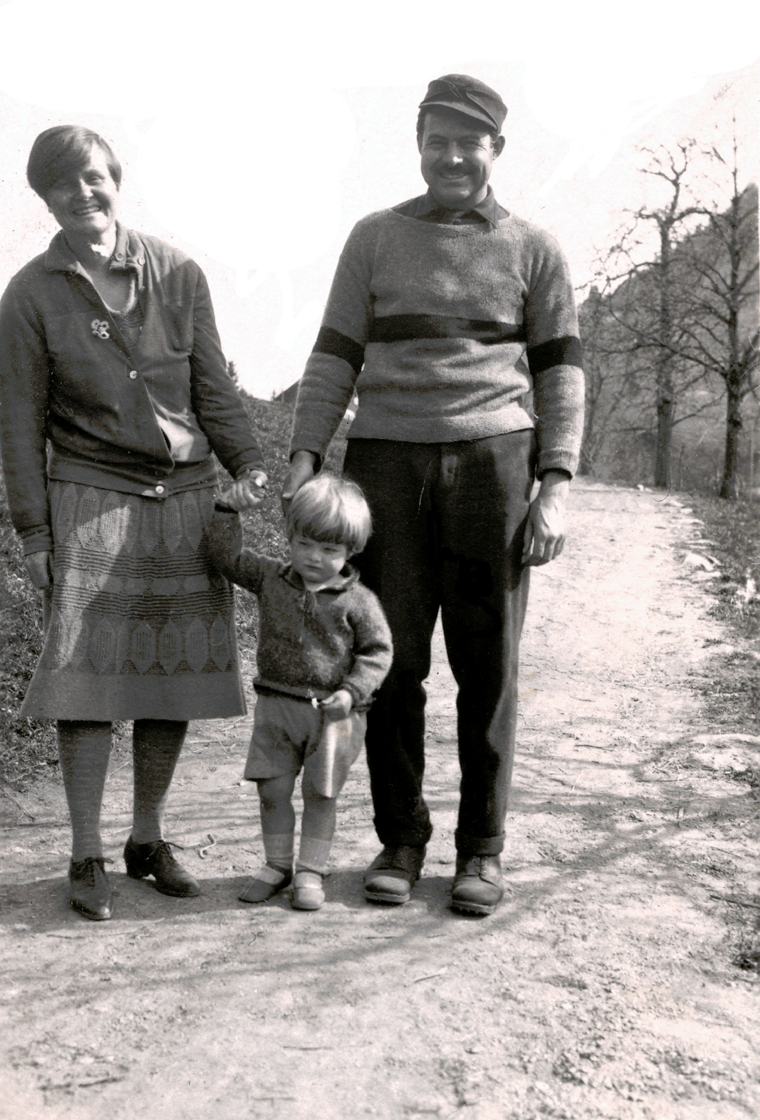
Hemingway spent December 1925 in Schruns, Austria, with Hadley and Jack. During that period he wrote The Torrents of Spring.

Hemingway maneuvered his publisher Boni & Liveright into terminating their contract with him so that The Sun Also Rises could be published by Scribner's instead. In December 1925, he quickly wrote The Torrents of Spring, a satirical novella parodying Sherwood Anderson's novel Dark Laughter, and sent it to Boni & Liveright. His three-book contract with them included a termination clause should they reject a single submission. Unamused by the satire aimed at one of their most saleable authors, Boni & Liveright immediately rejected it and terminated the contract. Within weeks Hemingway signed a contract with Scribner's, who agreed to publish The Torrents of Spring and all of his subsequent work. (Note: The Torrents of Spring has little scholarly criticism as it is considered to be of less importance than Hemingway's subsequent work. See Oliver (1999), 330.)

Scribner's published the novel on 22 October 1926. Its first edition consisted of 5,090 copies, selling at $2.00 per copy. Cleo Damianakes illustrated the dust jacket with a Hellenistic design of a seated, robed woman, her head bent to her shoulder, eyes closed, one hand holding an apple, her shoulders and a thigh exposed. Editor Maxwell Perkins intended "Cleon's respectably sexy" design to attract "the feminine readers who control the destinies of so many novels".

Two months later the book was in a second printing with 7,000 copies sold. Subsequent printings were ordered; by 1928, after the publication of Hemingway's short story collection Men Without Women, the novel was in its eighth printing. In 1927, the novel was published in the United Kingdom by Jonathan Cape, titled Fiesta, without the two epigraphs. Two decades later, in 1947, Scribner's released three of Hemingway's works as a boxed set, including The Sun Also Rises, A Farewell to Arms, and For Whom the Bell Tolls.

By 1983, The Sun Also Rises had been in print continuously since its publication in 1926, and was likely one of the most translated titles in the world. At that time, Scribner's began to print cheaper mass-market paperbacks of the book, in addition to the more expensive trade paperbacks already in print. In the 1990s, British editions were titled Fiesta: The Sun Also Rises. In 2006, Simon & Schuster began to produce audiobook versions of Hemingway's novels, including The Sun Also Rises. In May 2016, a new "Hemingway Library Edition" was published by Simon & Schuster, including early drafts, passages that were deleted from the final draft, and alternative titles for the book, which help to explain the author's journey to produce the final version of the work.

== Writing style ==
The novel is well known for its style, which is variously described as modern, hard-boiled, or understated. As a novice writer and journalist in Paris, Hemingway turned to Ezra Pound—who had a reputation as "an unofficial minister of culture who acted as mid-wife for new literary talent"—to mark and blue-ink his short stories. From Pound, Hemingway learned to write in the modernist style: he used understatement, pared away sentimentalism, and presented images and scenes without explanations of meaning, most notably at the book's conclusion, in which multiple future possibilities are left for Brett and Jake. (Note: Hemingway wrote a fragment of an unpublished sequel in which he has Jake and Brett meeting in the Dingo Bar in Paris. With Brett is Mike Campbell. See Daiker (2009), 85.) The scholar Anders Hallengren writes that because Hemingway learned from Pound to "distrust adjectives," he created a style "in accordance with the esthetics and ethics of raising the emotional temperature towards the level of universal truth by shutting the door on sentiment, on the subjective."

F. Scott Fitzgerald told Hemingway to "let the book's action play itself out among its characters." Hemingway scholar Linda Wagner-Martin writes that, in taking Fitzgerald's advice, Hemingway produced a novel without a central narrator: "Hemingway's book was a step ahead; it was the modernist novel." When Fitzgerald advised Hemingway to trim at least 2500 words from the opening sequence, which was 30 pages long, Hemingway wired the publishers telling them to cut the opening 30 pages altogether. The result was a novel without a focused starting point, which was seen as a modern perspective and critically well received.

Each time he let the bull pass so close that the man and the bull and the cape that filled and pivoted ahead of the bull were all one sharply etched mass. It was all so slow and so controlled. It was as though he were rocking the bull to sleep. He made four veronicas like that ... and came away toward the applause, his hand on his hip, his cape on his arm, and the bull watching his back going away.

— Bullfighting scene from The Sun Also Rises

Wagner-Martin speculates that Hemingway may have wanted to have a weak or negative hero as defined by Edith Wharton, but he had no experience creating a hero or protagonist. At that point his fiction consisted of extremely short stories, not one of which featured a hero. The hero changed during the writing of The Sun Also Rises: first the matador was the hero, then Cohn was the hero, then Brett, and finally Hemingway realized "maybe there is not any hero at all. Maybe a story is better without any hero." Balassi believes that in eliminating other characters as the protagonist, Hemingway brought Jake indirectly into the role of the novel's hero.

As a roman à clef, the novel based its characters on living people, causing scandal in the expatriate community. Hemingway biographer Carlos Baker writes that "word-of-mouth of the book" helped sales. Parisian expatriates gleefully tried to match the fictional characters to real identities. Moreover, he writes that Hemingway used prototypes easily found in the Latin Quarter on which to base his characters. The early draft identified the characters by their living counterparts; Jake's character was called Hem, and Brett's was called Duff.

Although the novel is written in a journalistic style, Frederic Svoboda writes that the striking thing about the work is "how quickly it moves away from a simple recounting of events." Jackson Benson believes that Hemingway used autobiographical details as framing devices for life in general. For example, Benson says that Hemingway drew out his experiences with "what if" scenarios: "what if I were wounded in such a way that I could not sleep at night? What if I were wounded and made crazy, what would happen if I were sent back to the front?" Hemingway believed that the writer could describe one thing while an entirely different thing occurs below the surface—an approach he called the iceberg theory, or the theory of omission.

If a writer of prose knows enough of what he is writing about he may omit things that he knows and the reader, if the writer is writing truly enough, will have a feeling of those things as strongly as though the writer had stated them. The dignity of movement of an ice-berg is due to only one-eighth of it being above water. A writer who omits things because he does not know them only makes hollow places in his writing.

— Hemingway explained the iceberg theory in Death in the Afternoon (1932).

Balassi says Hemingway applied the iceberg theory better in The Sun Also Rises than in any of his other works, by editing extraneous material or purposely leaving gaps in the story. He made editorial remarks in the manuscript that show he wanted to break from the stricture of Gertrude Stein's advice to use "clear restrained writing." In the earliest draft, the novel begins in Pamplona, but Hemingway moved the opening setting to Paris because he thought the Montparnasse life was necessary as a counterpoint to the later action in Spain. He wrote of Paris extensively, intending "not to be limited by the literary theories of others, [but] to write in his own way, and possibly, to fail."

He added metaphors for each character: Mike's money problems, Brett's association with the Circe myth, Robert's association with the segregated steer. It wasn't until the revision process that he pared down the story, taking out unnecessary explanations, minimizing descriptive passages, and stripping the dialogue, all of which created a "complex but tightly compressed story."

Hemingway said that he learned what he needed as a foundation for his writing from the style sheet for The Kansas City Star, where he worked as cub reporter. (Note: "Use short sentences. Use short first paragraphs. Use vigorous English. Be positive, not negative.") The critic John Aldridge says that the minimalist style resulted from Hemingway's belief that to write authentically, each word had to be carefully chosen for its simplicity and authenticity and carry a great deal of weight. Aldridge writes that Hemingway's style "of a minimum of simple words that seemed to be squeezed onto the page against a great compulsion to be silent, creates the impression that those words—if only because there are so few of them—are sacramental." In Paris, Hemingway had been experimenting with the prosody of the King James Bible, reading aloud with his friend John Dos Passos. From the style of the biblical text, he learned to build his prose incrementally. The action in the novel builds sentence by sentence, scene by scene and chapter by chapter.

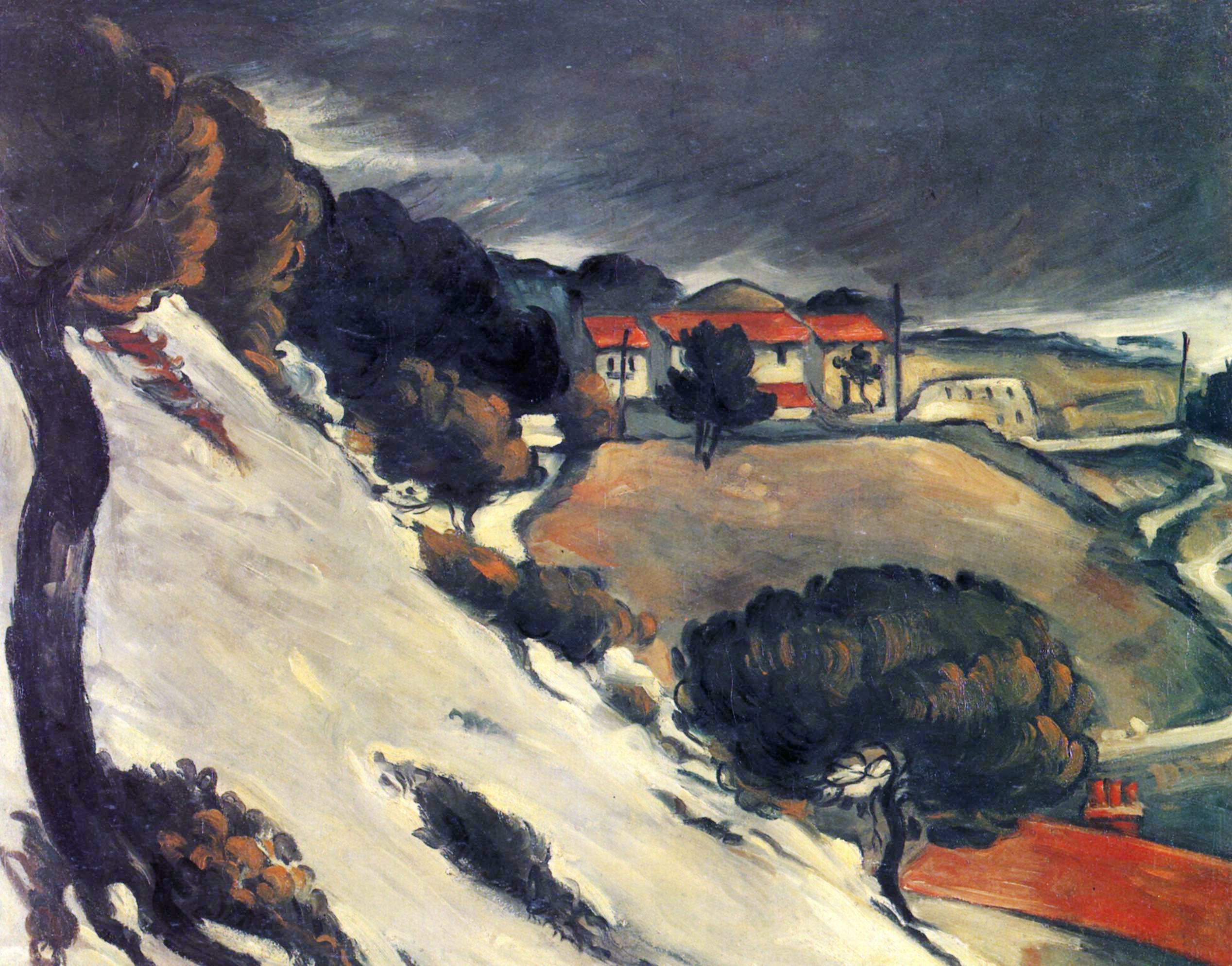
Paul Cézanne, L'Estaque, Melting Snow, c. 1871. Writer Ronald Berman draws comparison between Cézanne's treatment of this landscape and the way Hemingway imbues the Irati River with emotional texture. In both, the landscape is a subjective element seen differently by each character.

The simplicity of his style is deceptive. Bloom writes that it is the effective use of parataxis that elevates Hemingway's prose. Drawing on the Bible, Walt Whitman and Adventures of Huckleberry Finn, Hemingway wrote in deliberate understatement and he heavily incorporated parataxis, which in some cases almost becomes cinematic. His skeletal sentences were crafted in response to Henry James's observation that World War I had "used up words," explains Hemingway scholar Zoe Trodd, who writes that his style is similar to a "multi-focal" photographic reality. The syntax, which lacks subordinating conjunctions, creates static sentences.

The photographic "snapshot" style creates a collage of images. Hemingway omits internal punctuation (colons, semicolons, dashes, parentheses) in favor of short declarative sentences, which are meant to build, as events build, to create a sense of the whole. He also uses techniques analogous to cinema, such as cutting quickly from one scene to the next, or splicing one scene into another. Intentional omissions allow the reader to fill the gap as though responding to instructions from the author and create three-dimensional prose. Biographer James Mellow writes that the bullfighting scenes are presented with a crispness and clarity that evoke the sense of a newsreel.

Hemingway uses color and visual art techniques to convey emotional range in his descriptions of the Irati River. In Translating Modernism: Fitzgerald and Hemingway, Ronald Berman compares Hemingway's treatment of landscape with that of the post-Impressionist painter Paul Cézanne. During a 1949 interview, Hemingway told Lillian Ross that he learned from Cézanne how to "make a landscape." In comparing writing to painting he told her, "This is what we try to do in writing, this and this, and woods, and the rocks we have to climb over." The landscape is seen subjectively—the viewpoint of the observer is paramount. To Jake, landscape "meant a search for a solid form .... not existentially present in [his] life in Paris."

== Reception ==
Hemingway's first novel was arguably his best and most important and came to be seen as an iconic modernist novel, although Reynolds emphasizes that Hemingway was not philosophically a modernist. In the book, his characters epitomized the post-war expatriate generation for future generations. He had received good reviews for his volume of short stories, In Our Time, of which Edmund Wilson wrote, "Hemingway's prose was of the first distinction." Wilson's comments were enough to bring attention to the young writer.

No amount of analysis can convey the quality of The Sun Also Rises. It is a truly gripping story, told in a lean, hard, athletic narrative prose that puts more literary English to shame. Mr. Hemingway knows how not only to make words be specific but how to arrange a collection of words which shall betray a great deal more than is to be found in the individual parts. It is magnificent writing.

— The New York Times review of The Sun Also Rises, 31 October 1926.

Good reviews came in from many major publications. Conrad Aiken wrote in the New York Herald Tribune, "If there is a better dialogue to be written today I do not know where to find it"; and Bruce Barton wrote in The Atlantic that Hemingway "writes as if he had never read anybody's writing, as if he had fashioned the art of writing himself," and that the characters "are amazingly real and alive."

Other critics, however, disliked the novel. The Nation's critic believed Hemingway's hard-boiled style was better suited to the short stories published in In Our Time than his novel. Writing in the New Masses, Hemingway's friend John Dos Passos asked: "What's the matter with American writing these days? ... The few unsad young men of this lost generation will have to look for another way of finding themselves than the one indicated here." Privately he wrote Hemingway an apology for the review.

The reviewer for the Chicago Daily Tribune wrote of the novel, "The Sun Also Rises is the kind of book that makes this reviewer at least almost plain angry." Some reviewers disliked the characters, among them the reviewer for The Dial, who thought the characters were shallow and vapid; and The Nation and Atheneum deemed the characters boring and the novel unimportant. The reviewer for The Cincinnati Enquirer wrote of the book that it "begins nowhere and ends in nothing."

Hemingway's family hated it. Distressed that she could not face the criticism at her local book study class, where it was said that her son was "prostituting a great ability .... to the lowest uses," his mother, Grace Hemingway, expressed her displeasure in a letter to him:

The critics seem to be full of praise for your style and ability to draw word pictures but the decent ones always regret that you should use such great gifts in perpetuating the lives and habits of so degraded a strata of humanity .... It is a doubtful honor to produce one of the filthiest books of the year .... What is the matter? Have you ceased to be interested in nobility, honor and fineness in life? .... Surely you have other words in your vocabulary than "damn" and "bitch"—Every page fills me with a sick loathing.

Still, the book sold well, and young women began to emulate Brett while male students at Ivy League universities wanted to become "Hemingway heroes." Scribner's encouraged the publicity and allowed Hemingway to "become a minor American phenomenon"—a celebrity to the point that his divorce from Richardson and marriage to Pfeiffer attracted media attention.

Reynolds believes The Sun Also Rises could have been written only circa 1925: it perfectly captured the period between World War I and the Great Depression, and immortalized a group of characters. In the years since its publication, the novel has been criticized for its antisemitism, as expressed in the characterization of Robert Cohn. Reynolds explains that although the publishers complained to Hemingway about his description of bulls, they allowed his use of Jewish epithets, which showed the degree to which antisemitism was accepted in the US after World War I. Hemingway clearly makes Cohn unlikeable not only as a character but as a character who is Jewish. Critics of the 1970s and 1980s considered Hemingway to be misogynistic and homophobic; by the 1990s his work, including The Sun Also Rises, began to receive critical reconsideration by female scholars.

== Legacy and adaptations ==
Hemingway's work continued to be popular in the latter half of the century and after his suicide in 1961. During the 1970s, The Sun Also Rises appealed to what Beegel calls the lost generation of the Vietnam era. Aldridge writes that The Sun Also Rises has kept its appeal because the novel is about being young. The characters live in the most beautiful city in the world, spend their days traveling, fishing, drinking, making love, and generally reveling in their youth. He believes the expatriate writers of the 1920s appeal for this reason, but that Hemingway was the most successful in capturing the time and the place in The Sun Also Rises.

Bloom says that some of the characters have not stood the test of time, writing that modern readers are uncomfortable with the antisemitic treatment of Cohn's character and the romanticization of a bullfighter. Moreover, Brett and Mike belong uniquely to the Jazz Age and do not translate to the modern era. Bloom believes the novel is in the canon of American literature for its formal qualities: its prose and style.

The novel made Hemingway famous, inspired young women across America to wear short hair and sweater sets like the heroine's—and to act like her too—and changed writing style in ways that could be seen in any American magazine published in the next twenty years. In many ways, the novel's stripped-down prose became a model for 20th-century American writing. Nagel writes that "The Sun Also Rises was a dramatic literary event and its effects have not diminished over the years."

The success of The Sun Also Rises led to interest from Broadway and Hollywood. In 1927, two Broadway producers wanted to adapt the story for the stage but made no immediate offers. Hemingway considered marketing the story directly to Hollywood, telling his editor Max Perkins that he would not sell it for less than $30,000—money he wanted his estranged wife Hadley Richardson to have. Conrad Aiken thought the book was perfect for a film adaptation solely on the strength of dialogue. Hemingway would not see a stage or film adaption anytime soon: he sold the film rights to RKO Pictures in 1932.

In 1956, was the novel adapted to a film of the same name. Peter Viertel wrote the screenplay. Tyrone Power as Jake played the lead role opposite Ava Gardner as Brett, and Errol Flynn as Mike. The royalties went to Richardson.

Hemingway wrote more books about bullfighting: Death in the Afternoon was published in 1932 and The Dangerous Summer was published posthumously in 1985. His depictions of Pamplona, beginning with The Sun Also Rises, helped to popularize the annual running of the bulls at the Festival of St. Fermin.

A stage adaptation, The Select (The Sun Also Rises), premiered at the Edinburgh Festival Fringe in 2010. It is named for the bar at which the protagonists gather and features a bullfight on stage.
