= Lou Burnard =

British digital humanities expert

- Louis Deryck Burnard
- Born: 9 December 1946 (age 79); Birmingham, England
- Known for: Oxford Text Archive, Text Encoding Initiative
- Partner: Lilette
- Children: 3

Academic background
- Education: Balliol College, Oxford

Lou Burnard (born 1946 in Birmingham, England) is an internationally recognised expert in digital humanities, particularly in the area of text encoding and digital libraries. He was assistant director of Oxford University Computing Services (OUCS) from 2001 to September 2010, when he officially retired from OUCS. Before that, he was manager of the Humanities Computing Unit at OUCS for five years. He has worked in ICT support for research in the humanities since the 1990s. He was one of the founding editors of the Text Encoding Initiative (TEI) and continues to play an active part in its maintenance and development, as a consultant to the TEI Technical Council and as an elected TEI board member. He has played a key role in the establishment of many other activities and initiatives in this area, such as the UK Arts and Humanities Data Service and the British National Corpus, and has published and lectured widely. Since 2008 he has worked as a Member of the Conseil Scientifique for the CNRS-funded "Adonis" TGE.

== Education and career ==
He won a scholarship to Balliol College, Oxford University, graduated with a first in English in 1968, and gained an MPhil in 19th-century English Studies (1973), MA (1979). He taught English at the University of Malawi between 1972 and 1974.

His first job at the University Computing Services was as a data centre operator. He described it as sitting in a large room in the Department of Atmospheric Physics with a line printer, a card reader, a card punch and three teletype devices. The one he sat in front of told the time every five minutes and the date every half hour. If it stopped doing either, he had instructions to call an engineer. Aside from light duties tearing up output from the line printer, that was essentially all he had to do for his 8-hour shift. He learned to program in Algol68, created a concordance to the songs of Bob Dylan, and finally got a job as a programmer in 1974.

He claimed that the first real program he wrote was 12 lines of assembler to link a PDP-8-driven graphics display to an ICL 1900 mainframe. He learned Snobol4, and worked with Susan Hockey on the design of the Oxford Concordance Program (OCP). He also worked on network database management systems, notably Cullinane's IDMS, and on ICL's CAFS text search engine.

In 1976 he set up the Oxford Text Archive with Susan Hockey.

After flirting briefly with applications of computers in History under the tutelage of Manfred Thaller, he succumbed to the lure of SGML in 1988 following the Poughkeepsie Conference, which launched the Text Encoding Initiative (TEI) project of which he has been European editor since February 1989.

The Oxford electronic Shakespeare (1989), published by the Oxford University Press, was the first to offer a commercial e-text encoded for analysis. William Montgomery, one of the editors, and Lou Burnard encoded each poem or play with COCOA tags so that it could be processed by Micro-Oxford Concordance Program.

Since October 1990 he has also been responsible for OUCS participation in the British National Corpus Project a 100- million-word corpus of modern British English.

He initiated the Xaira (XML Aware Indexing and Retrieval Architecture) project, an advanced text-searching software system for XML resources. Originally developed for searching the British National Corpus, it was funded by the Mellon Foundation in 2005–6.

== Publications ==
=== Books ===
- Burnard, Lou; Aston, Guy (1998). The BNC Handbook: Exploring the British National Corpus. Edinburgh: Edinburgh University Press. p. xiii. ISBN 0-7486-1055-3.
- Burnard, Lou (2015). What is the Text Encoding Initiative? How to add intelligent markup to digital resources. Marseille: OpenEdition Press. 114 pp. ISBN 9782821834606.

=== Papers ===
- Burnard, Lou; oxeye: a text processing package for the 1906A OUCS User Guide (1975).
- Burnard, Lou; SNOBOL: The language for literary computing, ALLC Journal, 6 (1978), 7 (1979)
- Burnard, Lou; Using Magnetic Tape OUCS User Guide (1979)
- Burnard, Lou; An application of CODASYL techniques to research in the humanities Databases in the humanities and social sciences, eds. Raben and Marks (1980)
- Burnard, Lou; OUCS User Guide (1982, 1986)
- Burnard, Lou; From archive to database Méthodes quantitatives et informatiques dans l'étude des textes, ed. Brunet (1986)
- Burnard, Lou; CAFS and text: the view from Academia ICL Technical Journal 4, (1985)
- Burnard, Lou; editor, CAFS in action Report of the ICL CUA CAFS SIG, (1985)
- Burnard, Lou; A new solution to an old problem, Literary & Linguistic Computing, 2 (1987)
- Burnard, Lou; Knowledge Base or Database? Towards a Computer Ethnology, eds. Raben, Sugita and Kubo, Senri Ethnological Studies 20 (1987)
- Burnard, Lou; Principles of Database Design, Information Technology in the Humanities, ed. Rahtz (1987)
- Burnard, Lou; Primary to Secondary History and Computing, eds. Denley and Hopkin (1987)
- Burnard, Lou; Famulus Redivivus: a case history in software development University Computing (1987)
- Burnard, Lou; Report on the Computers and Teaching in the Humanities Conference Literary & Linguistic Computing, 2 (1987)
- Burnard, Lou; HUMANIST so far ACH Newsletter, 10.1 (1988)
- Burnard, Lou; Report of Workshop on Text Encoding Guidelines, Literary & Linguistic Computing, 3 (1988)
- IZE: Software Review Computers and the Humanities vol 23 no 6, 1989
- Burnard, Lou; The Oxford Text Archive: Principles and Prospects Standardisation et Echange des bases de données historiques ed. Genet (Paris, CNRS, 1988)
- Burnard, Lou; Relational Theory and Historical Practice: the Case for SQL in History and Computing II eds.P. Denley, S. Fogelvik and C. Harvey (Manchester Univ Pr, 1989)
- Burnard, Lou; Malcolm Bain et al.; Free Text Retrieval Systems: a review and evaluation (Taylor Graham, 1989)
- The Text Encoding Initiative: a progress report Humanistiske Data 3-90, (Bergen, 1990)
- Analysing information for database design: an introduction for archaeologists Computing for Archaeologists eds. J. Moffett and S. Ross. (Oxford Committee for Archaeology, Monograph no 18, 1991)
- The Historian and the Database Historians, Computers and Data: applications in research and training ed E. Mawdsley, N. Morgan et al. (Manchester Univ Pr, 1990)
- On the intelligent handling of text retrieval Prospects for Intelligent Retrieval (Informatics 10) ed K.P. Jones (Assoc. for Information Management, 1990)
- Publishing Presenting and Archiving the Results of Research (Keynote Address), Information Technology and the Research Process eds M. Feeney and K. Merry (Bowker-Saur, 1990)
- (with C.M. Sperberg-McQueen) Guidelines for the Encoding and Interchange of machine-readable texts: draft P1 (Chicago and Oxford, ACH-ACL-ALLC Text Encoding Initiative, 1990)
- The Text Encoding Initiative: a further report in Corpus-based Computational Linguistics ed C. Souter and E. Atwell (Amsterdam, Rodopi, 1990)
- Burnard, Lou; Information Management in The Humanities Computing Yearbook 1989–90, ed I. Lancashire (OUP, 1991)
- What is SGML and how does it help? and An introduction to the Text Encoding Initiative Modelling Historical Data: towards a standard for encoding and exchanging machine-readable texts ed D. Greenstein (Göttingen, St Katherinen, 1991)
- Burnard, Lou; Tools and techniques for computer-assisted text processing in C.S. Butler Computers and Written Texts, (Blackwell, 1992)
- Burnard, Lou; The Text Encoding Initiative: a progress report New Directions in Corpus Linguistics ed G. Leitner (Berlin, de Gruyter, 1992)
- Burnard, Lou; Rolling your own with the TEI Information Services and Use vol 13 no 2 (Amsterdam, IOS Press, 1993)
- Burnard, Lou; ed S. Ross; The TEI: towards an Extensible Standard for the Encoding of Texts in Electronic Information Resources and Historians (London, British Academy, 1994)
- Burnard, Lou ed; 1994 Users Reference Guide to the British National Corpus version 1.0 (Oxford, OUCS)
- Burnard, Lou; Michael Sperberg-McQueen (1994) Guidelines for Text Encoding and Interchange (TEI P3) Chicago and Oxford, ACH-ACL-ALLC Text Encoding Initiative)
- Burnard, Lou; Short, Harold; An Arts and Humanities Data Service (Oxford, OHC, 1995)
- Burnard, Lou; What is SGML and how does it help? Computers and the Humanities 29: 41-50, 1995.
- Burnard, Lou; Rahtz, Sebastian (2004), "RelaxNG with Son of ODD", Extreme Markup Languages 2004.
- Burnard, Lou; Bauman, Syd, eds. (2007). TEI P5: Guidelines for Electronic Text Encoding and Interchange, TEI Consortium, Charlottesville, Virginia, USA.
- Burnard, Lou; Rahtz, Sebastian (June 2013). "A complete schema definition language for the Text Encoding Initiative". XML London.
