= Digital Humanities conference =

- Discipline: digital humanities

Publication details
- Publisher: ADHO
- History: 1989-
- Frequency: annual

The Digital Humanities conference is an academic conference for the field of digital humanities. It is hosted by Alliance of Digital Humanities Organizations and has been held annually since 1989.

== History ==
The first joint conference was held in 1989, at the University of Toronto—but that was the 16th annual meeting of ALLC, and the ninth annual meeting of the ACH-sponsored International Conference on Computers and the Humanities (ICCH).

The Chronicle of Higher Education has called the conference "highly competitive" but "worth the price of admission," praising its participants' focus on best practices, the intellectual community it has fostered, and the tendency of its organizers to sponsor attendance of early-career scholars (important given the relative expense of attending it, as compared to other academic conferences).

An analysis of the Digital Humanities conference abstracts between 2004 and 2014 highlights some trends evident in the evolution of the conference (such as the increasing rate of new authors entering the field, and the continuing disproportional predominance of authors from North America represented in the abstracts). An extended study (2000-2015) offer a feminist and critical engagement of Digital Humanities conferences with solutions for a more inclusive culture. Scott B. Weingart has also published detailed analyses of submissions to Digital Humanities 2013, 2014, 2015, and 2016 on his blog.

== Conferences ==
Year	Location / Organizers	Links	Observations
1990	University of Siegen, Germany	program	June 4–9
1991	Arizona State University, Tempe, Arizona, USA	program	March 17–21
1992	Oxford University, Oxford, England	program	5–9 April
1993	Georgetown University, Washington, DC, USA	program	June 16–19
1994	Sorbonne, Paris, France	program	April 19–23
1995	University of California, Santa Barbara, California, USA	program	July 11–15
1996	University of Bergen, Norway	website	June 25–29
1997	Queen's University, Kingston, Ontario, Canada	website	June 3–7
1998	Lajos Kossuth University, Debrecen, Hungary	website	July 5–10
1999	University of Virginia, Charlottesville, Virginia, USA	website	June 9–13
2000	University of Glasgow, Scotland, UK	website	July 21–25
2001	New York University, USA	website,	June 13–16
2002	University of Tübingen, Germany	website	July 23–28
2003	University of Georgia, Athens, Georgia, USA	website	May 29 - June 2
2004	University of Gothenburg, Sweden	website	June 11–16
2005	University of Victoria, British Columbia, Canada	website	June 15 - June 18
2006	Sorbonne, Paris, France	website	July 5–9
2007	University of Illinois, Urbana, Illinois, USA	website	June 2–8
2008	University of Oulu, Finland	website	June 25–29
2009	University of Maryland, College Park, Maryland, USA	website	June 20–25
2010	King's College London, UK	website	July 7–10
2011	Stanford University, California, USA	website	June 19–22
2012	University of Hamburg, Germany	website	July 16–22
2013	University of Nebraska–Lincoln, USA	website	July 16–19
2014	University of Lausanne and EPFL, Switzerland	website	July 8–12
2015	University of Western Sydney, Australia	website	June 29-July 3
2016	Jagiellonian University and Pedagogical University of Kraków, Poland	website	July 10–16
2017	McGill University and University of Montréal, Canada	website	August 1–4
2018	El Colegio de México, UNAM, Mexico (Red de Humanidades Digitales / RedHD)	website	June 24-July 1
2019	Utrecht University, Netherlands	website	July 9–12
2020	Carleton University and University of Ottawa, Canada	website	July 22–24
2021	Local virtual conferences	website	
2022	The University of Tokyo, Japan (online)	website	July 25-29
2023	University of Graz, Austria	website	July 10-14
2024	George Mason University, Washington DC, USA	website	August 6-9
2025	New University of Lisbon, Portugal	website	July 14-18
2026	Daejeon Convention Center, South Korea (KADH)		
