= Eighteenth Century Collections Online =

Digital collection of published works

Eighteenth Century Collections Online (ECCO) is a digital collection of books published in Great Britain during the 18th century.

Gale, an education publishing company in the United States, assembled the collection by digitally scanning microfilm reproductions of 136,291 titles. Documents scanned after 2002 are added to a second collection, ECCO II. As of January 2014, ECCO II comprises 46,607 titles.

== Conversions and access ==
So far 2,231 texts have been released free to the public through the work of the University of Michigan’s Text Creation Partnership. Rather than OCR, they rekey the texts and tag them with TEI. Their aim is to enable improved access to a fraction of the collection: they are making SGML/XML text editions for 10,000 books. In addition to the free version, subscription access is also offered.

Text analytic tools are available on this subset through the Text Analysis Portal for Research project.

One of the "Text Creation Partners", the University of Oxford, has converted the public domain texts into free, publicly accessible versions, in accordance with the Text Encoding Initiative P5 guidelines, and makes them available in a variety of file formats, including HTML and EPUB via the Oxford Text Archive.

Cross-search is also available from ProQuest for those who subscribe to both Early English Books Online and ECCO.

== Reviews ==
- Choice, April 2010
- Library Journal, November 15, 2008
- NetConnect, Spring 2008
- Information World, February 2005
- Reference Reviews, August 2004
- Database and Disc Reviews, May 2004
- ARBA, 2004

== See also ==
- American Society for Eighteenth-Century Studies
- Book scanning
- British Society for Eighteenth-Century Studies
- Burney Collection
- English Short-Title Catalogue
- Books in the United Kingdom
