= Susan Hockey =

British computer scientist

- Born: 1946 (age 79–80); Halifax, Yorkshire, England
- Occupations: Emeritus Professor of Library and Information Studies
- Known for: ALLC, ACH, TEI

Susan Hockey (born 1946) is an English computer scientist. She is emeritus Professor of Library and Information Studies at University College London. She has written about the history of digital humanities, the development of text analysis applications, electronic textual mark-up, teaching computing in the humanities, and the role of libraries in managing digital resources. In 2014, University College London created a Digital Humanities lecture series in her honour.

== Early life ==
Hockey was born Susan Petty in 1946 in Halifax, West Yorkshire, and educated at Princess Mary High School, Halifax and Lady Margaret Hall, Oxford.

== Career ==
In 1969 she joined the Atlas Computer Laboratory at Chilton in Oxfordshire. She became a founding member of the Association for Literary and Linguistic Computing (ALLC) in 1973 and in 1975 she joined Oxford University Computing Services. At Atlas she developed software for the display of non-Western characters. At Oxford she was instrumental in developing the Oxford Concordance Program from COCOA, an early piece of software used in humanities computing. These tools have become central to the practice of the digital humanities in the United States and UK.

From 1991 to 1997 Hockey was director of the Center for Electronic Texts in the Humanities at Rutgers and Princeton Universities in New Jersey. From 1997 to 1999 she was Professor and Director of the Canadian Institute for Research Computing in Arts at the University of Alberta in Edmonton. In 2000 she joined University College London as Professor of Library and Information Studies, and from 2001 was Director of the School of Library, Archive and Information Studies at UCL. She retired in 2004.

In 2004, Hockey was awarded the Alliance of Digital Humanities Organizations's Roberto Busa Prize in recognition of "outstanding lifetime achievements in the application of information and communications technologies to humanities research". She also talked about her career path in the Digital Humanities though the 1960s and 1970s in an interview with Julianne Nyhan.

She is a founding member of several major digital humanities-related associations such as the Association for Literary and Linguistic Computing (ALLC), 1973, and the Association for Computers and the Humanities (ACH), 1978, and an editor of the Association for Literary and Linguistic Computing (ALLC) Bulletin, 1979–83, chair of the Association for Literary and Linguistic Computing (ALLC), 1984–97 and member of the steering committee of the Text Encoding Initiative (TEI), 1987–99.

== Publications ==
- A Guide to Computer Applications in the Humanities. Duckworth. 1980. ISBN 978-0715613153.
- SNOBOL Programming for the Humanities. Oxford University Press. 1986. ISBN 978-0198246756.
- Electronic Texts in the Humanities: Principles and Practice. Oxford University Press. 2000. ISBN 978-0198711940.
