= Sebastian Rahtz =

British digital humanities information professional

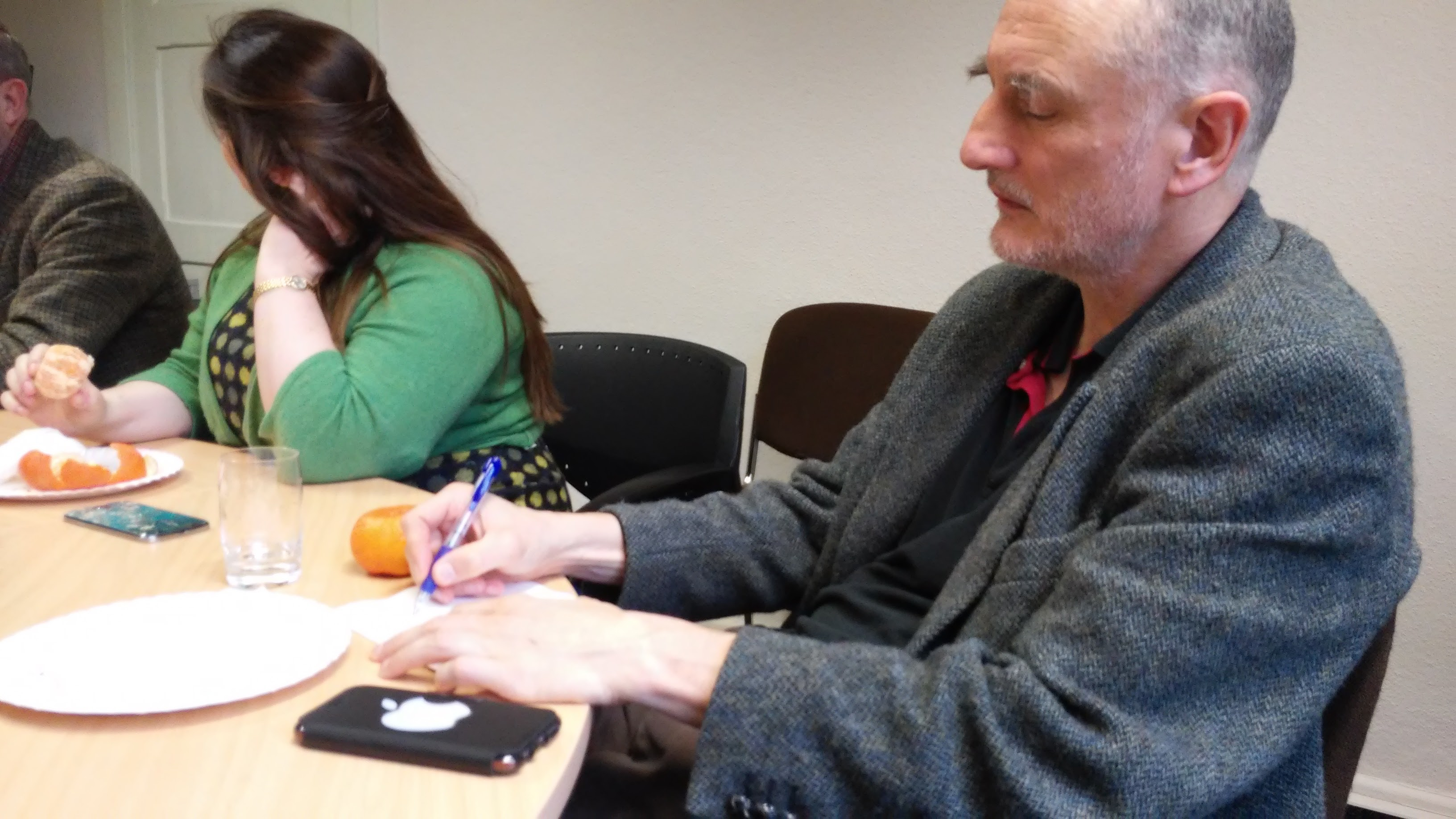
- Sebastian Rahtz in 2015
- Born: Sebastian Patrick Quintus Rahtz; 13 February 1955; Bristol, England
- Died: 15 March 2016 (aged 61); Oxford, England
- Resting place: Oxford, England
- Other name: SPQR
- Education: University College London (PhD)
- Known for: TeX; Text Encoding Initiative
- Spouse: Leonor Barroca
- Children: 2
- Scientific career
- Workplaces: University of Exeter; University of Southampton; University of Oxford; Oxford University Computing Services
- Thesis: Funerary epitaphs and iconography : an analysis of the Protestant Cemetery, Rome (1974)

Sebastian Patrick Quintus Rahtz (13 February 1955 – 15 March 2016) (SPQR) was a British digital humanities information professional.

== Education and early life ==
Born in 1955 to archaeologist Philip Rahtz, Sebastian also trained in archaeology, and was awarded a PhD in 1974 from University College London.

== Career ==
Rahtz developed an interest in computing from working on the Lexicon of Greek Personal Names (LGPN) in 1982.

Rahtz was a long-term contributor to several communities in the broader digital humanities, including LGPN, TeX, computer methods in archaeology, and the Text Encoding Initiative (TEI). Rahtz' legacy also includes the vital contributions which he made to building and maintaining much of the TEI's technical Infrastructure and related software such as their XSLT stylesheets and web-based document conversion engine OxGarage, CLAROS, the Oxford Text Archive, Text Creation Partnership and OSS Watch.

From 1999 to 2015 he worked at Oxford University Computing Services (OUCS) which in August 2012 merged with two other departments to become IT Services. He joined the department in 1999 from Elsevier, having previously served as a lecturer in Humanities Computing at the University of Southampton. He became Head of the Information and Support Group in OUCS, and then joint Director (for Research) of the Academic IT Group in 2010, and a member of the senior management team. In 2014, he was appointed Chief Data Architect. He took medical retirement from IT Services in the late summer of 2015.

=== Publications ===
- Kicking and screaming: Challenges and advantages of bringing TCP texts into line with Text Encoding Initiative. J. Cummings and S. Rahtz, in Bodleian Libraries, University of Oxford, "Revolutionizing Early Modern Studies"? The Early English Books Online Text Creation Partnership, (2012). Retrieved from http://ora.ox.ac.uk/objects/uuid:f9667884-220b-4ec9-bb2f-c79044302399
- The LaTeX Web Companion: Integrating TeX, HTML, and XML. M. Goossens, S. P. Q. Rahtz, and S. Rahtz, with E. Gurari, R. Moore, and R. Sutor. Addison-Wesley
- Guide to LaTeX. H. Kopka, P. W. Daly, and S. P. Q. Rahtz. Addison-Wesley
- The LaTeX companion. F. Mittelbach, M. Goossens, J. Braams, D. Carlisle, and C. Rowley. Addison-Wesley
- LaTeX: Einführung. H. Kopka and S. Rahtz. Addison-Wesley
- The LaTeX Graphics Companion: Illustrating Documents with TeX and Postscript (Tools and Techniques for Computer Typesetting). M. Goossens, F. Mittelbach, S. Rahtz. D. Roegel, and H. Voss. Addison-Wesley
- A style option for rotated objects in LaTeX (1992), 156-180. S. Rahtz and L. Barroca.
- Archaeology and the Information Age: A global perspective (1992), P. Reilly and S. Rahtz (eds.), One World Archaeology. Routledge.

=== Legacy ===
In September 2016, Oxford University ran a whole-day event celebrating his life, with speakers talking about his projects. Many of the talks are available as podcasts.

== Personal life ==
He died in 2016, from brain cancer.
