= Surendra Jha 'Suman' =

Indian politician (1910–2002)

- Born: 10 October 1910; Ballipur village, Samastipur District, Bihar, India
- Died: 5 March 2002 (aged 91); Darbhanga district, Bihar
- Occupations: Poet, Freedom Fighter, Member of Parliament, Member of Legislative Assembly, essayist, Literary critic, journalist, publisher, Academician
- Spouse: Ganga Devi
- Children: Brajendra Jha, Two Daughters
- Writing career
- Pen name: Suman ji
- Notable awards: 1971:Sahitya Akademi Award; 1995: Sahitya Akademi Translation Prize; 1981: Vidyapati Puraskar

Surendra Jha 'Suman' (10 October 1910 – 5 March 2002), also referred to as 'Suman Ji' or Acharya Surendra Jha 'Suman', was a Maithili poet, writer, publisher, editor and elected member of legislative assembly and parliament. He is also known for his role as publisher, editor, journalist, social and cultural reformer and promoter of Mithila culture. He authored about forty books in Maithili and was also the editor of various publications and books in Maithili, Sanskrit and Hindi. He served the Governing Bodies of various literary and academic institutions in different capacities in his State. He was also the recipient of Sahitya Akademy Award in 1971 for Payaswini and in 1995 for Translation Rabindra Natakavali Vol. I.

== Early life and family ==
Surendra Jha 'Suman' was born on 10 October 1910 in Ballipur Village of District Samastipur, Bihar. His father Bhubaneswar Jha was a well known Ayurvedic practitioner. Traditionally the family belonged to Sanskrit scholars. He was educated at Dharmaraj Sanskrit College, Muzaffarpur and was a graduate in literature (Sahityacharya) and was also a Kavyatirtha (Bengal). He was married to Ganga Devi a native of Begusarai at the age of 25 years. He has one son Brajendra Jha, and two daughters. He retired as a professor and HOD, Maithili Language in LNMU University Darbhanga, Bihar. He was elected a member of parliament from Darbhanga Lok Sabha Constituency on Janata Party ticket for the 6th Lok Sabha.

== Work and contributions ==
As a writer, both in the realm of prose and poetry, He had a superb command over several languages and this qualification brought him a reward from the then President of India, Dr. Rajendra Prasad. Besides the Sahitya Akademi award, in 1981 Maithili Akademi, Patna Awarded him Vidyapati Puraskar.

He was the Maithili representative in Sahitya Akademi and a member of its Maithili advisory board. He was president of All India Maithili Sahitya Parishad. He was associated with Vaidehi Samiti Darbhanga also.

He occupies a very prominent place in the modern Maithili literature. His choice of words, alliterations, metaphor and similes, use of prosody and description of seasons, have been unique in modern Maithili literature.

His Payasvini (1969), a collection of 25 poems about beauty of nature, colourful imagery and simplicity of rural life has won for him the Sahitya Akademi award for 1971. In this one can find metrical experiment to metaphor.

Payasvini is based on the idea of comparing poetry with a milch cow, as described in the Prithvisukta of Atharvaved and Brihadaranyakopnishad, where Vakdhenu has been described in Vth chapter VIIIth Brahman.

Here Pavas (Rainy Season) is as good asTamasi, Mrityunjaya and milch cow and the river has been compared with rasvanti (charming succulent woman), vanita (woman) and kavita (poetry). The mountain has been compared with an old man, a youth and a child. Sumanji's poetry Dattavati (1962) describes the Sino-Indian War and contains patriotic fervour as in Bharat vandana (1970) and Antarnad (1970).

His Uttara (1980) is a Khandakavya (miniepic) the story has been taken from the Mahabharat it doesn't focuses the compactness of the character of Uttara only. In fact his style and verve of poetry is loaded with Sanskrit words, simile, Alankar and imagery of old Sanskrit poetry hence at times not relished by modern readers, not much acquainted with Sanskrit prosody. His publications include Pratipada (1948). The very name suggests the new start, a new direction in Maithili poetry. Its introduction and dedication is also in poems. All the other 16 poems were composed before India achieved independence. It expresses suffocation felt by the poet under foreign rule. Similarly Kavitak Ahvan shows poetic inspiration and patriotic fervour. Samsan shows philosophical reflection on the cremation ground. The favourite topics of Sanskrit poets are treated with new imagery in Asadhasya pratham divase, Yamuna, Asuryampasya and Sharad. Similarly, the poet exalts the feelings of 'Haldhar' (ploughman) of today, higher than Balaram and Janaka of the Yore days of Dvapara Yuga and Treta Yuga.

His 'Ode to Tree' can favourably be compared with anyone of the best lyrics of any literature. Here he compares and admires the services, dedication and sacrifices of 'Tree' to mankind and associates them with those of an ascetic. Yugnirman visualises the future and Uktipratyukti reaches out to the heart of the down trodden. All these poems have since been collected in his anthologies of poems 'Pratipada'which is a landmark in modern Maithili.

His other poetry collections include Saon-Bhado (1965), Archana (1961), Kathayuthika (1976) and others. Lalana Lahari (1969) offers a description of the characteristics of love associated with women from different provinces of India Gangavtaran (1967) includes a poem in praise of Ganga. His work covers a wide range of topics and is written in classical style.

His excellent poetic qualities can be seen in the following lines:

The jungles on all sides are thick with the smell of Bakul flower;
the Ketaki flower has filled the wind and made it dense.
In every home the she-peacock is dancing;
Everybody's eyes feast upon the dark clouds (meaning also Lord Krishna),
but it is in my home alone where the flame of love remains unquenched.

This is the young lady of Alaka agonised on account of unrequited love. (A Survey of Maithili Literature-R.K.Choudhary Pp. 199)

As a translator into Maithili he has chosen both poetry and prose. Mainly he translated from Bengali and Sanskrit. His translations from Bengali are:

- Sarat Chandra's Baradidi (Barakidai)
- Rabindranath Tagore's Gitanjali (1969)
- and Rabindra Nibandhabali(1994)

From Sanskrit

- Puruspariksha of Vidyapati
- Vedic hymns (Richalok, 1970)
- Sankaracharya's Anand Lahari (1969)
- and Saundarya Lahari (1972)
- Durgasaptasati (Chandicharya, 1950)
- Shivamahimna Strotra (1969)
- Kalidas's Raghuvamsa (1970) and Ritusamhar
- Sringar Tilak (1969)
- Hitopdesika
- PutroahamPrithvyah (1964)
- Shaktistavak (1969)
- Harismaranika (1970)
- Prachetas Rajashastram (1993)

=== Fiction writing ===
Surendra Jha 'Suman' also ventured into fiction writing. In fact one of his short stories 'Brihaspatik Shes' (The inauspicious afternoon of Thursday) has been quite popular. He published his first anthology of short stories Kathamukhi. His novel 'Uganak Diyadvad ' deals with the Khavas (bonded labour) system of feudalistic society and the changes occurring in society in the light of modernity.

=== Mithila Press ===
His contribution as a journalist, editor and publisher is remarkable which started with setting up of Mithila Press in 1948, dedicated to his quest of spreading awareness of Maithili language, culture and literature. It is still functioning under his son as Mithila Press Publications. He edited erstwhile edition of the Mithila Mihir (Old edition).

His calibre as an editor can be seen in the Mithilank of Mithila Mihir published in 1935.He has also edited: – Swadesh first a monthly and then a daily. He has the credit to bring out first daily in Maithil, for which he suffered a heavy loss, spent his provident fund and devoted time and labour to publish this daily newspaper.

He successfully edited Prachi, a periodical published by Sahitya Akademi, regional office, Kolkata. It consisted of English translation of literature published in eastern India, namely, Assamese, Bengali, Maithili, Meitei, Nepali and Oriya.

He was the editor of a popular monthly magazine named Vaidehi first a fortnightly and later on published monthly.

He compiled Maithili Prachin Geet (1977) a research work with Dr. Ramdev Jha.His other research work includes, a critical study:-

- Maithili Kavya Par Sanskritak Prabhav (Impact of Sanskrit on Maithili poetry (1977))

=== Other publications and work ===
- Lal Das's Ramayana and Chanda Jha's Ramayana.
- Biographies of Maithili writer Kumar Ganganand Singh(1991) and Mahakavi Raghunandan Das(1996)
- Brought out Jyotiriswar's Varnaratnakar.
- Edited Anand Vijaya (1971) by Ramdas Jha, And Umapati Upadhyay's Parijat Haran (1965), dramas of medieval period and Manbodha's Krishnajanma (1970), a Khanda kavya.
- Compiled and edited an anthology of one act play, Ekanki Sangrah (1970) with Manipadma and Sudhansu Sekhar Choudhary.

=== Political career ===
Surendra Jha 'Suman' was a Member of Sixth Lok Sabha from 1977 to 1979 representing Darbhanga Parliamentary Constituency of Bihar.

An able Parliamentarian, Suman was a Member of the Committee on Official Language during 1977–78 and the Committee on Absence of Members from the Sittings of the House during 1978.

Earlier, Surendra Jha 'Suman' was a Member of Bihar Legislative Assembly from 1972 to 1975. He was also a Member of Darbhanga Municipality for ten years.

== Death ==
He died on 5 March 2002 in Darbhanga at the age of 92 years due to heart-related problem. Acharya Suman Chowk has been established near Harahi Lake in his memorial in Darbhanga and named after him.

== See also ==
- List of people from Darbhanga
