= Lucy Atkins =

British author and journalist

- Born: 1968 (age 57–58); Edinburgh, Scotland
- Education: Corpus Christi College, Oxford
- Occupation: Writer
- Notable work: Magpie Lane; Windmill Hill; The Night Visitor; First Time Parent; The Cancer Survivor's Companion
- Children: 3
- Parent(s): B. T. S. Atkins, Peter Atkins
- Website: lucyatkins.com

Lucy Atkins is a British author and journalist. Her novels include Magpie Lane, Windmill Hill and The Night Visitor. Her books have been published in the UK and internationally and The Night Visitor (2017) has been optioned for television.

== Personal life ==
Atkins is the daughter of the lexicographer B. T. S. Atkins and the niece of linguist John McHardy Sinclair. She teaches on the Creative Writing master's degree at the University of Oxford.

== Career ==
She is a literary critic for The Sunday Times and The Guardian and served as a judge for the 2017 Costa Book Awards She has co-presented features about books on BBC Radio Oxford. She has also written for UK other newspapers and magazines, including The Guardian, The Times, The Sunday Times and The Telegraph.

== Selected publications ==
=== Fiction ===
- Windmill Hill. 2023.
- Magpie Lane. 2020.
- The Night Visitor. 2017.
- The Other Child. 2015.
- The Missing One. 2014.

=== Non-fiction ===
- Lucy Atkins. 2010. First-Time Parent: The honest guide to coping brilliantly and staying sane in your baby’s first year. HarperCollins.
- Lucy Atkins and Frances Goodhart. 2011. The Cancer Survivor's Companion: Practical ways to cope with your feelings after cancer. 2011 Hachette UK.
- Frances Goodhart and Lucy Atkins. 2013. How to Feel Better: Practical ways to recover well from illness and injury.
- Lucy Atkins and Julia Guderian. 2005. Blooming Birth. How to Get the Pregnancy and Birth You Want.
