= Association for Computers and the Humanities =

International professional society for digital humanities

The Association for Computers and the Humanities (ACH) is the primary international professional society for digital humanities. ACH was founded in 1978. According to the official website, the organization "support[s] and disseminate[s] research and cultivate[s] a vibrant professional community through conferences, publications, and outreach activities." ACH is based in the United States, and has an international membership. ACH is a founding member of the Alliance of Digital Humanities Organizations (ADHO), a co-originator of the Text Encoding Initiative, and a co-sponsor of an annual conference.

== Conference ==
ACH has been a co-sponsor of the annual Digital Humanities conference (formerly ACH/ALLC, before that International Conference on Computing in the Humanities or ICCH) since 1989. From 2006, when ADHO was founded, the larger umbrella organization is the conference's official sponsor.

== Journals ==
- Until 2004, Computers and the Humanities was the official journal of ACH. (In 2005 it was renamed to Language Resources and Evaluation.
- The print journal most closely associated with ACH is Literary and Linguistic Computing (Oxford University Press).
- The open-access, peer-reviewed journal of ACH is Digital Humanities Quarterly (ADHO).

== Associated Organizations ==
ACH is joined in ADHO by:

- Association for Literary and Linguistic Computing (ALLC)
- Canadian Society for Digital Humanities/Société canadienne des humanités numériques (CSDH-SCHN)

Other related Organizations:

- Association for Computational Linguistics
- Text Encoding Initiative
