= Scott B. Weingart =

Historian of science

- Occupations: Scholar, administrator
- Title: Chief Data Officer, National Endowment for the Humanities
- Awards: Paul Fortier Prize in Digital Humanities (2011)

Academic background
- Education: Indiana University Bloomington

Academic work
- Discipline: History of Science; Digital Humanities
- Institutions: National Endowment for the Humanities; University of Notre Dame; Carnegie Mellon University
- Notable works: The Network Turn (2020); The Historian's Macroscope: Exploring Big Historical Data (2022)
- Website: http://scottbot.net

Scott B. Weingart is an American scholar and director of the Office of Data and Evaluation at the National Endowment for the Humanities, a position he has held since 2023.

== Academic career ==
Weingart graduated from the University of Florida in 2009 with a Bachelor's degree in the history of science and a minor in computer engineering. He then worked as a research assistant at the Cyberinfrastructure for Network Science Center at Indiana University until 2015, when he became director of the digital humanities program at Carnegie Mellon University (2015–2021) and the digital scholarship program at the University of Notre Dame (2021–2022). Weingart also held elected positions in the Association for Computers and the Humanities and the Alliance of Digital Humanities Organizations.

In December 2020, Cambridge University Press published The Network Turn: Changing Perspectives in the Humanities, a book Weingart co-authored that shows how arts and humanities scholars have approached network visualization, social network theory, and quantitative methods drawn from network science. The book is in about 400 academic libraries and was the subject of two special journal issues.

In 2015 he co-authored the textbook The Historian's Macroscope: Exploring Big Historical Data, published by World Scientific Press, with a second edition released in 2022.

In 2023 he became the founding director of the Office of Data and Evaluation at the U.S. National Endowment for the Humanities.

=== Recognition ===
In 2011, the Alliance of Digital Humanities Organizations awarded Weingart and his co-author Jeana Jorgensen the Paul Fortier Prize in Digital Humanities for their work on gender and the body in European fairy tales. For the Latin American Comics Archive, Humanidades Digitales Hispánicas awarded Weingart and his colleagues Felipe Gómez, Daniel Evans, and Rikk Mulligan the 'Mejor iniciativa formativa' (best formative initiative) award in 2018.

== Selected publications ==
- Ahnert, Ruth; Ahnert, Sebastian E.; Coleman, Catherine Nicole; Weingart, Scott (2020). The Network Turn: Changing Perspectives in the Humanities. Canbridge, United Kingdom: Cambridge University Press. ISBN 9781108866804. OCLC 1231561650.
- Graham, Shawn; Milligan, Ian; Weingart, Scott; Martin, Kimberly (2022). The Historian's Macroscope: Exploring Big Historical Data. New Jersey: World Scientific Press. ISBN 978-9811243035. OCLC 1269422323.
