= CLOC =

First generation general purpose text analyzer

CLOC (an acronym derived from CoLOCation) was a first generation general purpose text analyzer program. It was produced at the University of Birmingham and could produce concordances as well as word lists and collocational analysis of text. First-generation concordancers were typically held on a mainframe computer and used at a single site; individual research teams would build their own concordancer and use it on the data they had access to locally, any further analysis was done by separate programs.

== History ==
CLOC was written by Alan Reed in Algol 68-R which was available only on the ICT 1900 series of computer at that time. Perhaps because it was designed for use in a department of linguistics rather than by computer specialists it had the distinction of having a comparatively simple user interface, it also has some useful features for studying collations or the co-occurrence of words.

CLOC was used in the COBUILD project that was headed by Professor John Sinclair.
