= COCOA (digital humanities) =

Text file utility and file format

COCOA (an acronym derived from "count and concordance generation on Atlas") was an early text file utility and associated file format for digital humanities, then known as humanities computing. It was approximately 4000 punched cards of FORTRAN and created in the late 1960s and early 1970s at University College London and the Atlas Computer Laboratory in Harwell, Oxfordshire. Functionality included word-counting and concordance building.

== Oxford Concordance Program ==
The Oxford Concordance Program format was a direct descendant of COCOA developed at Oxford University Computing Services. The Oxford Text Archive holds items in this format.

== Later developments ==
The COCOA file format bears at least a passing similarity to the later markup languages such as SGML and XML. A noticeable difference with its successors is that COCOA tags are flat and not tree structured. In that format, every information type and value encoded by a tag should be considered true until the same tag changes its value. Members of the Text Encoding Initiative community maintain legacy support for COCOA, although most in-demand texts and corpora have already been migrated to more widely understood formats such as TEI XML.
