= Oxford Text Archive =

Oxford Text Archive (OTA) is an archive of electronic texts and other literary and language resources at the University of Oxford, England which have been created, collected and distributed for the purpose of research into literary and linguistic topics.

The OTA collection consists of deposits of primary-source academic electronic editions and linguistic corpora created by the academic community. The OTA was one of founding centres in the European research infrastructure (CLARIN, the Common Language Resources and Technology Infrastructure). The OTA collection contains many scholarly documents marked up according to the guidelines of the Text Encoding Initiative, including copies of all of the Eighteenth Century Collections Online (ECCO) and Early English Books Online (EEBO) texts which are now in the public domain, linked data. The OTA also manages the distribution of the British National Corpus (BNC).

== History ==
The OTA was founded by Lou Burnard and Susan Hockey of Oxford University Computing Services (OUCS) in 1976, initially as the Oxford Archive of Electronic Literature. It is thought to be one of the first archives of digital academic textual resources to collect and distribute materials from other research centres.

From 1996 to 2008, the OTA was one of the centres of the Arts and Humanities Data Service, and hosted AHDS Literature, Languages and Linguistics, a national centre for the support of digital research in literary and linguistic subject areas in the UK.

The OTA continued to be hosted by OUCS (which became subsumed into IT Services in 2012), and in November 2016, the OTA collections found a new home in the Bodleian Library. In November 2021, the Bodleian Libraries posted an announcement stating that further deposits were no longer being accepted until further notice, and from the summer of 2026, the Bodleian Libraries version of the site was no longer available.. From 2022, the OTA collections have been available from the Literary and Linguistic Data Service repository, which continues to develop the collections with new acquisitions, and is part of the national and European research infrastructure, as a CLARIN centre and a trusted repository in the AHRC-funded Infrastructure for Digital Arts and Humanities Programme (iDAH). There are more than 70,000 items in the collections, as of March 2025.
