= George Thomason (book collector) =

George Thomason (died April 1666) was an English book collector. He is famous for assembling a collection of more than 22,000 books and pamphlets published during the time of the English Civil War and the interregnum.

Thomason's collection was formerly known as the "King's Pamphlets" after King George III, but is now called the Thomason Collection of Civil War Tracts.

== Biography ==
During the years just before the outbreak of war a great number of writings covering every phase of the questions in dispute between king and people were issued, and in 1641 Thomason began to collect these. Working diligently at his task for about twenty years, he possessed nearly 23,000 separate publications in 1662, and having arranged these in chronological order he had them bound in 1,983 volumes. Thomason was concerned in Christopher Love's plot in 1651.

After many vicissitudes the collection was bought in 1761 from his descendants by George III, who presented it to the British Museum. In 1973, the museum transferred the Thomason Collection to the British Library.
