= Alliance of Digital Humanities Organizations =

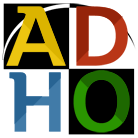
- Formation: 2005
- Website: adho.org

The Alliance of Digital Humanities Organizations (ADHO) is a digital humanities umbrella organization formed in 2005 to coordinate the activities of several regional DH organizations, referred to as constituent organizations.

== Members ==
ADHO's constituent organizations are:

- the Association for Computers and the Humanities (ACH),
- the Australasian Association for Digital Humanities (aaDH),
- the Canadian Society for Digital Humanities/Société canadienne des humanités numériques (CSDH/SCHN),
- centerNet,
- the Digital Humanities Alliance for research and teaching innovations (DHARTI) from India
- the Digital Humanities Association of Southern Africa (DHASA)
- the Association for Digital Humanities in the German Speaking Areas (DHd)
- the European Association for Digital Humanities (EADH),
- Humanistica, the french-speaking association for Digital Humanities,
- the Japanese Association for Digital Humanities (JADH),
- the Korean Association for Digital Humanities (한국디지털인문학협의회, KADH),
- Red de Humanidades Digitales
- and the Taiwanese Association for Digital Humanities (TADH)

== History ==
The effort to establish the alliance began in Tübingen, Germany, at the ALLC/ACH conference in 2002: a steering committee was appointed at the ALLC/ACH meeting in 2004, in Gothenburg, Sweden, and the executive committees of the ACH and Association for Literary and Linguistic Computing (ALLC) approved the governance and conference protocols at the 2005 meeting in Victoria, Canada. The Association for Computers and the Humanities was also included. In 2007, the Alliance Steering Committee voted to enfranchise The Society for Digital Humanities / Société pour l'étude des médias interactifs (SDH/SEMI) of Canada. In 2012, centerNet, a network of digital humanities centers, became a "constituent organization" affiliated with ADHO, followed by the Japanese Association for Digital Humanities in 2013, the French-speaking Association for Digital Humanities, Humanistica, in 2016, and the Taiwanese Association for Digital Humanities in 2017. ADHO gained legal status as the Stichting ADHO Foundation (Netherlands) in 2013.

=== Mission ===
The Alliance of Digital Humanities Organizations is an umbrella organisation whose goals are to promote and support digital research and teaching across arts and humanities disciplines, drawing together humanists engaged in digital and computer-assisted research, teaching, creation, dissemination, and beyond, in all areas reflected by its diverse membership. ADHO supports initiatives for publication, presentation, collaboration, and training; recognises and supports excellence in these endeavours; and acts as a community-based consultative and advisory force. Members in ADHO societies are those at the forefront of areas such as textual analysis, electronic publication, document encoding, textual studies and theory, new media studies and multimedia, digital libraries, applied augmented reality, interactive gaming, and beyond. Members include researchers and lecturers in humanities computing and in academic departments such as English, History, French, Modern Languages, Philosophy, Theatre, Music, Computer Science, and Visual Arts and resource specialists working in libraries, archival centers, and with humanities computing groups.

=== Conference ===
The Alliance oversees a joint annual conference, which began as the ACH/ALLC (or ALLC/ACH) conference, and is now known as the Digital Humanities conference.

=== Special Interest Groups (SIGs) ===
The Alliance of Digital Humanities Organizations sponsors special interest groups to facilitate the sharing of ideas about new and innovative problems. Current SIGs include:

- AVinDH for Audiovisual materials and their use in the digital humanities
- GO::DH, or Global Outlook :: Digital Humanities, to increase global communication and collaboration
- GeoHumanities to focus on spatial perspectives, which can also be linked temporally
- Libraries and Digital Humanities
- Linked Open Data to connect DH scholars and the semantic web community

=== Peer-reviewed journals ===
- DSH: Digital Scholarship in the Humanities, (formerly Literary and Linguistic Computing) a print journal published by Oxford University Press.
- Digital Studies / Le champ numérique, an open-access, peer-reviewed electronic journal from CSDH/SCHN founded in 2008.
- Digital Humanities Quarterly, an open-access, peer-reviewed electronic journal from the ADHO.
- DH Commons, an open access, peer-reviewed electronic journal from centerNet.
- Humanités numériques, an open-access, peer-reviewed electronic journal from Humanistica.
- Journal of the Text Encoding Initiative, the official journal of the TEI Consortium.
- Journal of Digital Archives and Digital Humanities, an open access, peer-reviewed electronic journal from TADH.

Discontinued Journals:

- Computers in the Humanities Working Papers, an online preprint publication hosted at the University of Toronto published from 1990 to 2009.
- Text Technology, a free electronic journal published by McMaster University published from 2004 through 2007

=== Awards ===
Roberto Busa Prize honors leaders in the field of humanities computing and is given in honor of Italian Father Roberto Busa who won the first award in 1998 at Debrecen, Hungary.

Subsequent winners included:

- John Burrows (Australia) (presented in 2001, New York, New York, USA)
- Susan Hockey (UK) (presented in 2004, Gothenburg, Sweden)
- Wilhelm Ott (Germany) (2007, Champaign-Urbana, Illinois, USA)
- Joseph Raben (USA) (2010, King's College London, UK)
- Willard McCarty (Canada) (2013, University of Nebraska–Lincoln, USA)
- Helen Agüera (USA) (2016, Kraków, Poland)
- Susan Irene Brown (Canada) (2024, Arlington, Virginia, USA)

Antonio Zampolli Prize is awarded every three years to an important project or for a major accomplishment.

Paul Fortier Prize is given to the best young scholar paper at the annual Digital Humanities conference.

Lisa Lena Opas-Hanninen Young Scholar Prize recognizes a young scholar for their scholarship or contribution using digital technology at a humanities conference.
