= Semantic prosody =

Term used in linguistics

Semantic prosody, also discourse prosody, describes the way in which certain seemingly neutral words can be perceived with positive or negative associations through frequent occurrences with particular collocations. Coined in analogy to linguistic prosody, popularised by Bill Louw.

An example given by John Sinclair is the verb set in, which has a negative prosody: e.g. rot (with negative associations) is a prime example of what is going to 'set in'. Another well-known example is the verb sense of cause, which is also used mostly in a negative context (accident, catastrophe, etc.), though one can also say that something "caused happiness".

Semantic prosody, like semantic preference, can be genre- or register-dependent. For example, erupted has a positive prosody in sports reporting but a negative prosody in hard news reporting.

In recent years, linguists have used corpus linguistics and concordancing software to find such hidden associations. Specialised software is used to arrange key words in context from a corpus of several million words of naturally occurring text. The collocates can then be arranged alphabetically according to first or second word to the right or to the left. Using such a method, Elena Tognini-Bonelli (2001) found that the word largely occurred more frequently with negative words or expressions, while broadly appeared more frequently with positive ones. Lexicographers have often failed to account for semantic prosody when defining a word, although with the recent development and increasing use of computers, the field of corpus linguistics is now being combined with that of lexicography.

Semantic prosodies can be examined cross-linguistically, by contrasting the semantic prosody of near synonyms in different languages such as English and Chinese.

== Effects ==
If a word with a strong negative semantic prosody (e.g. onslaught) co-occurs with a positive word (e.g. hospitality) instead of an expected negative word (e.g. an onslaught of hospitality), a range of effects are possible as a result of such a collocational clash:

- irony,
- expression of a subtle hidden meaning, often negative evaluation,
- poetic or humorous use.

== Debates ==
There are debates about whether the regular co-occurrence of a particular word with positive/negative words results in that word acquiring a positive or negative connotation. Clear counter-examples include words with positive connotations that regularly co-occur with negative words, for example ease, soothe, tackle. In such cases, the words that follow such verbs are probably perceived as negative, but not the verbs themselves.

Another debate concerns whether the term semantic/discourse prosody only relates to positive/negative meaning (narrow definition) or to more complex attitudinal/functional meaning. According to John Sinclair, semantic prosody "expresses something close to the ‘function’ of the item – it shows how the rest of the item is to be interpreted functionally”. However, the narrow definition is much more widely used in corpus linguistics.

== See also ==
- Coherence (linguistics)
- Discourse analysis
- Corpus linguistics
