= Beryl Atkins =

British lexicographer (1931–2021)

Beryl T. (Sue) Atkins
- Born: Beryl Sinclair; 23 January 1931
- Died: 3 September 2021 (aged 90)
- Education: Edinburgh University
- Occupation: Lexicographer
- Known for: Creation of bilingual dictionaries from corpus data
- Notable work: Collins-Robert English/French Dictionaries: Standard edition, Oxford-Hachette English/French Dictionary, Dictionary of English Phrasal Verbs
- Spouse: Peter Atkins
- Children: Paul, Jenny, Lucy
- Family: John McHardy Sinclair (brother)

Beryl T. "Sue" Atkins (née Sinclair; 23 January 1931 — 3 September 2021) was a British lexicographer, specialising in computational lexicography, who pioneered the creation of bilingual dictionaries from corpus data.

== Biography ==
External videos
- Sue Atkins Lexicographer, 2020, YouTube video

Sue Atkins had been a professional lexicographer since 1966, first with Collins Publishers (now HarperCollins), where she was General Editor of the first 'modern' English-French dictionary, the Collins-Robert English-French Dictionary, then as Lexicographic Adviser to Oxford University Press, where she pioneered methodology for the creation of bilingual dictionaries from corpus data, ultimately resulting in the Oxford-Hachette English-French Dictionary.

In 1987, Atkins met Charles J. Fillmore, whose Frame Semantics approach to the lexicon provided the solutions to many of her lexicographic problems. Their subsequent discussions and collaborations resulted in the development of the FrameNet project at the International Computer Science Institute, University of California, Berkeley, to which Atkins became Lexicographic Adviser. She was a member of the Advisory Board of the American National Corpus, and the International Journal of Lexicography. Among her contributions to corpus linguistics, Atkins originated the idea of the British National Corpus.

In 1997 and 1998, Atkins, together with Michael Rundell, planned and presented two week-long workshops in South Africa, for linguists and lexicographers from the eleven language communities. Subsequently, Atkins and Rundell founded the Lexicography MasterClass, providing advice, consultancy services, and training for anyone involved in, or embarking on, a lexicographic project. Shortly afterwards they invited Adam Kilgarriff to join them. 2001 saw the first of the annual international Lexicom Workshops, which continue to this day. Their other main project was the planning, design, corpora-building, lexicographer-training, and production of the Dante database. This analysis of modern English was commissioned by Foras na Gaelige for use as the basis of their New English-Irish Dictionary, and was made available to scholars world-wide. Together, Atkins and Rundell wrote The Oxford Guide to Practical Lexicography (OUP: 2008). Atkins taught and consulted in lexicography, and participated in national and international research projects in the field of computational lexicography. Her principal interests included the lexical analysis of corpus data, and in particular the use of linguistic theory as a basis for a systematic description of the language; designing databases to store lexicographic data for use by human lexicographers and computer lexicons; using such databases in the creation of monolingual and bilingual dictionaries; the training of lexicographers; and the study of how people actually use dictionaries.

== Personal life ==
Atkins grew up in Edinburgh, attending Gillespie's School, and graduating with a first class honours degree in French from Edinburgh University in 1952. She moved to Sussex in the 1970s with her husband, Peter Atkins, and had three children, including Lucy (a novelist). Academician John McHardy Sinclair was her brother.

== Honours ==
Among her honours are an honorary DLitt from the University of Brighton (2000), UK, for services to lexicography and linguistics; a festschrift (2002) published by EURALEX at the occasion of her 70th birthday to mark her contribution to international lexicography, and an honorary DLitt by the University of Pretoria (2008) for significant contributions to the development of lexicographic practices worldwide and in particular for the African languages in South Africa. She was also past president and honorary life member of the European Association for Lexicography (EURALEX).

== Publications ==
Publications list

=== Dictionaries ===
Collins-Robert English/French Dictionaries: Standard edition 1978, revised 1987; Concise edition 1981, Schools edition 1983
Oxford-Hachette English/French Dictionary (Consultant Adviser) 1994

=== Books ===
(with Tom McArthur) Dictionary of English Phrasal Verbs. London: Collins (1974)
(with Michael Rundell) The Oxford Guide to Practical Lexicography. Oxford: OUP (2008)

=== Edited essays ===
1994: (with Antonio Zampolli) Computational Approaches to the Lexicon, Oxford: Oxford University Press

1998: Using Dictionaries: Studies of Dictionary Use by Language Learners and Translators, Tübingen: Niemeyer

=== Papers ===
1985: "Monolingual & bilingual learners' dictionaries: a comparison". In: Dictionaries, Lexicography & Language Learning, (ed.) R. F. Ilson. Oxford: Pergamon. 15–24.
1986: (with J. Kegl & B. Levin) "Implicit and Explicit Information in Dictionaries". In: Advances in Lexicology: Proceedings of the Second Annual Conference of the UW Centre for the New OED, 45–63, Waterloo, Canada.
1987: (with H. Lewis, D. Summers, J. Whitcut) "A research project into the use of learners' dictionaries" in The Dictionary and the Language Learner, A. P. Cowie (ed.), Niemeyer, Tübingen. 29-43
1987: "Semantic-ID tags: corpus evidence for dictionary senses", in The Uses of Large Text Databases, proceedings of the Third Annual Conference of the New OED Centre, University of Waterloo, Canada. 17–36.
1988: (with J. Kegl & B. Levin) "Anatomy of a verb entry: from linguistic theory to lexicographic practice". In: International Journal of Lexicography, 1:2 Oxford University Press, Oxford. pp. 84–126. Also in Current Issues in Computational Linguistics: In Honour of Don Walker, Linguistica Computazionale IX-X. (eds.) A. Zampolli, N. Calzolari & M. Palmer (1994) Pisa: Giardini Editori. 237–266.
1988: (with B. Levin) "Admitting impediments". In: Information in Text, Proceedings of the Fourth Annual Conference of the New OED Centre, University of Waterloo, Canada. pp. 97–114. Also in Lexical Acquisition: Using On-Line Resources to Build a Lexicon, U. Zernik (ed.), Lawrence Erlbaum Assoc. Inc. (1991). pp. 233–262.
1990: (with F. E. Knowles) "Interim report on the EURALEX / AILA Research Project into Dictionary Use", in T. Magay & J. Zigany (eds) Proceedings of BudaLex '88, Akadémiai Kiadó, Budapest. pp. 381–392.
1991: "Corpus lexicography: the bilingual dimension", in A. Zampolli & N. Calzolari (eds.) Computational Lexicology and Lexicography I, Giardini, Pisa. pp. 43–64.
1991: "Building a Lexicon: the Contribution of Lexicography", in B. K. Boguraev (ed.) International Journal of Lexicography, 4:3, pp. 163–204. Also in Challenges in Natural Language Processing, M. Bates and R. Weischedel (eds.), Cambridge University Press, Cambridge (1993). pp. 37–7
1992: "Putting lexicography on the professional map", Proceedings of EURALEX '90, M. Alvar Ezquerra (ed.), Bibliograf SA, Barcelona. pp. 519–526.
1992: (with J. H. Clear & N. Ostler) "Corpus design criteria". In: Journal of Literary and Linguistic Computing, (ed.) Gordon Dixon. Oxford: Oxford University Press. 1–16.
1992: "Tools for computer-aided corpus lexicography: the Hector project", in Papers in Computational Lexicography: Complex'92, F. Kiefer, G. Kiss and J. Pajsz (eds.) Hungarian Academy of Sciences, Budapest. pp. 1–60. Also in Acta Linguistica Hungarica 41, F. Kiefer (ed.) (1991), Hungarian Academy of Sciences, Budapest: Akadémiai Kiadó.
1992: (with Charles J. Fillmore) "Towards a Frame-based Lexicon: the Semantics of RISK and its Neighbors", in Frames, Fields and Contrasts: New Essays in Semantic and Lexical Organization, A. Lehrer & E. F. Kittay (eds.) Lawrence Erlbaum Associates: Hillsdale, New Jersey. 75-102.
1992: (with N. Ostler) "Predictable meaning shift: some linguistic properties of lexical implication rules" in Lexical Semantics and Commonsense Reasoning, (eds.) J. Pustejovsky & S. Bergler, Springer-Verlag, NY. pp. 87–98.
1993: "Theoretical Lexicography and its relation to Dictionary-making". In: Dictionaries: the Journal of the Dictionary Society of North America, (guest editor) W. Frawley, DSNA, Cleveland Ohio. pp. 4–43.
1994: (with Charles J. Fillmore) "Starting where the dictionaries stop: the challenge of corpus lexicography". In Atkins & Zampolli. 350-393
1994: (with Beth Levin & A. Zampolli) "Computational Approaches to the Lexicon: An Overview". In Atkins & Zampolli. 17-45
1994: "A corpus-based dictionary". In: Oxford-Hachette French Dictionary (Introductory section). Oxford: Oxford University Press. xix–xxxii
1994: (with Charles J. Fillmore, J. B. Lowe & N. Urban) "The Dictionary of the Future: a Hypertext Database". Presentation and on-line demonstration at the Xerox-Acquilex Symposium on the Dictionary of the Future, Uriage, France.
1995: "Analysing the verbs of seeing: a frame semantics approach to corpus lexicography". In: Proceedings of the Twentieth Annual Meeting of the Berkeley Linguistics Society, 1994, (eds.) S. Gahl, C. Johnson & A. Dolbey, BLS, UC Berkeley, CA.
1995: (with Beth Levin) "Building on a Corpus: A linguistic and lexicographical look at some near-synonyms". In: International Journal of Lexicography, 8 : 2. 85-114.
1995: "The Dynamic Database". In: Machine Tractable Dictionaries, (ed.) Cheng-ming Guo, Ablex Publishing Corporation, Norwood, NJ. 131–143.
1995: (with Charles J. Fillmore and Ulrich Heid) "Lexicographical Relevance in Corpus Evidence", Deliverable D-IX-2 of DELIS Project (LRE 61.034).
1995: "The role of the example in a frame semantics dictionary". In: Essays in Semantics and Pragmatics, in honor of Charles J. Fillmore. (eds.) Shibatani, Masayoshi & Sandra Thompson. Amsterdam: John Benjamins. 25–42.
1996: "Bilingual Dictionaries: Past, Present and Future". In: Euralex'96 Proceedings, (eds.) Gellerstam, M., J. Järborg, S.-G. Malmgren, K. Norén, L. Rogström and C. R. Papmehl. Gothenburg: Gothenburg University, Department of Swedish. 515–590.
1996: (with Beth Levin and Grace Song) "Making Sense of Corpus Data: A Case Study". In: Euralex'96 Proceedings, (eds.) Gellerstam, M., J. Järborg, S.-G. Malmgren, K. Norén, L. Rogström and C. R. Papmehl. Gothenburg: Gothenburg University, Department of Swedish. 345–354.
1997: (with K. Varantola) "Monitoring Dictionary Use". In International Journal of Lexicography, 10:1, 1–45, and reprinted in Atkins (1998).
1997: (with Beth Levin and Grace Song) "Making Sense of Corpus Data: A Case Study of Verbs of Sound". In: International Journal of Corpus Linguistics, 2:1 23–64.
1998: (with Charles J. Fillmore) "FrameNet and Lexicographic Relevance". In: Proceedings of the First International Conference On Language Resources And Evaluation, Granada, Spain, 28–30 May 1998
1998: (with K. Varantola) "Language Learners Using Dictionaries: The Final Report of the EURALEX- and AILA-sponsored Research Project into Dictionary Use". In Atkins (1998).
1998: (with Jan H. Hulstijn ) "Empirical research on dictionary use in foreign-language learning: an overview". In Atkins (1998).
2000: (with Charles J. Fillmore) "Describing polysemy : the case of crawl". In Polysemy: Linguistic and Computational Approaches, (eds) Yael Ravin and Claudia Leacock. Oxford: Oxford University Press.
2002: (with Nuria Bel, Francesca Bertagna, Pierrette Bouillon, Nicoletta Calzolari, Christiane Fellbaum, Ralph Grishman, Alessandro Lenci, Catherine MacLeod, Martha Palmer, Gregor Thurmair, Marta Villegas, Antonio Zampolli) "From Resources to Applications. Designing the Multilingual ISLE Lexical Entry", LREC2002, Las Palmas.
2002: "Then and Now: Competence and Performance in 35 Years of Lexicography". In Proceedings of the Tenth EURALEX International Congress, EURALEX 2002, (eds.) Braasch, A. and C. Povlsen. Copenhagen: Center for Sprogteknologi. 1-28.
2003: (with Michael Rundell & Hiroaki Sato) "The contribution of FrameNet to practical lexicography", in International Journal of Lexicography, guest editor
2003: (with Charles Fillmore & Christopher Johnson) "Lexicographic relevance: selecting information from corpus evidence", in International Journal of Lexicography, guest editor Thierry Fontenelle, Oxford, OUP: 16:3 251–280
2004: Pierrette Bouillon, "Relevance in dictionary-making", in Proceedings of the First International Symposium on Lexicography, Universitat Pompeu Fabra, Barcelona, May 2002; also in Text-based Studies: Lexicography, Terminology, Translation. In Honour of Ingrid Meyer (Ed.) Lynne Bowker; Ottawa, University of Ottawa Press, 2006.
2006: (with Valerie Grundy) "Lexicographic profiling: An aid to consistency in dictionary entry design". In Proceedings of the Twelfth EURALEX International Congress, EURALEX 2006, Alessandria Italy: Edizioni dell’Orso, 1097–1107.
2007: "Me Lexicographer, You Translators: or Context-free (vs. context-sensitive) translation and what it involves", in Proceedings of 4th International Maastricht-Lodz Duo Colloquium on Translation and Meaning, Maastricht, Netherlands: May 2005.
(with Michael Rundell) "Lexicography Training: An Overview" in Dictionaries: An International Encyclopedia of Lexicography: Supplementary Volume: Recent Developments (eds.) R. H. Gouws, U. Heid, W. Schweickard & H. E. Wiegand (forthcoming from Mouton De Gruyter, Berlin).
(with Michael Rundell) "Criteria for the design of corpora for lexicography 1: monolingual dictionaries" in Dictionaries: An International Encyclopedia of Lexicography: Supplementary Volume: Recent Developments (eds.) R. H. Gouws, U. Heid, W. Schweickard & H. E. Wiegand (forthcoming from Mouton De Gruyter, Berlin).

== See also ==
- List of lexicographers
