= Michael Sperberg-McQueen =

American computer programmer (1954–2024)

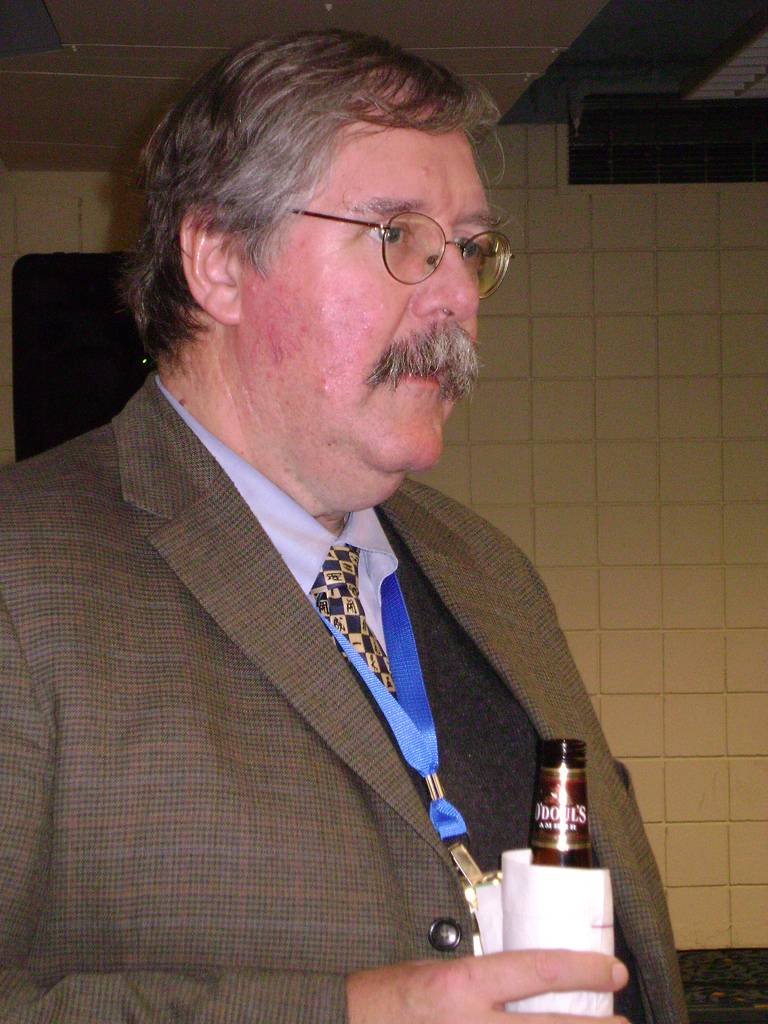
Sperberg-McQueen at the XML 2007 conference

C. Michael Sperberg-McQueen (May 18, 1954 – August 16, 2024) was an American medieval German philologist and markup language specialist. He was founder and co-chair of Extreme Markup Languages (later known as Balisage: The Markup Conference), founder and principal of Black Mesa Technologies, co-editor of the Extensible Markup Language (XML) 1.0 spec (1998), and chair of both the W3C XML Coordination Group and the XML Schema Working Group. He was editor in chief of the TEI's Guidelines and central to many of its foundational ideas.

== Biography ==
In the digital humanities sphere, Sperberg-McQueen was instrumental in the Text Encoding Initiative (TEI), an international cooperative project to develop and disseminate guidelines for the encoding and interchange of electronic text for research. He was co-editor, with Lou Burnard, of the TEI's Guidelines for Electronic Text Encoding and Interchange in 1994, and he served as editor in chief of the TEI from 1988 to 2000. Sue Polanka (Head of Reference/Instruction, Wright State University Libraries) notes that the TEI "...in the 1980s and 90s established a fundamental set of methods and practices that now underpin most digital humanities scholarship."

He held a Ph.D. in comparative literature from Stanford University, and taught and published widely on markup systems, overlapping markup, formal languages, semantic theory, and other topics.

In 2015, Sperberg-McQueen held courses on Digital Humanities at the Technische Universität Darmstadt as visiting professor. He also talked in an interview about his work experience for the Princeton University and the Symbiose of computers and humanities.

In the XML sphere (and SGML before it) Sperberg-McQueen was a member of the technical staff at the World Wide Web Consortium from 1998 to 2009. He was a co-editor of the XML 1.0 specification published in 1998, leader of the W3C's Architecture Domain from July 2001 to September 2003, a member of the XML Schema Working Group and co-editor of the XSD 1.1 specification, and a regular participant in many other activities including the Working Groups responsible for XSLT, XPath, and XQuery, and the Service Modeling Language SML. Outside W3C, he was a key participant in the Extreme Markup Languages conference series and its successor, Balisage, where he was noted for his closing talks summarizing and identifying commonalities between the papers presented over the course of a week. He regularly contributed his own papers on a wide range of topics, often positioning XML technologies within a wider philosophical and linguistic context. He addressed the challenges of overlapping markup. When W3C wound down its work on XML technologies, he remained active in community groups working on Invisible XML and on new (4.0) versions of XPath, XSLT, and XQuery.

Sperberg-McQueen died on August 16, 2024, at the age of 70.

== Education ==
Sperberg-McQueen had a background in German Studies with education at: the University of Bonn, Free University of Berlin (1975–76); an A.B. in German Studies and Comparative Literature, with distinction, and with Honors in Humanities and Honors in German Studies, Stanford University (1977); an A.M., German Studies, Stanford University (1977); Paris-Sorbonne University (1978–79), and University of Göttingen (1982–83). He was awarded a Ph.D in Comparative Literature by Stanford University for a dissertation on "An Analysis of Recent Work on Nibelungenlied Poetics." in 1985.

== Sources ==
- Home page at the Web Consortium
- http://cmsmcq.com/ – personal Web page, with selected publications at http://cmsmcq.com/doclist.html
- "XML Cup 2003 Awards Presented". Business Wire. December 10, 2003.
