= Oxford Concordance Program =

1981 text analysis software

The Oxford Concordance Program (OCP) was first released in 1981 and was a result of a project started in 1978 by Oxford University Computing Services (OUCS) to create a machine independent text analysis program for producing word lists, indices and concordances in a variety of languages and alphabets.

In the 1980s it was claimed to have been licensed to around 240 institutions in 23 countries.

== History ==
OCP was designed and written in FORTRAN by Susan Hockey and Ian Marriott of Oxford University Computing Services in the period 1979–1980 and its authors acknowledged that it owed much to the earlier COCOA and CLOC (University of Birmingham) concordance systems.

During 1985–86 OCP was completely rewritten as version 2 to increase the efficiency of the program, a version was also produced for the IBM PC called Micro-OCP.

== See also ==
- Concordance (publishing)
