= Thomason Collection of Civil War Tracts =

The Thomason Collection of Civil War Tracts consists of more than 22,000 pamphlets, broadsides, manuscripts, books, and news sheets, most of which were printed and distributed in London from 1640 to 1661. The collection represents a major primary source for the political, religious, military, and social history of England during the final years of the reign of King Charles I, the English Civil War, the Interregnum, and the English Restoration of King Charles II. It is now held in the British Library.

== Compilation of the collection ==
Bookseller and publisher George Thomason (died 1666), who maintained a shop in the churchyard of St. Paul's Cathedral in London, methodically collected and preserved the works over two decades. The tracts consist of a broad range of writings, including sermons, songs, political speeches, debates, opinions, jokes, gossip, news reports, descriptions of the trial and execution of Charles I, accounts of Civil War battles, reports from Parliament, and several regularly appearing publications that historians consider the forebears of modern newspapers. Thomason's collection represents approximately 80 percent of the published works released in England during this period.

Thomason frequently made handwritten annotations on the tracts, providing such information as publication dates and the authorship of anonymous works. During the turbulent years of the Civil War and the Protectorate of Oliver Cromwell Thomason reputedly moved the collection several times to protect the more controversial works from destruction by government or opposition censors.

== History of the collection ==
Thomason appears to have entrusted the collection to the care of Thomas Barlow, provost of The Queen's College and former librarian of the Bodleian Library at the University of Oxford, and a future Bishop of Lincoln. Between 1660 and 1664 Barlow offered the tracts, together with two copies of a manuscript catalogue to the university for £4,000 but the sale was not agreed. Thomason remained hopeful that they would be sold, and in his will dated 1664, he charged his three executors (Barlow, Thomas Lockey, and John Rushworth) with selling the collection to the University on behalf of his children.

After Thomason's death in April 1666, the negotiations fell through and the collection remained in Barlow's hands, until they were acquired about 1677–1679 by the bookbinder Samuel Mearne on behalf of the Royal Library at the Palace of Whitehall. Mearne rebound the tract volumes in a uniform manner but was never paid for his work and so retained the collection. Eventually Mearne's widow sought and obtained the permission of the Privy Council in May 1684 to dispose of them on her family's behalf. Over the next four decades various members of the Sisson family (descendants of Samuel Mearne) endeavoured to sell the collection on numerous occasions to Robert Harley, 1st Earl of Oxford and Earl Mortimer, the Bodleian Library, Thomas Thynne, 1st Viscount Weymouth, James Brydges, 1st Duke of Chandos, Frederick, Prince of Wales, the Radcliffe Library in Oxford and the antiquary and book collector "Honest Tom" Martin, but in each case the potential purchasers were put off by the high price asked.

In January 1754 Elizabeth Sisson approached Thomas Birch one of the trustees of the newly established British Museum, loaning him the 12 volume catalogue, but again nothing was to come of the sale during Elizabeth Sisson's lifetime. Finally, in 1762, John Stuart, 3rd Earl of Bute purchased the collection on behalf of King George III for the bargain price of £300 (a fraction of the cost of forming the collection). In that same year King George III donated the collection to the new British Museum at Montagu House, where they were originally known as the "King's pamphlets" and added to the Royal Library Collection. In 1973, the museum transferred the Thomason Tracts to the British Library where they continue to be housed.

== Significance of the collection ==
According to Thomas Carlyle, the Thomason Tracts were;

the most valuable set of documents connected with English history; greatly preferable to all the sheepskins in the Tower and other places, for informing the English what the English were in former times; I believe the whole secret of the seventeenth century is involved in that hideous mass of rubbish there (Report of the Commissioners appointed to inquire into the constitution and government of the British Museum.

== The Thomason Tracts today ==
Many of the publications that comprise the collection are exceedingly rare. In fact, some are not known to exist anywhere else. The tracts are bound into some 2,000 volumes and housed at the British Library's main building at St. Pancras. Because of their rarity and fragile condition, the originals are not available to general researchers. However, the library maintains paper facsimiles in its rare books collection, and in 1977 University Microfilms International released a set of 256 microfilm reels containing the entire collection. The microfilms are available at research libraries around the world. Digital facsimiles are available on Early English Books Online, via the online platform Proquest.
