= Tim Johns =

Timothy Francis Johns (1936 – 2009) was a British academic, strongly associated with the origins and development of data-driven learning (DDL), an approach to learning foreign languages which has learners use the output of computer concordancers, either interactively on screen or via paper printouts, to discover grammar rules and facts about word associations and meanings.

Johns was appointed to the fledgling English for Overseas Students Unit (EOSU) of Birmingham University in 1971 and remained there for the rest of his career. During the 1970s he developed remedial English programs for all departments, but also worked with a colleague, Tony Dudley-Evans, on an innovative team-teaching approach involving the staff of two departments, Highway Engineering and Plant Biology. Reports of this work were published by the British Council and were influential outside Birmingham, in particular on work done at the University of Malaysia. In a significant article written with Flo Davies he urged vehemently that students coming to British universities from overseas should work with authentic texts, not with decontextualised sentences or simplified readers.
