= Digital Humanities Quarterly =

- Discipline: Humanities
- Language: English
- Edited by: Julia Flanders

Publication details
- History: 2007–present
- Publisher: Alliance of Digital Humanities Organizations
- Frequency: Quarterly
- Open access: Yes
- License: Creative Commons Attribution-Noncommercial-No Derivative Works 3.0

Standard abbreviations
- ISO 4: Digit. Humanit. Q.

Indexing
- ISSN: 1938-4122
- LCCN: 2007214388
- OCLC no.: 122912409

Links
- Journal homepage

Digital Humanities Quarterly is a peer-reviewed open-access academic journal covering all aspects of digital media in the humanities. The journal is also a community experiment in journal publication.

The journal is funded and published by the Alliance of Digital Humanities Organizations and its editor-in-chief is Julia Flanders.

== Editorial policy ==
Digital Humanities Quarterly has been noted among the "few interesting attempts to peer review born-digital scholarship." Having emerged from a desire to disseminate digital humanities practices to the wider arts and humanities community and beyond, the journal is committed to open access and open standards to deliver journal content, publishing under a Creative Commons license. It develops translation services and multilingual reviews in keeping with the international character of the Alliance of Digital Humanities Organizations.

The journal aims to heighten the visibility and acceptance of digital humanities with reviews that are modeled on traditional book reviews but focus on digital projects, providing assessments of "software tools, sites, other kinds of innovations that need the same kind of critical scrutiny and benefit from the same kind of contextualizing review that a traditional book review offers."
