= OSS Watch =

United Kingdom advisory service

- Formation: 1 July 2003; 23 years ago
- Purpose: Educational
- Headquarters: Banbury Road, Oxford, United Kingdom
- Location: Oxford, United Kingdom
- Parent organization: University of Oxford
- Staff: 4
- Website: oss-watch.ac.uk

OSS Watch is the United Kingdom's advisory service for issues relating to free software and open source software, based at the University of Oxford.

OSS Watch started as a pilot project funded by the Joint Information Systems Committee (Jisc) in July 2003. It has provided consultations and briefing materials about the legal, social, technical and economic aspects of open source software. OSS Watch also organises and attends conferences and workshops relating to free and open source software, both within and outside the academic sector.

From 2003 until 2013, OSS Watch received funding via Jisc to provide support to the further education and higher education sectors. From 2013, OSS Watch is funded partly from the University of Oxford, and partly from consultancy, training and other services, and is not restricted to supporting education.

OSS Watch is not an advocacy group. Instead it seeks to provide rounded and unbiased advice and guidance, both for organisations selecting software solutions, and for those creating software.

== Services ==
OSS Watch provides assistance to organisations, communities and projects including:

- building and engagement with development communities to aid sustainability
- software license advice, to allow projects
- engaging with commercial companies for software procurement
- commercial exploitation of software outputs
- evaluation of open source or proprietary software solutions

== Open Source Options ==
In 2013, OSS Watch began publishing Open Source Options for Education, a list of free and open source software packages that could be used in place of commonly used closed-source solutions. This built upon the work of the UK Cabinet Office, which released a list for the UK public sector.

== Supported projects ==
OSS Watch provides both reactive and proactive support to a wide range of projects. Their mission is to ensure that software developed using public funding is, wherever possible, made available under free and open source licenses. Recent success stories have seen them participate in the creation of Opencast Matterhorn, a worldwide community project building audio and video capture and delivery software, as well as the migration of a W3C widget standards compliant widget engine from an EU funded project into the Apache Software Foundation's incubator.

== Publications ==
The organisation also produces a wide range of high quality and regularly reviewed briefing notes on topics relating to open source use, development and adoption. An index of these documents can be found one the OSS Watch Website. All OSS Watch materials are available for reuse under a creative commons license.

== Events ==
In addition to consultations and the production of briefing materials, OSS Watch organise a number of education and training events each year. As with their publications, OSS Watch are able to use their non-advocacy status to attract speakers from all areas of the computing sphere in order to create well informed events.

Members of OSS Watch also attend events both nationally and internationally to engage with the wider software and education communities.

== The team ==
The OSS Watch team is made up of a balance of academic and business oriented people with a wide range of backgrounds. Between June 2007 and June 2010 the team was led by Ross Gardler, a recognised open source participant (Ross has served in many roles, including Vice President of Community Development, a member of the Board of Directors at The Apache Software Foundation, President of the ASF and mentor for many other project communities). In June 2011 Ross left to form a spin-out company (and later joined Microsoft Open Technologies, Inc in 2013) and was replaced as OSS Watch manager by Sander van der Waal. In September 2012, Scott Wilson of CETIS and the Apache Wookie project joined OSS Watch replacing Sander as Service Manager. The current team features three full-time staff and several other members with a variety of backgrounds, from computer science to anthropology. The organisation's advisory committee includes representatives from the academic, not-for-profit and business sectors.

== Work with the University of Oxford ==
Although OSS Watch is a group within the IT Services unit of the University of Oxford (formerly Oxford University Computing Services), for most of its history it has been funded to operate as a national service rather than to support the university. However, one impact of the changes to national funding in 2013 has been that the organisation has focused more of its effort on supporting academic departments and central IT services at Oxford.

== Spin-out company ==
In June 2011, Ross Gardler and Steve Lee span out a company from OSS Watch. This company, OpenDirective, provides very similar services to OSS Watch in both the public and private sectors. This company remains closely connected with the University of Oxford and OSS Watch and seeks to expand the revenue streams available to OSS Watch as well as to provide more proactive support rather than just advice. OpenDirective supports a number of the flagship projects that are of interest to the commercial sector while OSS Watch continues to provide services to those projects that are solely of interest to the academic sector.
