= Linear unit grammar =

In linguistics, linear unit grammar (LUG) is an approach that describes language in chunks that unfold in real time, based on the notion that language is a sequential stream of spoken or written words. It therefore eschews a hierarchical description of language and its labels are based on discourse functions rather than on parts of speech (noun, verb, etc.) and syntactic roles (subject, object, etc.).

LUG features two types of chunks, namely those that express the message and propositions of the text (M language), and those that express organisation (O language), i.e. the structure which in other linguistic descriptions include such things as discourse markers, signposting, gambits, etc. as well as the speaker or writer's orientation, i.e. their attitude or stance to the message or to their interlocutor or reader.

LUG made its first appearance in linguistics in 2006 when John McHardy Sinclair and Anna Mauranen published "Linear Unit Grammar: Integrating Speech and Writing". In the introduction, the authors acknowledge the linguist, David Brazil, whose studies into the grammar of spoken English departed from traditional analyses.

In Linear Unit Grammar (2006), the authors describe their "study of language in use and how people manage it, handle it, cope with it and interpret it". It is a "descriptive apparatus and method which aims at integrating all or most of the superficially different varieties of English."

Linear Unit Grammar has been applied to the analysis of the poem Hills Like White Elephants.
