= European Association for Digital Humanities =

- Formation: 1973
- Type: Non-profit
- Website: eadh.org
- Formerly called: Association for Literary and Linguistic Computing

The European Association for Digital Humanities (EADH), formerly known as the Association for Literary and Linguistic Computing (ALLC), is a digital humanities organisation founded in London in 1973. Its purpose is to promote the advancement of education in the digital humanities through the development and use of computational methods in research and teaching in the Humanities and related disciplines, especially literary and linguistic computing. In 2005, the Association joined the Alliance of Digital Humanities Organizations (ADHO).

== History ==
A precursor to the association’s subsequent annual conferences was a meeting on literary and linguistic computing, organized by Roy Wisbey and Michael Farringdon at the University of Cambridge in March 1970. The year after the second conference in Edinburgh, Scotland, in 1972, the Association for Literary and Linguistic Computing was founded at a meeting at King's College, London (1973). Together with the Association for Computers and the Humanities (ACH) and the Association for Computational Linguistics (ACL), the Association for Literary and Linguistic Computing sponsored and organized the Text Encoding Initiative (TEI) in 1987.

In December 2011 the Association's name was changed to the European Association for Digital Humanities, while keeping the allc.org domain name. The change to 'EADH' was made in 2013.

== Conference ==
The first conferences of the association were held annually until 1988, when a protocol was agreed with the Association for Computing in the Humanities for co-sponsorship of joint international conferences. The venue for these joint conferences alternated between Europe and North America. The first one took place in 1989 at the University of Toronto in Canada. After the Alliance of Digital Humanities Organizations had been formed in 2005, the first joint conference with the new name “Digital Humanities” was held at the Sorbonne in Paris, France, in 2006.

== Journals ==
Initially, EADH published its own Bulletin three times a year; its journal twice yearly from 1980 to 1985. Afterwards, bulletin and journal were merged in order to become Literary and Linguistic Computing (LLC) in 1986. Literary and Linguistic Computing is a peer-reviewed, international journal that publishes texts "on all aspects of computing and information technology applied to literature and language research and teaching." Membership of the association is by subscription to LLC. As of December 2010 there were 314 individual subscribers to Literary and Linguistic Computing.

== Associated organisations ==
- Alliance of Digital Humanities Organizations (ADHO)
- Association for Computers and the Humanities (ACH)
- Society for Digital Humanities /Société pour l'études des médias interactifs (SDH/SEMI)
- Text Encoding Initiative (TEI)
- Digital Humanities im deutschsprachigen Raum (DHd)
