= Text Analysis Portal for Research =

Highlighting gateway

TAPoR (Text Analysis Portal for Research) is a gateway that highlights tools and code snippets usable for textual criticism of all types. The project is housed at the University of Alberta, and is currently led by Geoffrey Rockwell, Stéfan Sinclair, Kirsten C. Uszkalo, and Milena Radzikowska. Users of the portal explore tools to use in their research, and can rate, review, and comment on tools, browse curated lists of recommended tools, and add tags to tools. Tool pages on TAPoR consist of a short description, authorial information, a screenshot of the tool, tags, suggested related tools, and user ratings and comments. Code snippet pages also contain an excerpt of code and a link to the full code's location online.

An earlier version of the portal was based at McMaster University, and consisted of a network of six leading Humanities computing centres in Canada: McMaster, University of Victoria (in collaboration with Malaspina UC), University of Alberta, University of Toronto, Université de Montréal (law) and University of New Brunswick. TAPoR developed,

a network of nodes at universities across Canada which would have servers and local labs where the best text tools, be they from industry or other sources, could be aggregated and made available. These would be supplemented by representative texts and special infrastructure ...

This earlier version allowed researchers to experiment with text analysis tools by either using them without an account through the "TAPoR Tools" interface, or getting an account where they could define texts they wanted to operate on and create a list of favorite tools.

TAPoR has also sponsored CaSTA (Canadian Symposium on Text Analysis) conferences including The Face of Text (CaSTA 2004) which focused on text visualization. Selected papers from "The Face of Text" were published by Text Technology, a journal of computer text processing.
