= Digital Scholarship in the Humanities =

- Discipline: Digital Humanities
- Language: English
- Edited by: Edward Vanhoutte

Publication details
- Former name(s): Literary and Linguistic Computing
- History: 1986–present
- Publisher: Oxford University Press
- Frequency: Quarterly

Standard abbreviations
- ISO 4: Digit. Scholarsh. Humanit.

Indexing
- ISSN: 0268-1145 (print); 1477-4615 (web)

Links
- Journal homepage

Digital Scholarship in the Humanities is a peer-reviewed academic journal of the European Association for Digital Humanities that covers all aspects of computing and information technology applied to Arts and Humanities research. It is one of the main journals in the field of Digital Humanities. The journal is published by Oxford University Press. The journal was formerly known as Literary and Linguistic Computing, but was renamed to emphasise a broadening in its subject focus beyond literary studies.
