= Canadian Society for Digital Humanities =

Canadian professional association

- Abbreviation: CSDH; SCHN (Note: French abbreviation)
- Type: Professional association
- Legal status: Active
- Purpose: Advocate and public voice
- Region served: Canada
- Official language: English; French
- President: Barbara Bordalejo
- Website: csdh-schn.org

The Canadian Society for Digital Humanities (CSDH; French: Société canadienne des humanités numériques) is a Canadian scholarly association. The CSDH was founded as the Consortium for Computers in the Humanities (French: Consortium pour ordinateurs en sciences humaines) in 1986. The organization changed its name to the Society for Digital Humanities (French: Société pour l'étude des médias interactifs), but became the CSDH after 2007, when it was enfranchised by the Alliance of Digital Humanities Organizations.

The CSDH meets every year as part of the Congress of the Social Sciences and Humanities organized by the Canadian Federation for the Humanities and Social Sciences.

Our objective is to draw together humanists who are engaged in digital and computer-assisted research, teaching, and creation. The society fosters work in the digital humanities in Canada's two official languages, and champions interaction between Canada's anglophone and francophone communities, in all areas reflected by its diverse membership: providing opportunities for publication, presentation, and collaboration; supporting a number of educational venues and international initiatives; acting as an advisory and lobbying force to local, national, and international research and research-funding bodies; working with allied organisations; and beyond.

== See also ==
- Canadian Federation for the Humanities and Social Sciences
- List of learned societies
