= John McHardy Sinclair =

British linguist

- Born: 14 June 1933; Bo'ness, Scotland
- Died: 13 March 2007 (aged 73); Florence, Italy
- Spouses: Margaret Myfanwy Lloyd (m. 1956, divorced); Elena Tognini Bonelli (m. 1996)
- Children: 5
- Relatives: Beryl Atkins (sister)

Academic background
- Education: University of Edinburgh

John McHardy Sinclair (14 June 1933 – 13 March 2007) was a British professor of Modern English Language at Birmingham University from 1965 to 2000. He pioneered work in corpus linguistics, discourse analysis, lexicography, and language teaching.

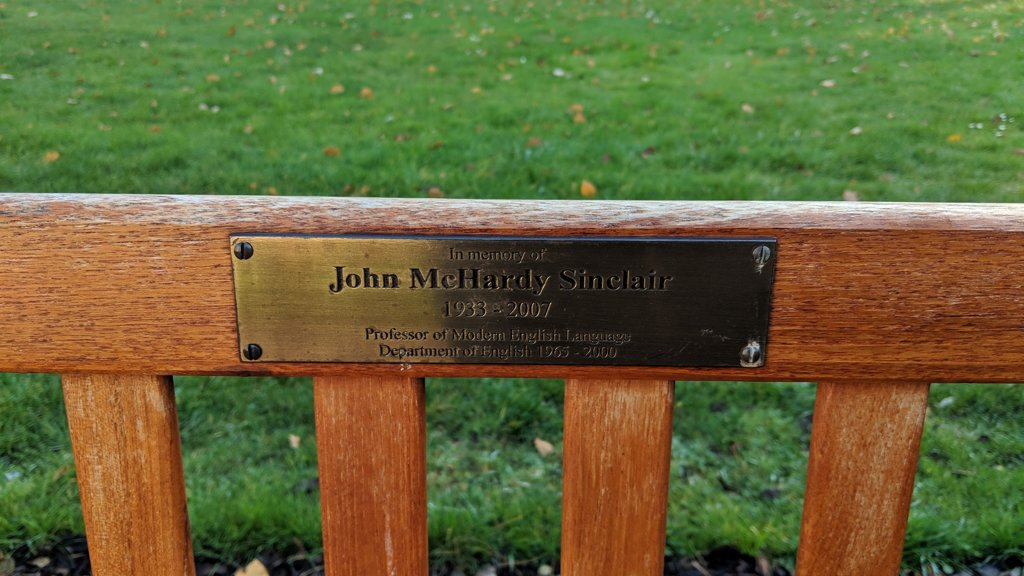
Commemorative plaque on the Birmingham University campus

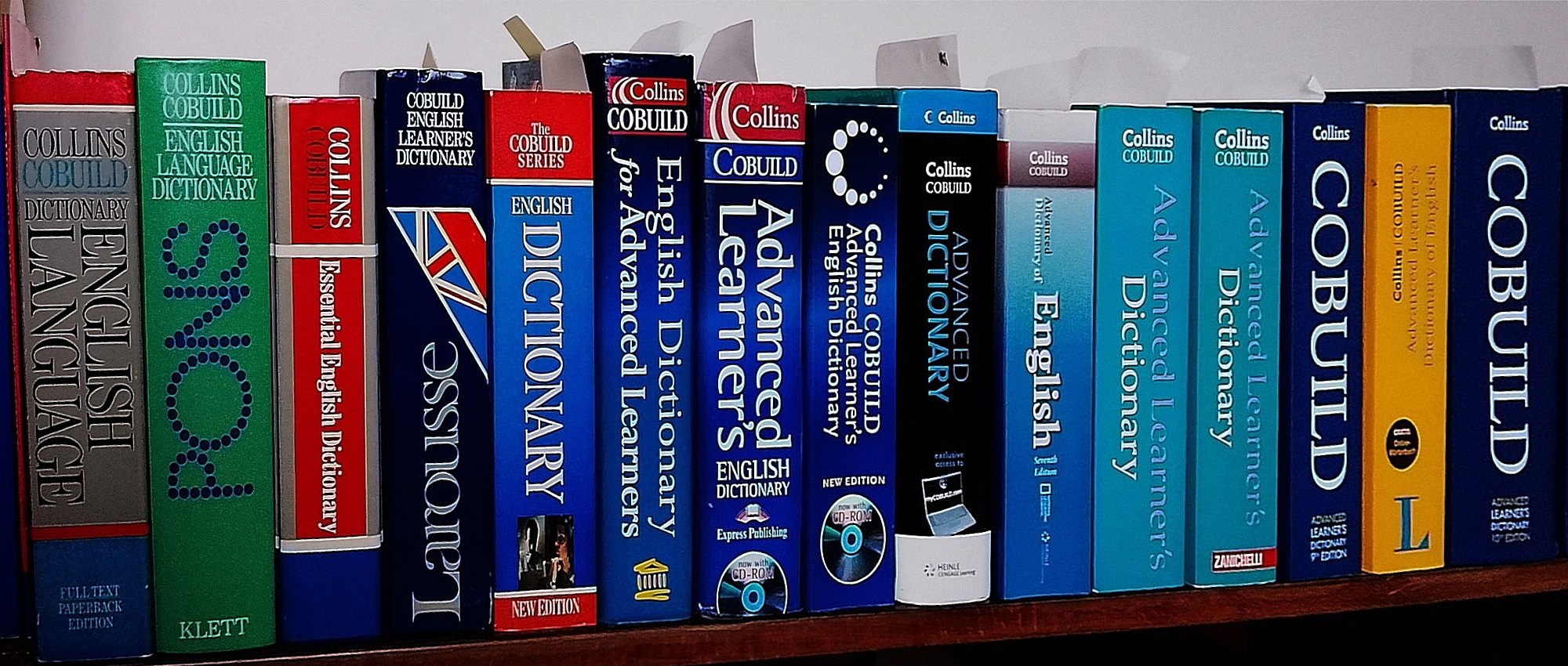
Some Collins COBUILD dictionaries published between 1987 and 2023.

== Biography ==
Sinclair was born in Bo'ness on 14 June 1933. He was educated at George Heriot's School before going on to the University of Edinburgh, where he was later a lecturer. In 1956, he married Margaret Myfanwy Lloyd. Moving from Scotland to Birmingham in 1965 with his wife and their three children, Sinclair began work at the University of Birmingham as the foundation chair of Modern English Language.

Sinclair was a first-generation modern corpus linguist and the founder of the COBUILD project. This project's aim was to build corpus-driven lexicons for foreign learners of English. He became chief adviser of Collins' Cobuild English Language Dictionary, whose first edition was published in 1987.

Sinclair was known for having unconventional ideas which helped to advance the young field of corpus linguistics. His Corpus, Concordance, Collocation formulated the "idiom principle". Though he had written many books, at his valedictory lecture in 2000 he stated that none of his many published articles passed successfully through peer-review, and that even an article he had been invited to write for a journal was peer-reviewed by mistake and rejected. Since 2000, the University of Birmingham has hosted the Sinclair Open Lecture series. This speaker series was sponsored from 2006 to 2016 by Education Development Trust, a UK education charity that Sinclair supported during his lifetime.

After early retirement from his post as professor of Modern English Language at Birmingham, Sinclair was the director and co-founder, with his second wife Elena Tognini-Bonelli – with whom he had two children – of the Tuscan Word Centre, an institution that provides training courses in corpus linguistics.

His sister was lexicographer B. T. S. Atkins.

He died of cancer at his home in Florence, Italy, on 13 March 2007, at age 73.

== Key publications ==
- John McHardy Sinclair and Malcolm Coulthard. Towards an Analysis of Discourse: The English Used by Teachers and Pupils. Oxford University Press. 1975.
- John McHardy Sinclair and David Brazil. Teacher Talk. Oxford University Press. 1982.
- John McHardy Sinclair. Corpus, Concordance, Collocation. Oxford University Press. 1991.
- John McHardy Sinclair. Reading Concordances: An Introduction. Pearson/Longman. 2003.
- John McHardy Sinclair. Trust the Text: Language, Corpus and Discourse. Routledge. 2004.
- John McHardy Sinclair. How to use Corpora in Language Teaching. John Benjamins Publishing. 2004.
- John McHardy Sinclair and Anna Mauranen Linear Unit Grammar: Integrating Speech and Writing. John Benjamins Publishing. 2006.
