= Oxford University Computing Services =

Coordinates: 51.7601°N 1.2605°W

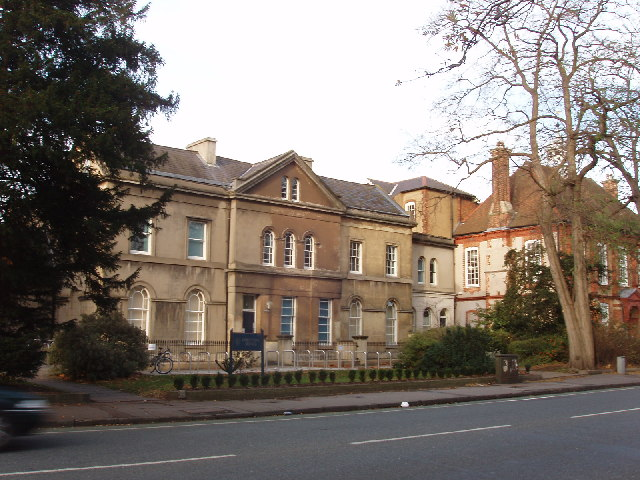
Oxford University Computing Services building on Banbury Road.

Oxford University Computing Services (OUCS) until 2012 provided the central Information Technology services for the University of Oxford. The service was based at 7-19 Banbury Road in central north Oxford, England, near the junction with Keble Road. OUCS became part of IT Services, when the new department was created at the University of Oxford on 1 August 2012 through a merger of the three previous central IT departments: Oxford University Computing Services (OUCS), Business Services and Projects (BSP) and ICT Support Team (ICTST).

At the time when Oxford University Computing Services ceased to operate as an independent department, it offered facilities, training and advice to members of the university in all aspects of academic computing. OUCS was responsible for the core networks reaching all departments and colleges of Oxford University. OUCS was made up of 5 technical and one administration group. Each group had responsibility for different aspects of OUCS services supplied to the university. At the time of the merger, the 5 technical groups were: Learning Technologies, Information and Support, Network Systems Management Services, Infrastructure Systems and Services Group, and Network and Telecommunications.

== History ==
A lease on a house was obtained in 1957 and operation started in 1958, initially as the Computing Laboratory at 9 South Parks Road, a Victorian building, now demolished to make way for the Experimental Psychology and Zoology departments. In 1963, due to space problems, the staff and computers moved to 19 Parks Road, the old Engineering Building. In 1970, the Computing Service occupied 17 and 19 Banbury Road, having split from the Computing Laboratory, which became the university's Department of Computer Science. By 1975, the Computing Service had taken over all of 7 to 19 Banbury Road, as IT Services still does today. An outpost at 59 George Street in central Oxford closed in the mid-1990s.

== See also ==
- Oxford University Computing Laboratory
- University of Cambridge Computing Service
- Oxford University Computing Services was an affiliated member of the Sakai Project
- Oxford University Computing Services was a member of the Opencast Community
- Oxford University Computing Services hosted several national and international services including OSS Watch and the Oxford Text Archive
