= Ernest Hemingway bibliography =

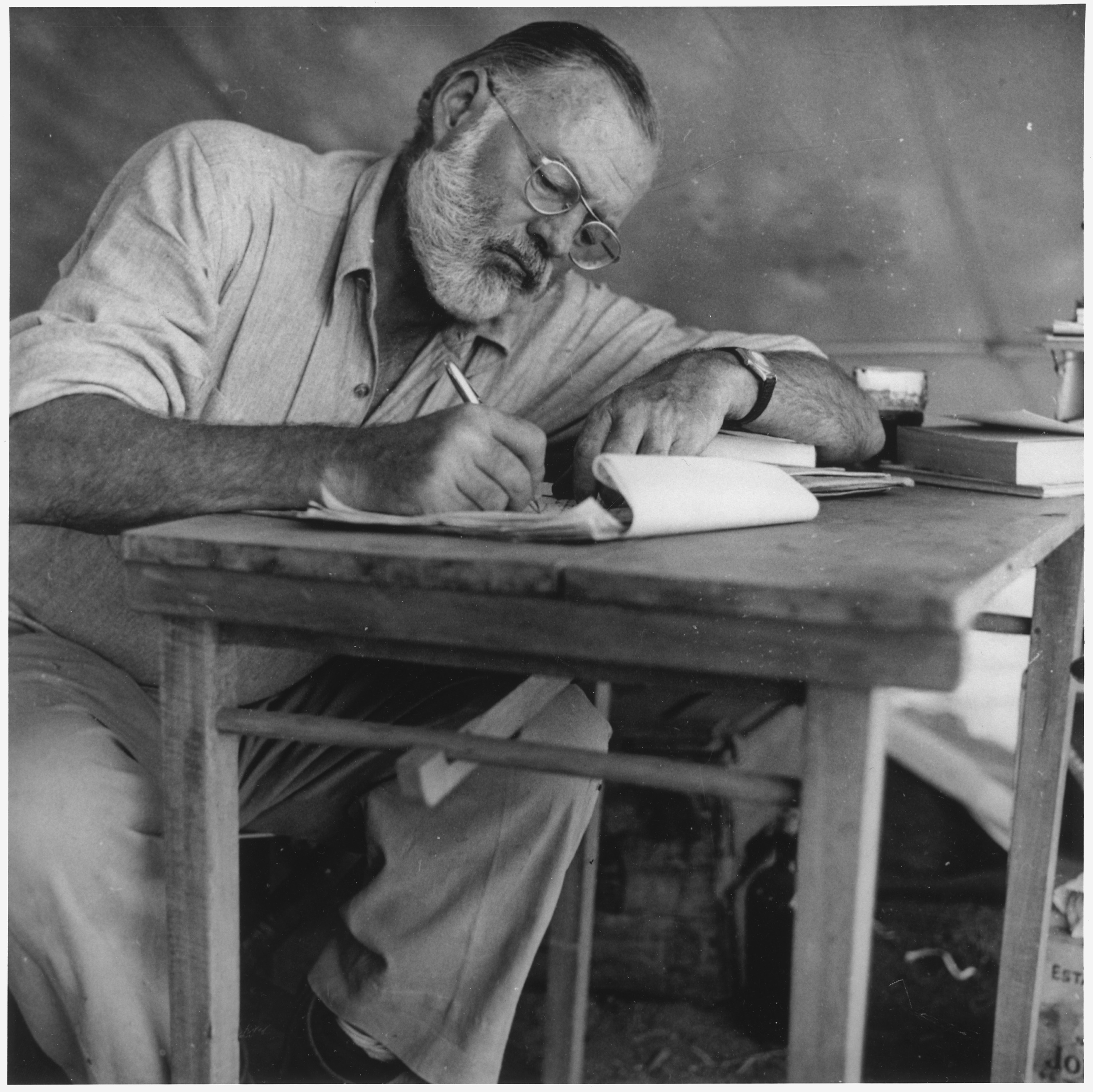
Hemingway writing in Kenya, 1953

Ernest Hemingway (1899–1961) was an American novelist, short-story writer, journalist, and sportsman. His economical and understated style—which he termed the iceberg theory—had a strong influence on 20th-century fiction. Many of his works are considered classics of American literature.

Hemingway produced most of his work between the mid-1920s and the mid-1950s, and he was awarded the 1954 Nobel Prize in Literature. He published seven novels, six short-story collections, and two nonfiction works.

Three of his novels, four short-story collections, and three nonfiction works were published posthumously.

== Works ==
=== Novels and novellas ===
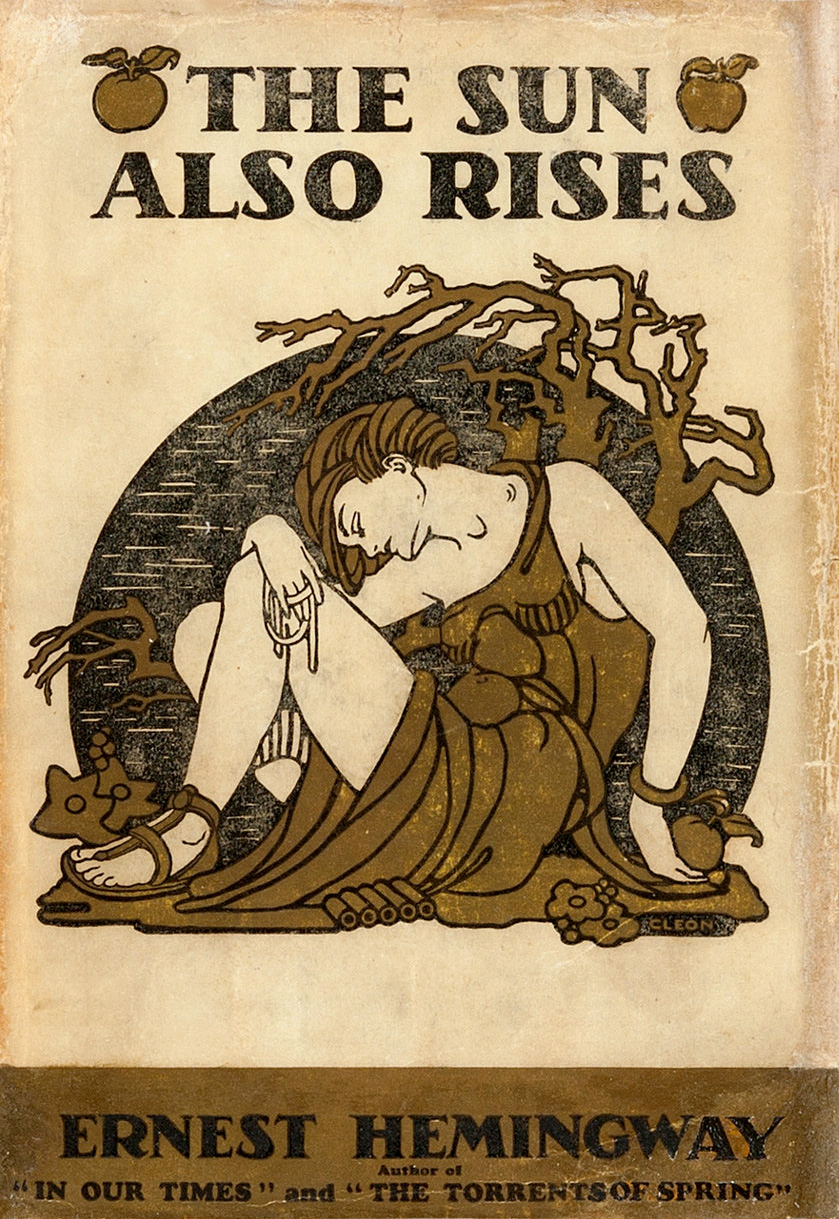
The Sun Also Rises (1926)

Table featuring novels and novellas by Ernest Hemingway
Title	Year	Publisher	Note
The Torrents of Spring	1926	Scribner's	Novella
The Sun Also Rises	1926	Scribner's	Novel
A Farewell to Arms	1929	Scribner's	Novel
To Have and Have Not	1937	Scribner's	Novel
For Whom the Bell Tolls	1940	Scribner's	Novel
Across the River and into the Trees	1950	Scribner's	Novel
The Old Man and the Sea	1952	Scribner's	Novella
Islands in the Stream	1970†	Scribner's	Novel
The Garden of Eden	1986†	Scribner's	Novel

Key
†	Posthumous publication

=== Anthologies ===
- (1942) Men at War: The Best War Stories of All Time edited, with introduction, by Hemingway, although he is not the primary author.

=== Story collections ===
In Our Time, a 1924 collection of short stories

- (1923) Three Stories and Ten Poems
- (1924) in our time (Published as a chapbook containing eighteen vignettes.)
- (1925) In Our Time (Republished in 1925 with fourteen additional short stories, incorporates the vignettes from the 1924 edition.)
- (1927) Men Without Women
- (1933) Winner Take Nothing
- (1938) The Fifth Column and the First Forty-Nine Stories (This collection includes the ones in In Our Time and Men Without Women and Winner Take Nothing.)
- (1947) The Essential Hemingway
- (1961) The Snows of Kilimanjaro and Other Stories
- (1969) The Fifth Column and Four Stories of the Spanish Civil War
- (1972) The Nick Adams Stories
- (1979) 88 Poems
- (1979) Complete Poems
- (1984) The Short Stories of Ernest Hemingway
- (1987) The Complete Short Stories of Ernest Hemingway
- (1995) The Collected Stories (Everyman's Library)
- (1999) Hemingway on Writing
- (2000) Hemingway on Fishing
- (2003) Hemingway on Hunting
- (2003) Hemingway on War
- (2008) Hemingway on Paris

=== Nonfiction titles ===
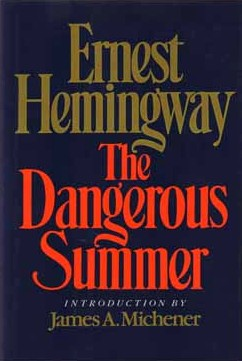
The Dangerous Summer was published posthumously in 1985.

Table featuring nonfiction works by Ernest Hemingway
Title	Year	Publisher	Ref.
Death in the Afternoon	1932	Scribner's	
Green Hills of Africa	1935	Scribner's	
The Wild Years	1962†		
A Moveable Feast	1964†	Scribner's	
By-Line: Ernest Hemingway	1967†	Scribner's	
Ernest Hemingway: Cub Reporter	1970†		
The Dangerous Summer	1985†	Scribner's	
Dateline: Toronto	1985†	Scribner's	
True at First Light	1999†		
Under Kilimanjaro	2005†		

Key
†	Denotes posthumous publications

=== Letters ===
- (1981) Ernest Hemingway Selected Letters 1917–1961
- (2011–) The Cambridge Edition of the Letters of Ernest Hemingway
  - (2011) The Letters of Ernest Hemingway: Volume 1, 1907–1922
  - (2013) The Letters of Ernest Hemingway: Volume 2, 1923–1925
  - (2015) The Letters of Ernest Hemingway: Volume 3, 1926–1929
  - (2017) The Letters of Ernest Hemingway: Volume 4, 1929–1931
  - (2020) The Letters of Ernest Hemingway: Volume 5, 1932–1934
  - (2024) The Letters of Ernest Hemingway: Volume 6, 1934–1936

=== Play ===
- (1938) The Fifth Column (published in the story collection The Fifth Column and the First Forty-Nine Stories)

== Adaptations ==
=== US/UK film adaptations ===
- (1932) A Farewell to Arms (with Gary Cooper, Helen Hayes)
- (1943) For Whom the Bell Tolls (with Gary Cooper, Ingrid Bergman)
- (1944) To Have and Have Not (with Humphrey Bogart, Lauren Bacall)
- (1946) The Killers (with Burt Lancaster)
- (1947) The Macomber Affair (with Gregory Peck, Joan Bennett)
- (1950) The Breaking Point (with John Garfield, Patricia Neal)
- (1950) Under My Skin (with John Garfield)
- (1952) The Snows of Kilimanjaro (with Gregory Peck, Susan Hayward)
- (1957) A Farewell to Arms (with Rock Hudson, Jennifer Jones)
- (1957) The Sun Also Rises (with Tyrone Power, Ava Gardner)
- (1958) The Old Man and the Sea (with Spencer Tracy)
- (1962) Hemingway's Adventures of a Young Man (with Richard Beymer)
- (1964) The Killers (with Lee Marvin)
- (1977) Islands in the Stream (with George C. Scott)
- (2008) The Garden of Eden (with Mena Suvari, Jack Huston)
- (2022) Across the River and into the Trees (with Liev Schreiber, Matilda De Angelis)

=== Television productions ===
- (1959) For Whom the Bell Tolls Playhouse 90 (with Jason Robards Jr., Maria Schell)
- (1959) The Killers CBS Buick Electra Playhouse (with Ingemar Johansson, Diane Baker)
- (1960) The Fifth Column CBS (with Richard Burton, Maximilian Schell)
- (1960) The Snows of Kilimanjaro CBS (with Robert Ryan, Ann Todd)
- (1960) The Gambler, the Nun, and the Radio CBS (with Richard Conte, Eleanor Parker)
- (1960) After the Storm (not completed)
- (1965) For Whom the Bell Tolls BBC (with John Ronane, Ann Bell)
- (1979) My Old Man (with Warren Oates, Kristy McNichol)
- (1984) The Sun Also Rises 20th Century Fox (with Hart Bochner, Jane Seymour)
- (1990) The Old Man and the Sea (with Anthony Quinn)
- (2001) After the Storm with Benjamin Bratt

In 1958, Hemingway also acquired the rights to Frederick Russell Burnham's memoir, Scouting on Two Continents, to be produced for television by CBS with Gary Cooper, but Hemingway died before production.

=== Other film adaptations ===
- (1956) The Killers (directed by Andrei Tarkovsky)
- (1999) The Old Man and the Sea (directed by Aleksandr Petrov)
