= Yamyam =

Somali poet and playwright (1946–2005)

Abdulkadir Hersi Siyad
- "عبد قادر حرس سياد "يميم
- Born: 4 September 1946; Wardheer, Somali Region
- Died: 22 October 2005 (aged 59); Columbus, Ohio, United States
- Education: Lafole University
- Occupations: Poet, songwriter
- Spouse: Ambiya C. Jaamac
- Children: Raage; Qamaan; Idil; Osame; Samawada; Ibrahim
- Writing career
- Pen name: Yamyam
- Subjects: Patriotism, love, faith, mortality
- Notable works: I am Somali; Tawaadac; Isa Sudhan; Digo Rogosho; Hooya la'aanta

Yamyam (born Abdulkadir Hersi Siyad, 4 September 1946 – October 22, 2005) (Somali: Cabdiqaadir Xirsi Siyaad (Yamyam), Arabic: "عبد قادر حرس سياد "يميم) or Yam Yam was a Somali poet and playwright. Yamyam was one of the main contributors for the Somali National Academy of Culture (SNAC), also known as the Somali National Academy of Arts, Sciences and Literature. He was active as a poet from the 1960s.

There is no one consistent English translation of his name. Alternative spellings include Cabdulqaadir and Cabdilqaadir Xirsi.

== Early life and education ==
Yamyam was born in the city of Wardheer to a Marehan family in the Somali Region of Ethiopia. His mother was Canoof Ibraahim. He was the youngest child of six and the only son to his mother; his other siblings had a different mother.

Yamyam started attending Madrasa at age four and finished studying the Quran by age eight. He attended the Somali School of Natural Sciences. He moved to the northwest of the country to pursue further education and graduated from Mogadishu University, producing his first work when he was 18 years old.

He was Muslim, following the predominant religion in Somalia.

== Career ==
He is famous both for his extensive study on peat bogs in the East Africa region and for his many poems and plays.

=== New Playwrights with New Somali Orthography ===
With the new Somali alphabet or orthography in 1972, Yamyam became a member of a minority of Somali poets who pen down his works as opposed to poets producing volumes of poems in the traditional Somali oral literature.

Yamyam was recognized as an influential Somali poet and playwright whose creative output did not wane after the state's collapse and subsequent civil war, which continued for a decade and a half. He lived in Mogadishu and continued to write poems and articles for Somali websites and newsletters on the misfortunes that befell Somalia, which was one of Africa's strongest countries during the post-colonial era.

=== First poetry competition in Hargeisa ===
Yamyam was the recipient of the first academic style Somali Poetry Competition held in Hargeisa in 1972. On Somali National Patriotic Programme Series, a 12-part series that aired in June 2013, Aamin Media Limited, placed Yamyam at episode #8. The program profiles 12 patriots and military persons who lived from mid-1400 to the modern era.

Yamyam used his poetic talents to highlight the misfortunes that befell his fellow Somalis as a result of the civil war and the ensuing chaos. He had a sense of humour that attracted both young and old across Somali society.

Suldan Tima Cade's patriotic poems throughout the 1950s to the 1970s were extended by Yamyam, who continued the patriot legacy with new interpretations of social and politics aspects in Somali life and adding his footprints on Somali literature from the early 1970s to his death in 2005.

== Moving to Mogadishu ==
After winning a first of its kind poetry competition in Hargeisa in 1972, Yamyam moved to Mogadishu, the capital of Somalia. He immediately found a job at the newly created National Folklore, Arts, Culture, Literature, which had such important cultural centers as Somali National Theatre.

At his tenure at SNAC center in Mogadishu, he wrote many poems, plays and other literary pieces. He worked for several government ministries and contributed to on-air radio programs, such as Radio Mogadishu and Radio Hargaisa, and higher-learning institutions, primarily Somali National University at Gaheyr and Lafoole.

== Poetry and public services ==
Some of his more famous poems are Gabay ammaan ah (A poem of praise), Kowda Maajo: Hambalyo 1975 (The First of May: Congratulations 1975), "Hees" (A hees poem), and Ma riyaa ma run baa (Is it a dream? Is it reality?). Two of his poems appeared in the magazines Sahan (Reconnaissance) and Horseed (Vanguard), and most of them also reached the public in oral form. Yamyam often wrote on social topics. One of his poems, for instance, was a commentary on the political situation of the Somali people in the late 1950s; and another, written in 1962, was a protest against importing foreign cars because the mass of the people were still living in poverty.

=== Researcher and contributor at SNAC ===
Yamyam was engaged in the Somali National folklore and poetry circles for nearly four decades. At the height of the Somali Military Revolution, he wrote poems directly accusing the government of attempting to create new social programs while much-needed social programs lay in abandonment. One such poem was "Digo rogasho", which he wrote in October 1984.

In the early 1970s, he went to the capital, Mogadishu, where he joined Waaberi (literally Dawn), a troupe of singers, dancers and playwrights. His genius at writing lyrics and poems was soon recognized by his contemporaries, and his songs were performed on Radio Mogadishu.

=== Influencing Somali society and politics ===
With Ahmed Farah Ali Idaajaa, Yamyam co-authored a popular play (primarily in verse) called Dabkuu Shiday Darwiishkii (The Fire That the Dervish Lit), about the anti-colonial resistance waged by the Somali Dervishes under the leadership of Sayid Mohamed Abdulle Hassan from 1900 to 1920.

Farah Idaja wrote that the first scene of Yamyam's play Dabdkuu Shiday Darwiishkii (The Fire That the Dervish Lit) depicts imagined scenes from European powers' conference in Barlin during 1884-1885 Africa colonial divisions.

"Traditional elements are moulded into a well constructed play, with skilful interweaving of plot and sub-plot and a very effective use of an ‘Invisible Voice’ (Haatuf) for conveying some of the background information [...] The play Dabkuu Shiday Darwiishkii transmutes the traditional elements of the Somali culture and adapts them to the needs of modern literature."

Although Yamyam was a patriot, he often reflected European colonial past wrongdoings from 1884 Africa divisions to the 1894 "Tripartite Accord" from Britain, Italy and Ethiopia. His poetry reflected radicalism and dislike for the misuse of power and misappropriation of public funds of the toppled regime in Somalia in the 1970s and 1980s. Yamyam was only four uncles removed from President Siad Barre, and he was not easy on him—this came to light later during the civil war, when he remained in Mogadishu despite his closeness to the overthrown president.

=== Civil war years and Arta Peace Conference ===
Before he moved to the US to rejoin his family, who had settled there after the civil war in Somalia, Yamyam lived in Mogadishu. Unfazed by the lawlessness. Throughout the 1990s, at the height of the two-decade-long Somali civil war, he did not align himself with any of the tribal factions in Somalia. He felt a moral obligation to promote peace in his troubled country.

At the Somalia National Peace Conference held in 2000, Yamyam said that the nation of Somalia was "in ruins" and said he no longer celebrated national holidays.

Yamyam is survived by his wife, four sons and two daughters. Rage, the eldest son of Yamyam, is a poet in his own right. He was one of the main entertainers at the 2007 annual Somali Community gathering honoring youngsters who achieve great academic success. Unlike most Somali poets, Yamyam penned down all his literary work starting from early on before he won the first academically conducted poetry competition held in Hargaisa.

In print material, the poet's name has varying spellings for his nickname, Yamyam or Yam Yam. Many people believe Yamyam was a long ago deceased poet at the time of Hooyaaleey style Somali poetry during the mid eighteenth century at time of Raage Ugaas and others because of in-depth content which he is unique for in his field as a great poet coupled with the academic work which he penned down, for example, his first play co-authoring with Ahmed Farah Ali 'Idaja', using the newly created Somali orthography.

Ordinarily, Somali poets produce volumes of oral literature full of tribal feud, but Yamyam was an academic type; thus, he refrained from using poetry and plays to "side with any of opposing sides", although he remained in Mogadishu throughout the 1990s, when Mogadishu was the epicenter of the Somali civil war. In 2001, Yamyam moved to Nairobi, Kenya to settling in Nairobi.

While contributing to volumes of poems and dozens of plays for a span of nearly forty years, Yamyam is credited with numerous contributions and collaborations during the height of the civil war in Somalia from 1991 to his death in Columbus, Ohio, in 2005. He was greatly appreciated at his appearances at the year-long Somali National Peace Conference, better known as Arta Peace Conference, held in Arta, Djibouti.

Yamyam grew up in Hargaisa, but he remained in Mogadishu for much of his working life, including a decade and a half, a period when the Somali civil war years were at a climax. When it came to showing his patriotism, Yamyam gave hours of poetry entertainment and a dose of reality for the year-long Arta Somali Peace Conference.

During the Arta Peace Conference, on the occasion of June 26, Northern Somalia Independence Day, he reminded every Somali that he no longer celebrated independence days as Somalia "lay in ruins", since the chaos and lawlessness in the capital, Mogadishu.

== Later life ==
Abdulkadir Hersi Siyad, better known by his nickname Yamyam, died in a car accident in Columbus, Ohio, United States, aged 60.

== Works ==
- The Fire that the Dervish Lit ("Dabkuu Shiday Darwiishkii ")
- I am Somali (Soomali baan ahay)
- The First of May: Congratulations 1975 (Kowda Maajo: Hambalyo 1975)
- Caku Geellu muu Dido!
- A poem of praise (Gabay ammaan ah)
- Is it a dream? Is it reality? (Ma riyaa ma run baa)
- Oness of God (Tawxiid) 1984
