= Sepoltuario =

Italian death register

Sepoltuario (pl. sepoltuari, Italian) is a register in which the burials in a specific Italian cemetery are noted.

In the pre-modern era in Italy, sepoltuari were registers in which the sepulchers of families or confraternities were recorded in a particular church or in a specific cemetery. The analysis of these registers is an important source of historical documentation. Among the best known is Stefano Rosselli's "Sepoltuario Fiorentino" of 1657, of which there are several manuscript copies, including one kept in the Archivio di Stato di Firenze (Manoscritti, vols. 624 and 625).

Derived from the Italian word for burial (sepultura), manuscript sepoltuari were compiled by church officials as part of their regular record keeping to monitor who had burial rights in the tombs on their grounds, including relatives and descendants of the men and women named in memorial inscriptions as well as members of the socio-spiritual confraternities so popular in Florence at the time. These ledgers were organized spatially, as scribes listed tombs in relation to a church's high altar and to each other, completing the tombscape of the church interior before heading outdoors to record tombs in cloisters and other exterior spaces used as crypts and cemeteries. Reading a sepoltuario mimics the act of walking through a church, across the transept and up and down the aisles, stopping at each tomb to recognize who is buried therein.

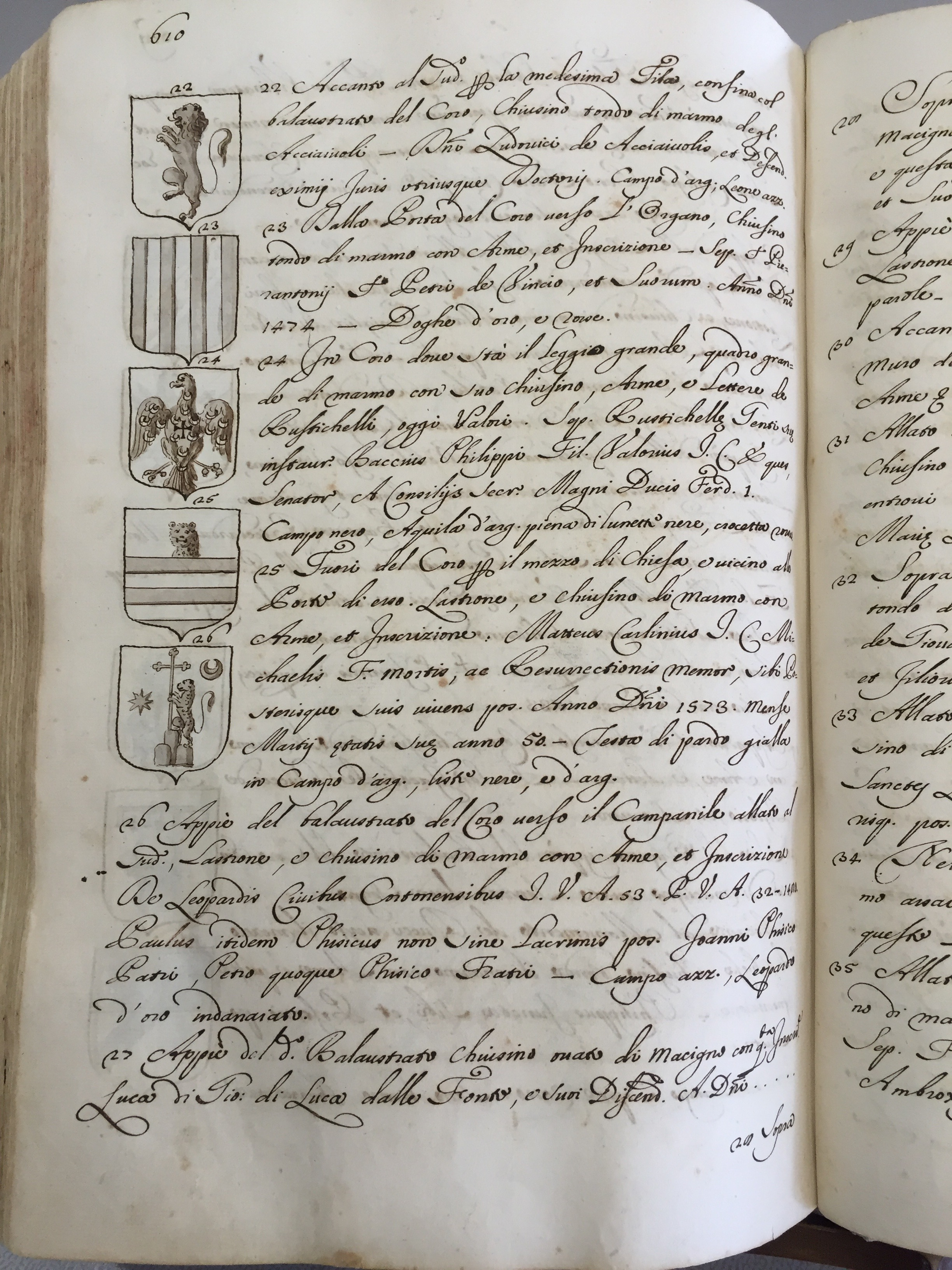
ASF, Manoscritti, 624 (Stefano Rosselli Sepoltuario Fiorentino), p. 610

The most basic sepoltuari provide numbered lists of tombs written in the manner of the inscriptions carved on their tombs. More commonly, scribes added details about the form of each tomb, including whether it included a stone slab or remained a simple brick or otherwise undeveloped grave. Over time, custodians added notes to these entries regarding upgraded memorials, changes in ownership, and/or the names of heirs entitled to and responsible for family tombs. Sometimes, church officials copied their own sepoltuari, adding watercolor drawings of coats of arms as well as new tombs installed since the compilation of the original records. Beginning in the early seventeenth century, Florentine antiquarians compiled these discrete church ledgers into new, multi-church sepoltuari, including details about the placement of each tomb; its relationship to neighboring memorials and other church furnishings; and the tomb’s form, materials, and decorative components, including verbal and pictorial descriptions of heraldic symbols. These drawings and color notes enable readers not only to match a sepoltuario entry with its corresponding tomb monument but also to ensure proper identification of clans that used a common surname but were not kin, and therefore had a distinct heraldic symbol (or none at all). Since 2016, the Institute for Advanced Technology in the Humanities, a division of the University of Virginia Library, has been building a Digital Sepoltuario to make the information contained Rosselli's sepoltuario searchable and to enhance it with additional data on the groups and individuals found in his registry entries.
