= Posthumous publication =

Publishing a work after the creator's death

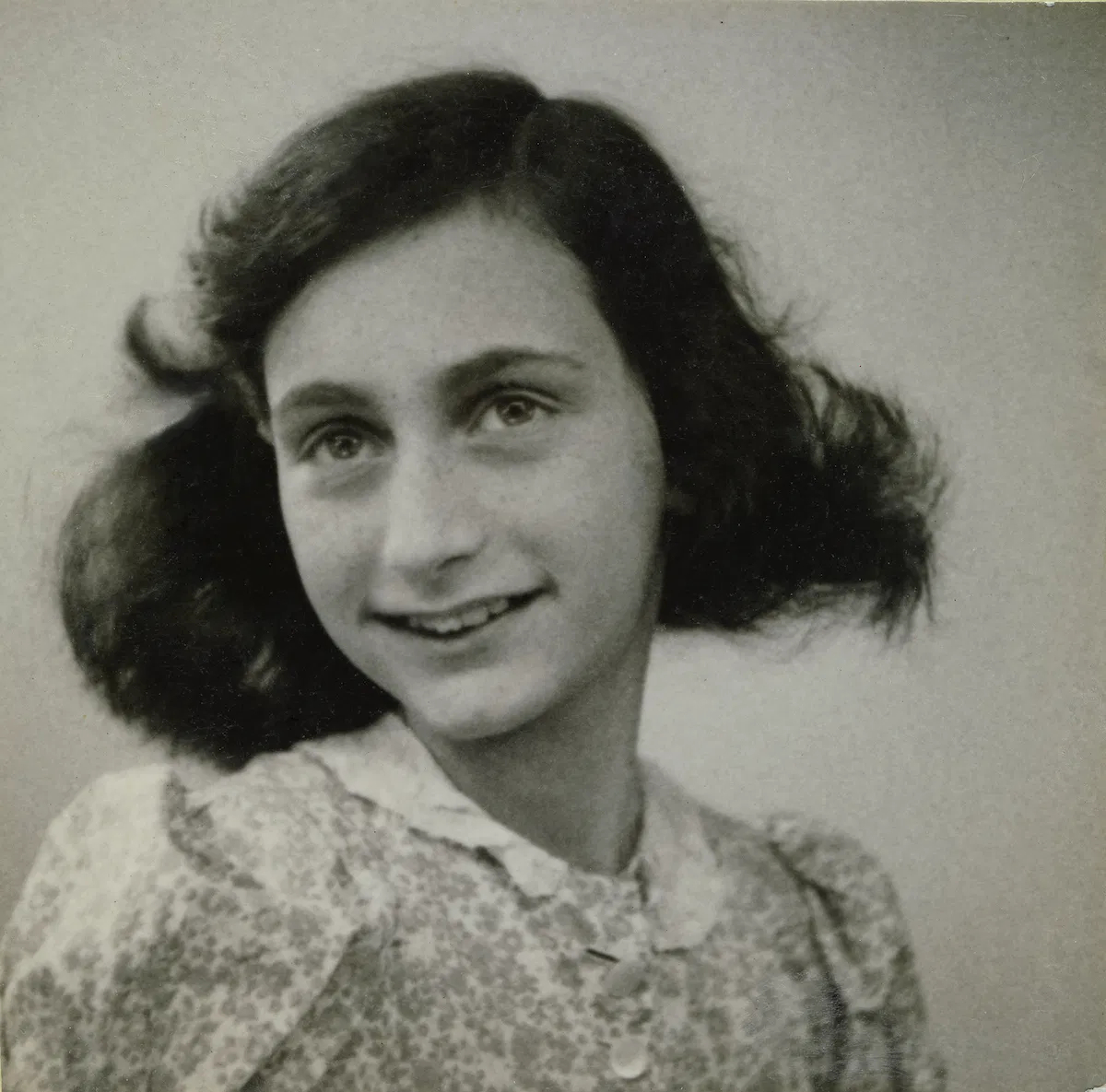
Anne Frank, whose diary was published posthumously

Posthumous publication refers to publishing of creative work after the creator's death. This can be because the creator died during the publishing process or before the work was completed. It can also be because the creator chose to delay publication until after their death. Posthumous publication can be viewed as controversial when people believe the author would not have wanted the work made public or would not have approved the version that was published.

== Reasons for posthumous publication ==
=== Death before planned publication ===
A creator may die when publication was planned during their lifetime and the material is ready for publication in its final form. For example, the composer Jonathan Larson died the day before his musical Rent opened off-Broadway. When Stieg Larsson died, he had submitted the first two of the Millennium novel series to a publisher.

A carbon copy of A Confederacy of Dunces by John Kennedy Toole was found by his mother after his death in 1969. It was finally published in 1980, and won the Pulitzer Prize for Fiction in 1981. A posthumous collection of Sylvia Plath's poems won the Pulitzer Prize for Poetry in 1982.

=== Unfinished works ===
An author may die before the work is completed. Such works may be published in their unfinished state, such as The Canterbury Tales or Franz Schubert's Unfinished Symphony. In other cases, additional authors add to the surviving manuscript to produce a completed version for publication. A prolonged period may pass between the death of the initial author and completion of the work: following Alexandre Dumas's death in 1870, his novel The Knight of Sainte-Hermine was completed by Claude Schopp and published in 2005.

=== Intentionally delayed publication ===
Works may be published posthumously because the author did not wish to publish during their lifetime. Dr. Seuss (Theodor Seuss Geisel) proposed a story in 1988 but "worried educators wouldn't like it". After Seuss's death, his sketches for the book were found, and with the blessing of his widow, the book was published in 1998 as Hooray for Diffendoofer Day!

E. M. Forster's novel Maurice is a story of love between two men. The first draft was written in 1913 when homosexuality was illegal in England. Homosexual acts were legalised by the Sexual Offences Act 1967 but Forster still did not publish because "He knew the endless fuss and brouhaha it would [lead] to". The novel was finally published in 1971, a few months after Forster's death.

Similarly, work may remain unpublished because of external censorship or reluctance of publishers to promote the work. D. H. Lawrence's novel Mr Noon was not published during his lifetime because his publisher thought its sexual content would lead to protests.

=== Material not intended for publication ===
A creator may decide not to release work because they feel it is not of sufficient quality. Critics of a collection of poems by Philip Larkin argued that many of the poems were unfinished or from early in his career, and that he would never have wished them to be made public. Vladimir Nabokov left instructions that drafts of The Original of Laura should be burnt after his death, but in 2009 it was published.

An author may also have intended text to remain private. Ernest Hemingway wrote, "It is my wish that none of the letters written by me during my lifetime shall be published" but many of them were subsequently published in Ernest Hemingway: Selected Letters, 1917–1961.

== Additional authors ==
=== Role of the editor ===
The editor of posthumously published works cannot receive feedback from the author. There is therefore no way of knowing what the author would have thought of the final result. Francesca Peacock describes posthumous edits to Ernest Hemingway's The Garden of Eden as "an editorial version of Frankenstein's monster ... without the hand of the author to make it truly whole", and she quotes Barbara Probst Solomon as saying that "in almost no significant respect is this book the author's".

=== Editing material for re-publication ===
Works that were published during the author's lifetime may be edited after the author's death for posthumous re-publication. Examples include texts that have been edited many times previously and where the author's original words are not universally agreed, such as in Shakespeare's plays. Material can be re-translated into more modern language or as an attempt to represent the original text more accurately. In the 19th and early 20th centuries performing musicians would release interpretive editions of classical compositions that differed from the composer's original notation.

Posthumous editing can be controversial. In 2023, Penguin Random House announced the Roald Dahl's children's novels would be republished in the United Kingdom with changes to the text to keep them "relevant for each new generation". The edits were described by Salman Rushdie as "absurd censorship", and Queen Camilla was said to be "shocked and dismayed".

=== Co-authorship ===
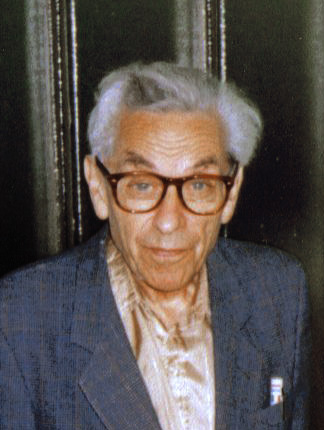
Paul Erdős in 1992

Co-authorship between multiple authors is common in academic publishing. For medical journals, the International Committee of Medical Journal Editors recommendations include rules on who can be included as an author, and similar rules apply in other fields (see Academic authorship). While authors who die during the peer-review or publishing process may have met all criteria, co-authors who die before the paper is completed cannot comply with the requirement to have "agreed all of the contents". Marek Kosmulski coined the term "necroauthorship" to refer to scientific misconduct in which ineligible deceased co-authors are included in a paper's author list.

Since the mathematician Paul Erdős died in 1996, more than 60 scientific papers have been published with him listed as an author. Erdős's posthumous publications attracted particular attention as any co-authors consequently had an Erdős number of 1. At least four people have gained an Erdős number of 1 since 2000.

=== Ghost authors ===
Ghostwriters are used in many creative fields to help improve quality or increase the quantity of material produced. Such arrangements can continue after death. This might be for a single text, such as Alex Haley completing The Autobiography of Malcolm X. It can also extend to multiple books. V. C. Andrews is credited with publishing 48 novels since her death, and Robert Ludlum created the Covert-One series with the intention that it would be continued after his death.

=== Artificial intelligence ===
In 2019, Huawei used artificial intelligence on a smartphone to generate a melody for third and fourth movements of Schubert's Unfinished Symphony. Composer Lucas Cantor then orchestrated the smartphone's melody.

== Autobiography ==
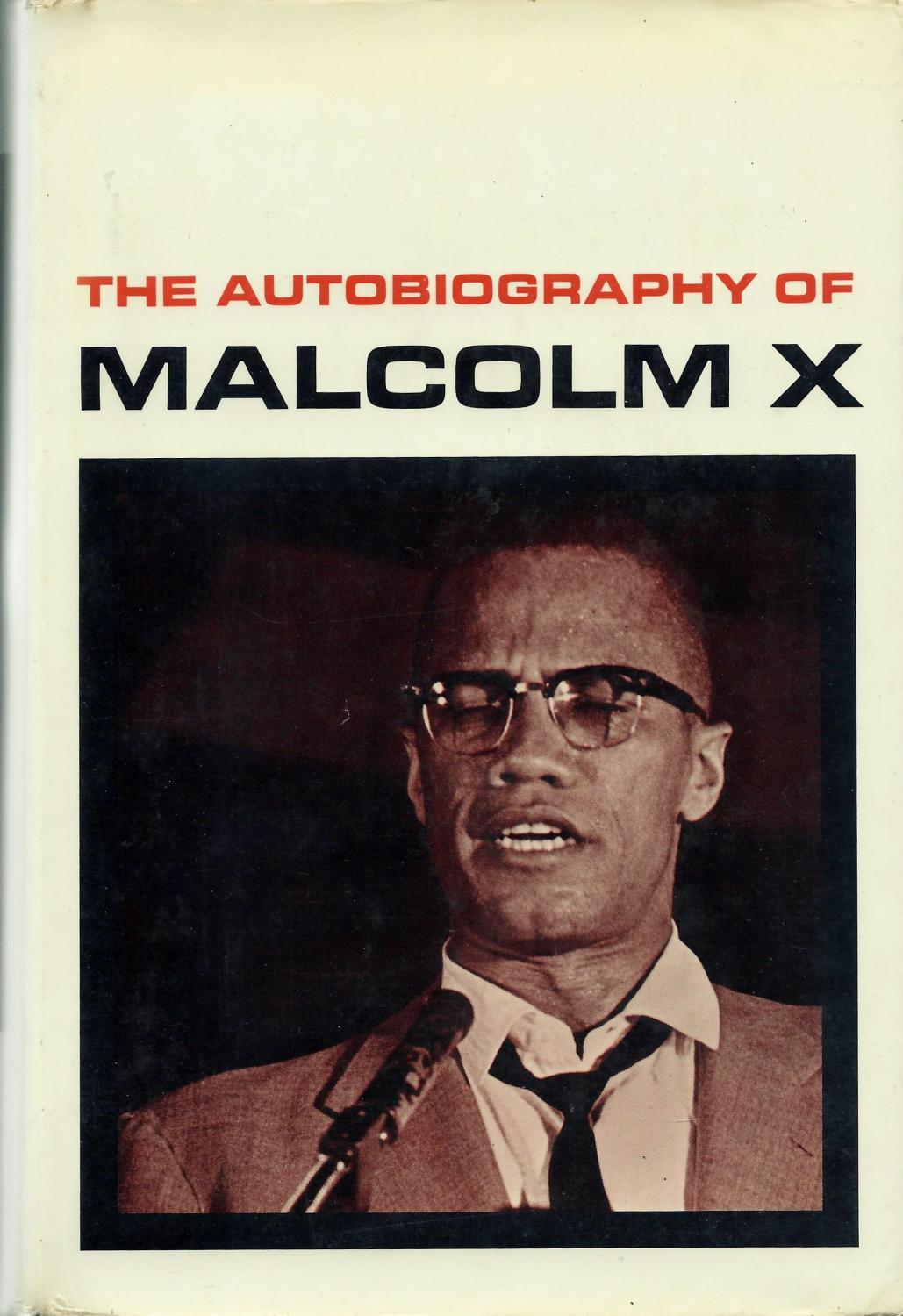
The front cover of The Autobiography of Malcolm X

Autobiographical material may be published posthumously for the same reasons as other material. When Alan Clark died in 1999 he had published one volume of his diaries and had begun preparing the second volume for publication. Margaret Thatcher prepared an autobiography for posthumous release. Mark Twain did not want his autobiography to be published until 100 years after his death because he did not like the idea that people would be hurt by what he said about them. After Twain died in 1910, various abridged versions his autobiography were published, but the most complete version was not released until 2010, as he had requested.

Some autobiographies are planned as collaborations between the subject and a second author. Malcolm X had been writing his autobiography with the author Alex Haley. After Malcolm X's assassination, Haley had to complete the work himself.

Brian Norman describes a particular characteristic of the posthumously completed autobiography: that it is described as a first-person account but has not been seen by that person. He comments on the use of the word "autobiography" and the omission of any author names on the cover (such as on The Autobiography of Malcolm X) to foster this first-person impression. But he also comments on how the subject of the autobiography may be referred to in the third person by the end of the book, as happens for example in the epilogue of Malcolm X's autobiography and the final pages of Alan Clark's The Last Diaries.

Other books described as posthumous autobiographies were not written as such, but are collections of the subject's work collated after their death. For example, Lorraine Hansberry's To Be Young, Gifted and Black is a collection of private writing and public statements collated by her husband Robert B. Nemiroff. Similarly, The Autobiography of Martin Luther King, Jr. is a collation of King's writing, described in its preface as an "approximation of the autobiography that King might have written had his life not suddenly ended" (quoted by).

=== Diaries ===
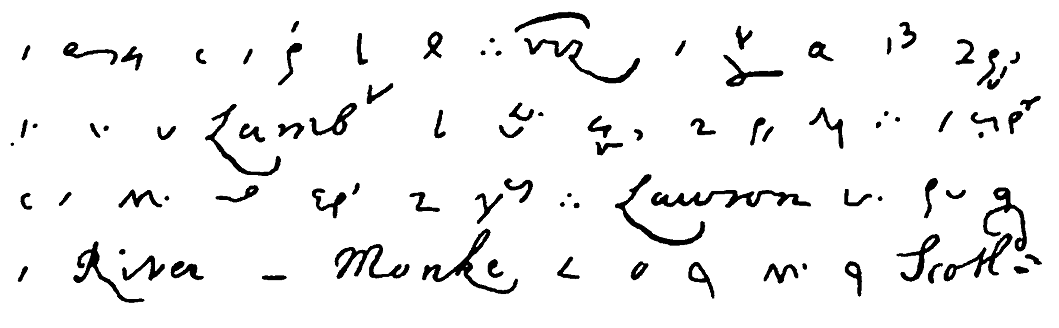
A facsimile of the first entry in Pepys's diary

Many diaries are published posthumously. Some authors plan to publish their diaries but die before publication is completed.

Samuel Pepys's diary was first published in 1825, more than 100 years after his death. Pepys did not arrange for its publication but he did arrange for it to be available to read in the Pepys Library at Magdalene College, Cambridge.

Diaries may be published posthumously when the author's death has come suddenly or soon after the events recorded. Robert Falcon Scott's final diary entries describe conditions outside his tent on the Antarctic expedition that would claim his life.

Anne Frank initially wrote her diary as a private journal, then rewrote it with plans for publication. Her father had it published in 1947, two years after her death.

== Academic publishing ==
When a scholar dies they may leave many unfinished and unpublished documents and notes. These documents may be referred to by the German word Nachlass. Some authors leave instructions for these documents to be destroyed after their death, or attempt to destroy them themselves. For example, the British philosopher Gilbert Ryle is said to have "hated the Nachlass industry and thought that he had destroyed everything of his that he had not chosen to publish himself." Anthony Palmer states that Ryle "certainly would not have approved" that a couple of his papers have been published since he died. In contrast, Austrian–German philosopher Edmund Husserl invited colleagues to work on his Nachlass while he was still alive.

== See also ==
- List of works published posthumously
- List of people who achieved posthumous recognition
