= William White (academic) =

American journalist, educator and historian (1910–1995)

- Born: William White; September 4, 1910; Paterson, New Jersey
- Died: June 24, 1995 (aged 84); Bloomfield Hills, Michigan
- Education: University of Tennessee at Chattanooga (BA, 1933); U.C.L.A. (MA, 1937); University of London (PhD, 1953)
- Occupations: Professor of journalism, writer, bibliographer
- Spouse: Gertrude Mason (m. 1952)
- Children: 2 sons
- Writing career
- Period: 1947–1981
- Genres: Essays, literary criticism
- Subjects: Journalism, literature
- Notable awards: Fulbright (1963-1964); National Endowment for the Humanities fellowships; Distinguished Alumnus from the University of Tennessee at Chattanooga (1984)

William White (September 4, 1910 – June 24, 1995) was an American journalist, writer, educator and literary historian. He was professor of Journalism and American Studies at Wayne State University from 1947 to 1980, and set up and chaired the journalism program at Oakland University. He edited collections of the works of Walt Whitman, A. E. Housman, and Ernest Hemingway, and wrote over forty books and thousands of articles. In 1969, he was reputed to own the world's largest collection of books published by Hemingway.

== Education ==
Born in Paterson, New Jersey, White was trained at the University of Tennessee at Chattanooga (BA, 1933), the University of California, Los Angeles (MA, 1937), and the University of London (PhD, 1953).

== Career ==
Following his military service in the Military Intelligence Corps during the Second World War, White taught Journalism and American Studies at Wayne State University from 1947 to 1980, and set up and chaired the journalism program at Oakland University. Before retiring in 1981, he also taught in colleges in California, Washington, Texas, Ohio, and Rhode Island.

In parallel with his academic career, he held a job as reporter, columnist and editor of more than a dozen daily and weekly newspapers in Chattanooga, Los Angeles and Detroit, covering a wide range of topics including sports and auto racing for the Detroit area newspapers. Each year White edited a special Whitman section of the Long Islander, the newspaper founded by Walt Whitman with whom he shared a newspaperman's concern with the condition of American literature. He was the editor of the Walt Whitman Review for twenty-six years, and co-editor of the Walt Whitman Quarterly Review (with Ed Folsom) for six years and its editor emeritus from 1989 until his death in 1995. He was also the bibliographer of The Hemingway Review for seventeen years, from 1970 until the fall of 1988. The lead item in the first issue of Hemingway notes (spring 1971) was his supplement to Audre Hanneman's Ernest Hemingway: A Comprehensive Bibliography (1967), to which he contributed a ten-page list of articles published about Hemingway between 1966 and 1970.

In addition to writing thousands of academic articles on many American and British authors, including John Donne, Emily Dickinson, Wilfred Owen, A. E. Housman and W. D. Snodgrass, White published over forty books, including By-Line: Ernest Hemingway (1967), which was translated into fourteen languages and made the New York Times best-seller list. In Walt Whitman's Journalism (1968), he was the first to demonstrate the extent and variety of Whitman's accomplishments in journalism. He returned to Hemingway's journalism by publishing Dateline: Toronto (1985), a collection of stories Hemingway wrote for the Toronto Star between 1920 and 1924. In 1969, White was credited with possessing the world's largest collection of published works by Hemingway.

After retiring in 1981, he taught in Israel and in Florida, lived briefly in California, and settled for a while near the University of Virginia, returning to Michigan when his health deteriorated. He died from pneumonia in a care facility in Bloomfield Hills, just north of Detroit.

== Personal life ==
White married Gertrude Mason (1915–2009) in 1952. They lived in England while he completed doctoral study at the University of London and then settled in Franklin, Michigan when he took a position teaching Journalism and American Studies at Wayne State University. They had two sons, Geoffrey and Roger, and three granddaughters.

== Awards ==
He won a Fulbright of American Literature to Korea in 1963-1964, several National Endowment for the Humanities fellowships, and the Distinguished Alumnus Award from the University of Tennessee at Chattanooga in 1984.

== Selected works ==
- By-Line: Ernest Hemingway (1967)
- Walt Whitman's Journalism: A bibliography (1969)
- The Merrill guide to Ernest Hemingway (1969)
- The Merrill checklist of Ernest Hemingway (1970)
- Edwin Arlington Robinson: a Supplementary Bibliography (1971)
- Nathanael West: A comprehensive bibliography (1975)
- The Bicentennial Walt Whitman : essays from the Long-Islander (1976) – edited by William White
- The Collected Writings of Walt Whitman: Daybooks and Notebooks (1978)
- Walt Whitman: Leaves of Grass. A Textual Variorum Of The Printed Poems 1870-1891 (1980) – 3 vol. Edited by Sculley Bradley, Harold W. Blodgett, Arthur Golden, William White
- 1980, Leaves of grass at 125 : eight essays (1980) – edited by William White
- Dateline: Toronto (1985)

== Sources ==
=== Books ===
- Hemingway, Ernest (1967). White, William (ed.). By-Line: Ernest Hemingway (hardcover) (1st ed.). New York, NY: Charles Scribner's Sons. (dust jacket).
- LeMaster, J. R.; Kummings, Donald D., eds. (1998). Walt Whitman: An Encyclopedia (hardcover) (1st ed.). Abingdon-on-Thames: Routledge. ISBN 978-0-8153-1876-7.
- Moddelmog, Debra A.; del Gizzo, Suzanne, eds. (2012). Ernest Hemingway in Context (softcover). New York, NY: Cambridge University Press. ISBN 978-1-107-42931-4.
- Oliver, Charles M. (2012). "Chapter 44. The Hemingway Review and The Ernest Hemingway Foundation and Society". Ernest Hemingway in Context (softcover). New York, NY: Cambridge University Press. pp. 429–434. ISBN 978-1-107-42931-4.

=== Journals, newspapers and magazines ===
- Benson, Jackson J. (March 2, 1986). "DATELINE: TORONTO; THE COMPLETE TORONTO STAR DISPATCHES, 1920-1924 by Ernest Hemingway; edited by William White". Los Angeles Times. Los Angeles, CA.
- Eberwein, Jane (2009). "IN MEMORIAM: Distinguished Professor and Professor Emerita of English, Gertrude White, 1915–2009" (PDF). Oakland University Repository. Oakland University.
- Folsom, Ed (Spring 1995). "William White, 1910–1995" (text, photo). Walt Whitman Quarterly Review. 12 (4). Iowa City, IA: University of Iowa: 205–208. doi:10.13008/2153-3695.1455. ISSN 2153-3695.

=== Websites ===
- Kummings, Donald D. (1995). "White, William (1910–1995)". The Walt Whitman Archive.
- "Distinguished Alumnus/Alumna Award (1969-2018)". University of Tennessee at Chattanooga. 2019.
- "Dr. William White, professor of journalism at Wayne State University". Historic Images. 1969. Archived from the original on July 12, 2020.
