= Scholarly primitives =

Academic research principles

Scholarly primitives are core, underlying aspects or activities that occur in all academic research regardless of discipline. Originally described as the 'most generic and principal parts of any research process in the humanities', they were first introduced as a concept in the digital humanities. Since then, the idea has been generalised to apply to all academic disciplines.

== Initial definition and list ==
The term was coined in 2000 when John Unsworth sought to identify a basic set of tasks that all humanities scholars might share as the basis for 'manageable but also useful tool-building enterprise in humanities computing'. For example, scholars in many humanities disciplines want to compare items of analysis, 'whether those objects are texts, images, films, or any other species of human production'.

His original list of primitives was:

- discovering
- annotating
- comparing
- referring
- sampling
- illustrating
- representing

== Updates and interpretations ==
Since then, Unsworth's original primitives have been widely used and updated.

Among the places the idea has been discussed are in Schreibman, Siemens and Unsworth's collection A Companion to Digital Humanities (2004). There John Burrows talked of using "scholarly primitives" as a way of establishing what digital tools needed to be developed to support digital humanities research.

John Unsworth in discussion with Charlotte Tupman, later (2012) further discussed the idea. He noted that some of the originally proposed 'primitives' may be further decomposed and hence may not actually be 'primitive'. He also singled out annotation as having unresolved problems - annotations and texts must be connected but still be kept separable/ separate since a researcher needs their annotations to be private while they develop their research etc.

Willard McCarty also discussed the idea in 2002. He made a link between the primitives and the possibility of interoperability of systems: "In the language of systems theory, such components are known as 'primitives, that is, the lowest-level building blocks of the system;25 by definition, interoperability specifies an open-ended system. Our task, then, is not to define all the relevant primitives, rather a sufficient number to allow actual research and a means for defining others." He discussed the idea again in 2005 making a similar point.

Later work by Carole Palmer, Lauren Teffeau and Carrie Pirmann (2009) further developed the idea. They say 'The notion of the primitive is distinct in that it is meant to refer to activities that are common across disciplines, at least within the humanities where the concept was originally developed and applied, and the examples provided by Unsworth suggest that the activities are relatively discrete in nature. In our application, we refine the concept further by emphasizing a sense of the primitive as something at the base or beginning of a larger process.'

They defined five scholarly primitives for all academic research as:

- searching
- collecting
- reading
- writing
- collaborating

plus some others for the humanities in general:

- browsing
- collecting
- note taking.

These were identified as key component activities of everyday academic work, particularly common in humanities disciplines. They used Unsworth's work to develop 'a framework of scholarly information activities' to help research libraries consider how to support 'researcher information behaviour'.
