= Harry Sylvester =

American novelist

Harry A. Sylvester
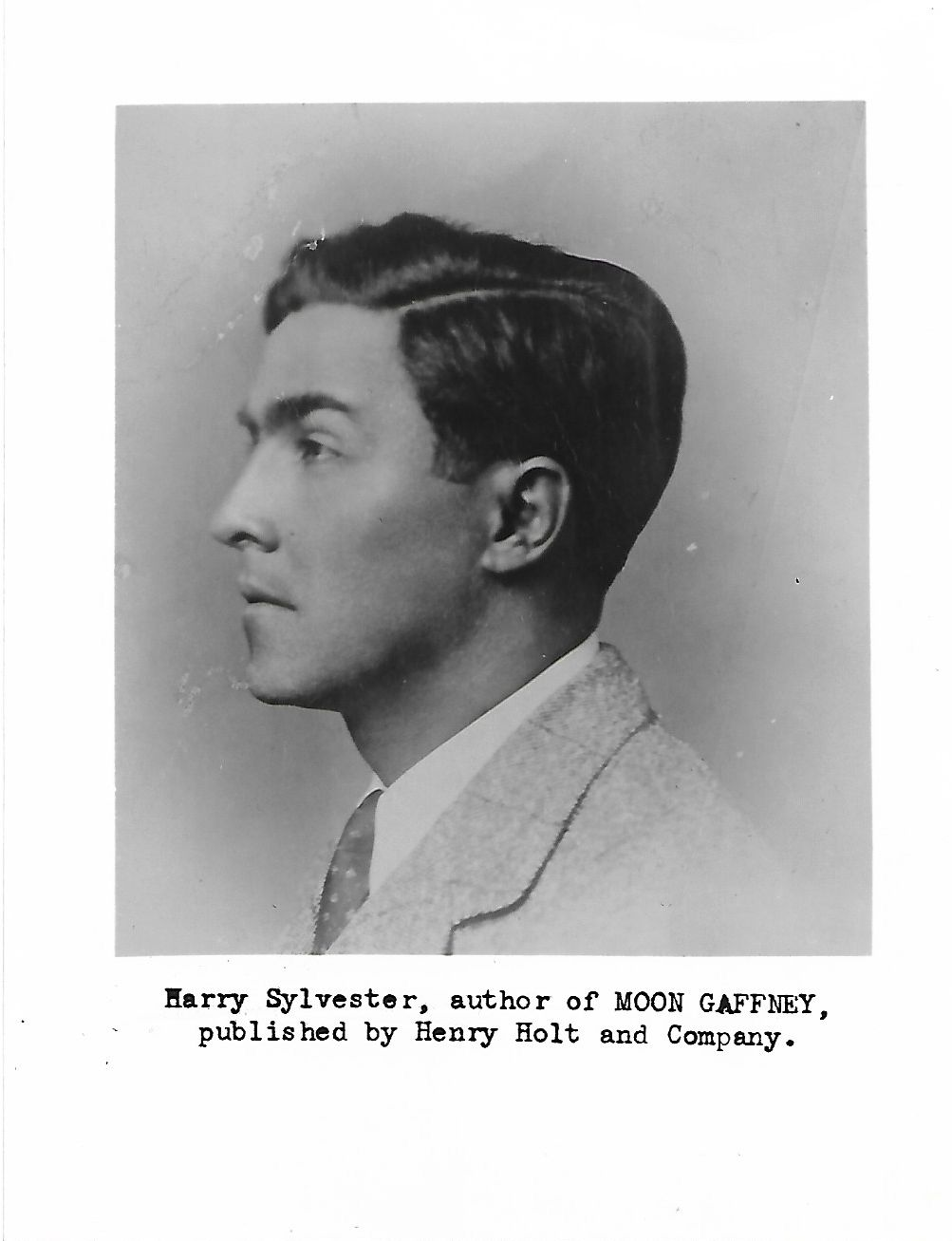
- Born: January 19, 1908; Brooklyn, New York
- Died: September 26, 1993 (aged 85); Sandy Spring, Maryland
- Education: University of Notre Dame
- Occupations: writer, critic, journalist
- Spouses: Rita Ryall Davis (m. 1936; div. 1955) Janet Hart (m. 1955)
- Writing career
- Notable works: Dearly Beloved; Dayspring; Moon Gaffney
- Notable awards: O. Henry Prize (1934)
- Literary movement: Catholic Literary Revival

Signature
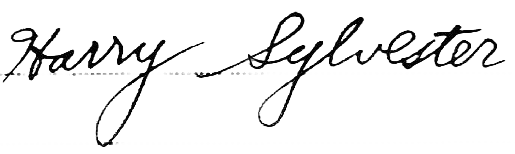

Harry Ambrose Sylvester (January 19, 1908 – September 26, 1993) was an American short-story writer and novelist in the first half of the 20th century. His stories were published in popular magazines such as Collier's, Esquire, Columbia, and Commonweal. The most popular of his novels were Dearly Beloved (1942), Dayspring (1945), and Moon Gaffney (1947). He was asked to turn John Steinbeck's script for Alfred Hitchcock's Lifeboat (1944) into a short story. This version was published in Collier's in 1943, with Steinbeck and Hitchcock both receiving writing credits.

He is remembered primarily as the author of Dayspring and a friend of Ernest Hemingway.

== Early life ==
Sylvester was born in Brooklyn, New York in 1908. His grandfather was Jeremiah Curtin, a folklorist who influenced W. B. Yeats's interest in Irish mythology.

His father, Harry Sylvester Sr., was heavily involved in politics during the 1920s and 30s, serving as a Republican in New York in a number of capacities.

After graduating from Manual Training High School in Brooklyn, Sylvester went to Notre Dame in 1926. There, he played football for Knute Rockne. During his time as an undergraduate, he served a regular sports editor and contributor to the school's weekly newspaper, Scholastic. During college, he also worked as a lifeguard in New York which would prove influential for some of his early short stories. He graduated in 1930 with a degree in journalism.

Soon after graduating from college, Sylvester found work as a correspondent for the New York Evening Post and a reporter for the New York Herald Tribune. Sylvester wrote mostly about sports, especially football and baseball. During this time, he traveled to Florida to follow the Brooklyn Dodgers.

In 1936, he wed Rita Ryall Davis of Manhattan. They had four children together, John, Anne, Joan, and Clare.

== Literary career ==
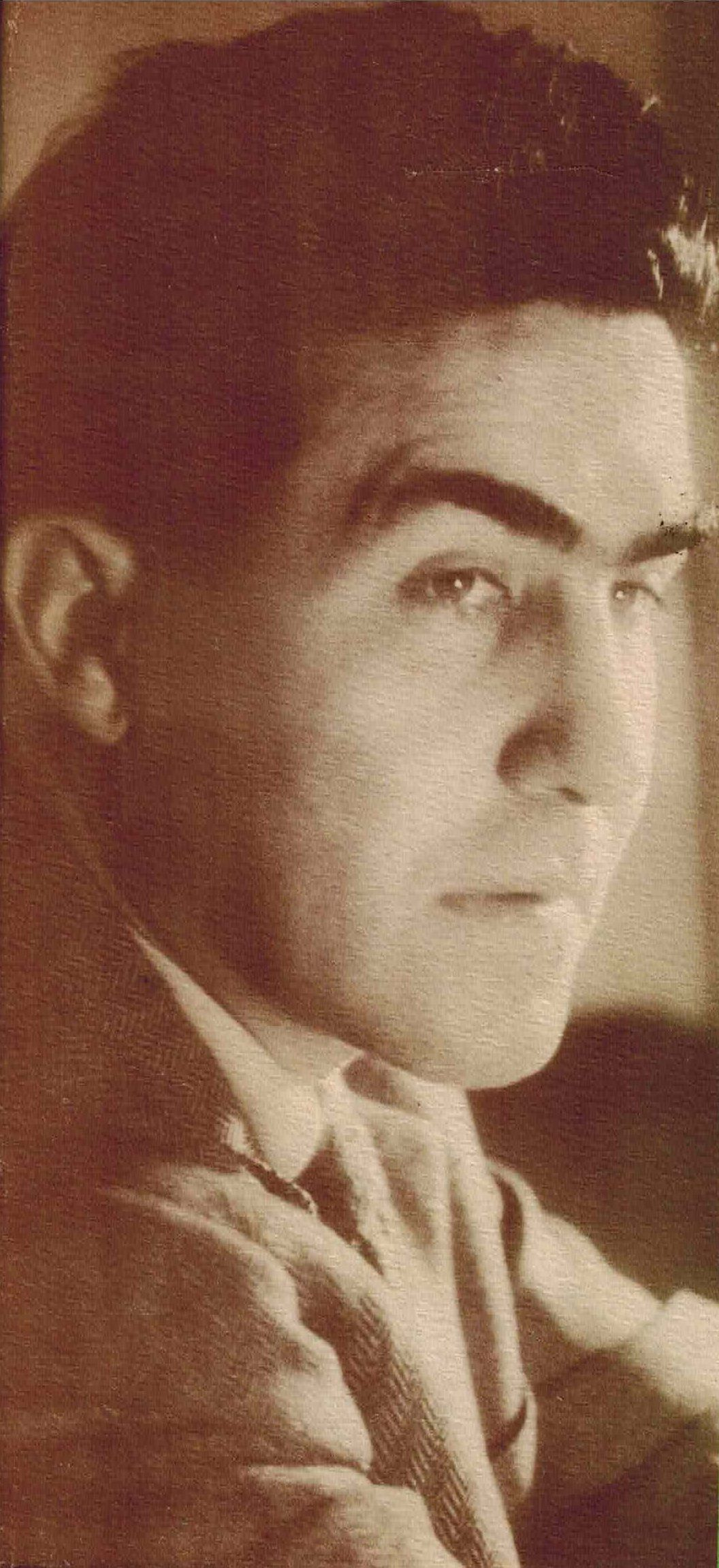
Sylvester's photo on the dust jacket of his 1950 novel A Golden Girl

In 1933, Sylvester gave up a full-time job as a journalist in order to concentrate on his fiction writing. His first novel, Big Football Man, was released that same year. The novel, a bildungsroman, revolves around the young football star Sebastian as he navigates the complexities of college life. Sylvester drew upon his own experiences playing for Notre Dame for the story.

Dearly Beloved, his second novel and the first of his religious trilogy, was published in 1942. This novel deals with issues of racism and economic inequality, looking particularly at the Catholic Church's role in navigating such societal issues. Set in Southern Maryland, Dearly Beloved is "about a small group of Jesuit priests doing what we might call missionary work among the hard-drinking, amoral, fiercely color-conscious poor whites, and the Negroes." Sylvester conducted extensive research into the area, the Jesuits, and the concept of co-ops for this novel.

He followed this up with a third novel in 1945, Dayspring, which follows the investigations of an atheist anthropologist named Spencer Bain. The story chronicles Bain's research into the Hermanos de Luz (or the Penitente Brotherhood) and his subsequent conversion to Catholicism through the process. The fictional town in which the story takes place, Tarale, is based upon the real town of Taos, New Mexico. The novel also presents a fictionalized version of Mabel Dodge Luhan and her community of artists, whom Bain repudiates in favor of the provincial Catholics. Sylvester deals realistically with themes such as adultery and abortion in Dayspring, which earned the novel mixed reviews upon its publication. The story was inspired by his trips to New Mexico. Dayspring was Sylvester's first novel to attract international attention; the literary publishing house, Rich & Cowan, released an edition of the book in 1949.

His fourth novel, Moon Gaffney, was published in 1947. Moon Gaffney's story centers on a young man torn between his political ambitions and his religious ideals. Sylvester dedicated Moon Gaffney to a group of "good Catholic radicals," including John C. Cort and Dorothy Day. Like his novel, Dearly Beloved, Sylvester was accused of pushing anti-clerical views after publication. During his lifetime, Moon Gaffney was the most popular of his novels, to the point that the novel was translated into Polish by Maria Kłos-Gwizdalska and printed in 1955, with French and Italian translators also approaching Sylvester for permission to bring his work to Europe. Sylvester declined all translation requests, except for that of Klos-Gwizalska. The book was reprinted in 1976 by Arno Press, which briefly revived interest in Sylvester's work.

While traveling and researching for his novels, Sylvester wrote short stories to support his wife and children. This sometimes meant laying aside his larger works, something that continually bothered Sylvester. He would later detail this problem in a speech, "Problems of the Catholic Writer," which was later printed as an essay for the Atlantic Monthly (January 1948).

In 1948, Sylvester arranged a collection of his short stories and published them under the title All Your Idols. According to the author's note, the book contains stories originally printed in various magazines including Collier’s, Esquire, Story magazine, Scribner’s magazine, Columbia magazine, Good Housekeeping, The Western Review (formerly the Rocky Mountain Review), and Commonweal. The collection received generally favorable reviews.

Sylvester's final published novel, A Golden Girl, is set in Peru and is his least overtly religious work. Based upon his own travels to Latin America, the story follows a young American expatriate in Lima during the bullfight season, and the fallout he experiences after becoming romantically involved with a troubled young woman from New York. It was his most critically derided work.

He was also a prolific writer of book reviews, publishing over 100 reviews for outlets such as Commonweal and the New York Times between 1931 and 1974.

== Later life ==
The publication of this final novel coincided with the beginning stages of his divorce from Rita in 1951, as well as his official repudiation of the Catholic Church. Rita died in 1978.

He formally renounced his membership in the Catholic church in 1954 and joined the Quakers. He remarried that same year and his second wife, Janet Hart Sylvester, joined the Quakers with Sylvester.

He didn't publish a novel after 1950. But Sylvester did not completely give up writing; he took up work for the US Information Service for twenty years, retiring in 1971. During that time, he wrote scripts for the Voice of America radio broadcasts and regularly contributed to local newspapers. He spent the last 40 years of his life in the Washington, DC area. His wife, Janet, died on September 20, 1987. In letters to Cort, Sylvester expressed deep grief over the loss of Janet and the difficulty he had after her death. Sylvester spent the last five years of his life at the Friends Nursing Home in Sandy Spring, Maryland. He died after a long battle with Parkinson's disease on September 26, 1993.

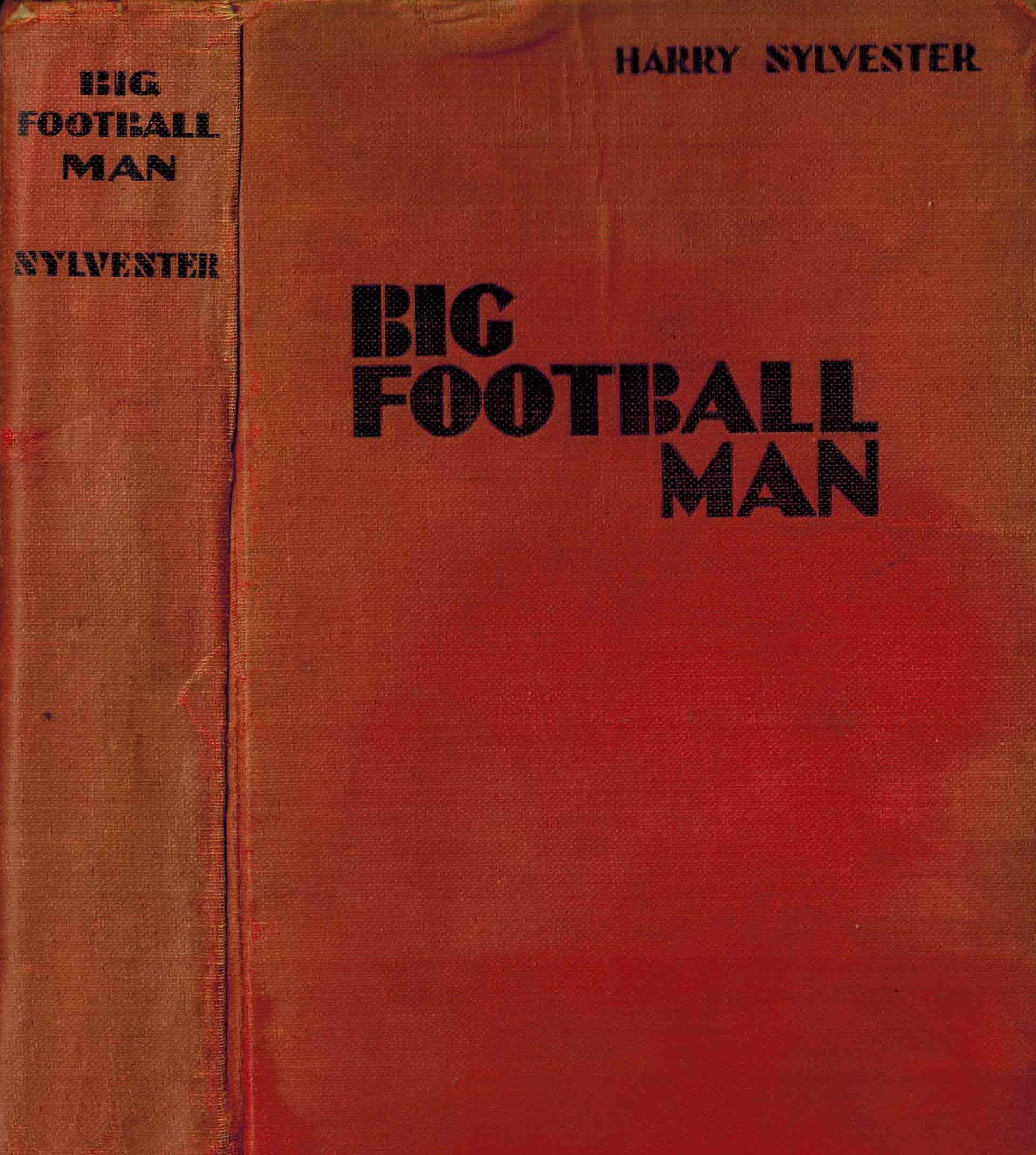
The first edition of Big Football Man published in 1933 by Farrar & Rhineheart Inc.

== Legacy ==
Sylvester was a friend and correspondent of Ernest Hemingway in the 1930s; several letters to him from Hemingway appear in the latter's Selected Letters. He also regularly exchanged letters with J. F. Powers and Richard T. Sullivan. By mid-century, he was considered to be a very promising writer in Catholic circles; he was mostly known for his critical views of the Catholic hierarchy.

The University of New Mexico, University Libraries, Center for Southwest Research has a collection of bibliographic material and book reviews by and about Sylvester (and Willa Cather). His complete papers are housed in Georgetown University Library's Special Collections, and include correspondence, manuscripts and three unpublished novels, Watch in the Night, The Young Men, and The Youth (and Education) of Don Lorenzo.

== Novels ==
- Big Football Man (1933)
- Dearly Beloved (1942)
  - Reprinted by Angelico Press (2024) ISBN 979-8886770803
- Dayspring: A Novel (1945)
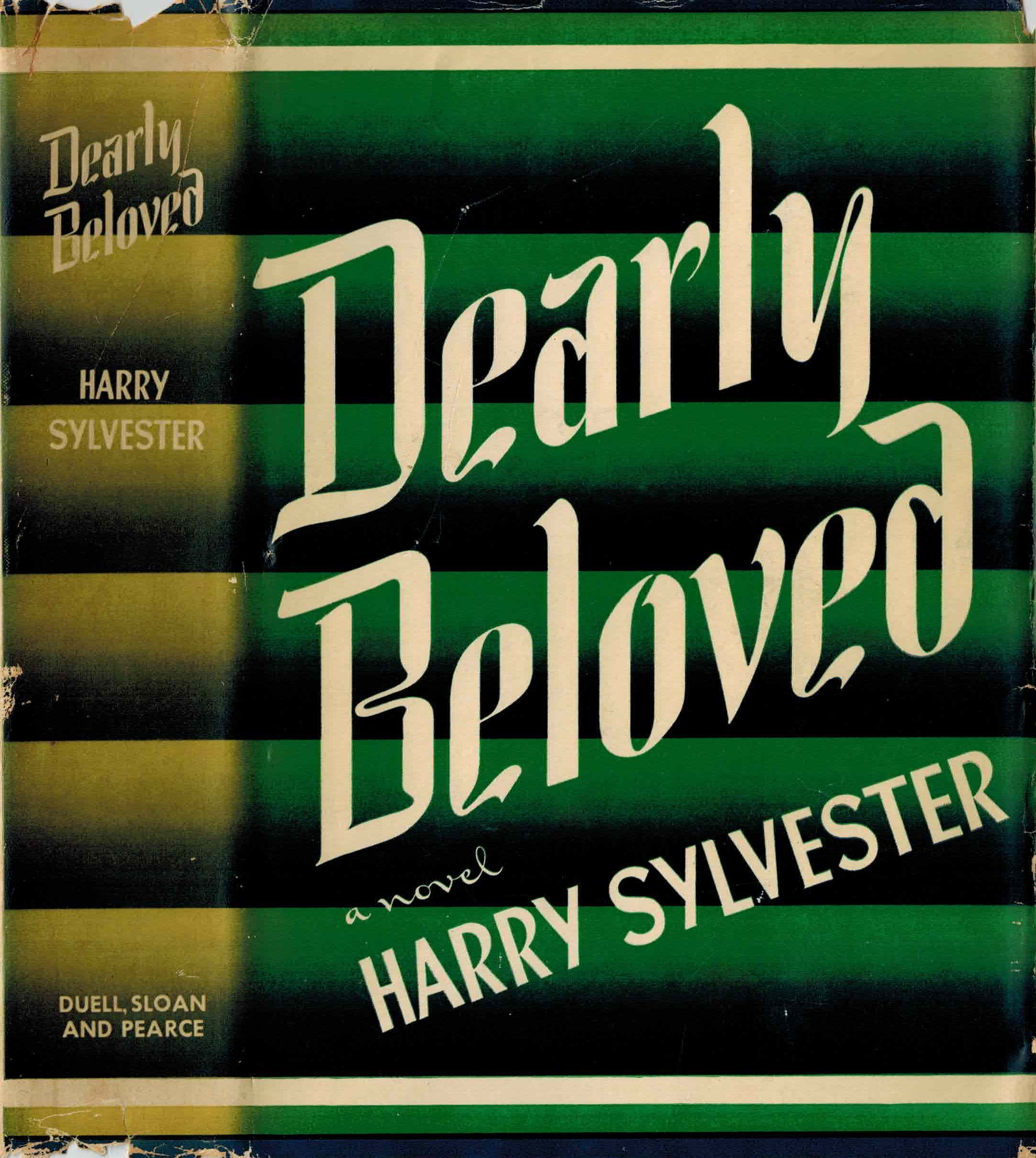
  The first edition of Dearly Beloved published in 1942 by Duell, Sloan, and Pearce.
  - U.K. printing by Rich & Cowan, London (1949)
  - Reprinted by Ignatius Press (2009) ISBN 978-1586173227
- Moon Gaffney (1947)
  - Reprinted by Arno Press (1976) ISBN 0405093594
  - Wcześniej czy później, Polish translation (1955)
  - Reprinted by Angelico Press (2024) ISBN 979-8886770780
- A Golden Girl (1950)

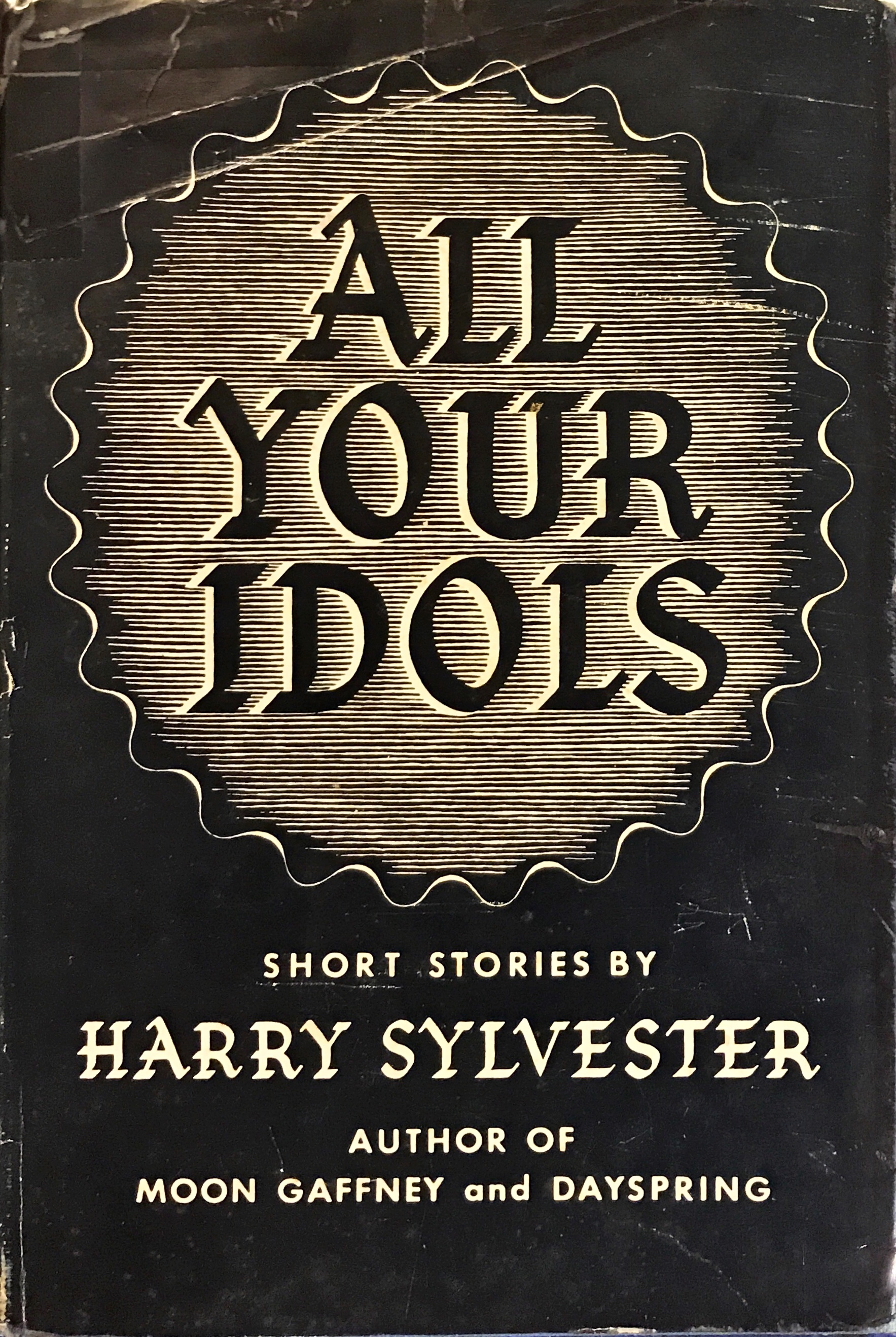
The front cover of All Your Idols published in 1948 by Henry Holt and Co., with dust jacket illustration.

== Short stories ==
Sylvester estimated that he wrote "about 150 short stories" between 1930 and 1955. Over the years, some of his short stories have continued to have life through edited collections such as Prose for Senior Students (1960), 20 Grand: Great American Short Stories (1967), Runner's Literary Companion (1994), and Classic Boxing Stories (2013).

Collected Short Stories

- All Your Idols (1948), a collection arranged by Sylvester containing 14 previously published stories with their original titles restored

Selected Individual Short Stories

- “Four Great Years,” Columbia (November 1930)
- “This Life-guard Business,” Columbia (August 1931)
- “Priest and Scientist,” Columbia (January 1932)
- “Blaze of Glory,” Cosmopolitan (August 1932)
- “Sweet and Lovely,” Columbia (October 1932)
- “Indifferent Man,” Cosmopolitan (December 1932)
- “Post-Mortem,” Columbia (August 1933)
- “Underwater,” Cosmopolitan (September 1933)
- “A Boxer: Old,” Whit Burnett’s Story Magazine (January 1934)
- “The Golden Shirt,” Columbia (February 1934)
- “This Thing the Spirit,” Story Magazine (December 1934)
- “The Old College Try,” Columbia (May 1935)
- “We Go to Church,” America (June 1935)
- “Discobolus,” Baltimore Sun (June 1935)
- “Man Going Home,” Pictorial Review (July 1935)
- “A Good Game Boy,” Columbia (August 1935)
- “Pro,” Baltimore Sun (December 1935)
- “Dark Christmas,” America (December 1935)
- “Pattern,” Baltimore Sun (March 1936)
- “Some Like Them Soft,” Pictorial Review (April 1936)
- “Gallantry,” Columbia (August 1936)
- “The Swede,” Scribner’s (October 1936)
- “Trial by Ice,” American Magazine (January 1937)
- “I Won’t Do No Dive,” Esquire (July 1937)
- “No Bitter Memory,” Pictorial Review combined with Delineator (July 1937)
- “The Beautiful, the Brave,” Columbia (October 1937)
- “The Shark and the Yankee,” Esquire (November 1937)
- “Passing Brave,” Collier’s (December 1937)
- “Storm Over Water,” American Magazine (February 1938)
- “This Running Is No Fun,” Columbia (February 1938)
- “The Place of Bulls,” Collier’s (March 1938)
- “The Crazy Guy,” Esquire (April 1938)
- “Teacher is Wonderful,” Commonweal (April 1938)
- “No Support,” Baltimore Sun (July 1938)
- “Orders Disobeyed,” Collier’s (November 1938)
- “Beautifully and Bravely,” Collier’s (February 1939)
- “Doctor Comes of Age,” Esquire (April 1939)
- “Eight-Oared Crew,” Collier’s (June 1939)
- "Fable of the Irishman with the Long Nose," The Voice (August 1939)
- “Run, Captain, Run,” Argosy (August 1939)
- “The Heart and the Hands,” Collier’s (January 1940)
- “Edge of Dark,” American Magazine (April 1940)
- “Her Picture in the Paper,” Columbia (April 1940)
- “The Wind Under Their Wings,” Liberty Magazine (May 1940)
- “Return of the Hero,” Collier’s (November 1940)
- “Last Race,” Collier’s (January 1941)
- “The Captain of the Team,” Collier’s (November 1941)
- “Horses at Broken Bow,” Saturday Evening Post (May 1942)
- “Battle in the West,” Collier’s (July 1942)
- “The Wind Blows in a Circle,” Collier’s (December 1942)
- “The Face of Danger,” Collier’s (January 1943)
- “The Return of Grande Williams,” Collier's (April 1943)
- “The Halls of Montezuma,” Collier’s (October 1943)
- “Lifeboat,” Collier's (November 1943) [with Alfred Hitchcock]
- “Going to Run All Night,” Collier’s (March 1944)
- “A Sense of Participation,” Good Housekeeping (October 1944)
- “Home is the Sailor,” Collier’s (March 1945)
- “Nothing Ever Bothers Them,” The Sign (November 1945)
- “The Head of An Indian,” American Magazine (March 1946)
- “Journey South,” Rocky Mountain Review (Spring 1946)
- “All Your Idols,” Commonweal (March 1947)
- “To the Victors,” Collier's (March 1947)
- “Double or Nothing,” Collier’s (November 1948)
- “O Morning Stars Together,” Commonweal (January 1949)
- “Owl, He Crow for Midnight” Collier's (November 1949)
- “This Summer Land,” Women’s Home Companion (February 1950)
- “A Thousand Summers,” Collier’s (September 1950)
- “Hero’s Holiday,” Collier’s (March 1951)
- “The Draw at Arroyo Blanco,” Collier’s (October 1952)
- “Blood in Their Eyes,” Argosy (January 1953)
- “Tin Star Posse,” Collier's (February 1955)

== Awards ==
- O. Henry Prize, "A Boxer: Old" (1934)
- O. Henry Prize, "The Crazy Guy" (1939)
- O. Henry Prize, "Beautifully and Bravely" (1940)
