= Ed Folsom =

American literary scholar (born 1947)

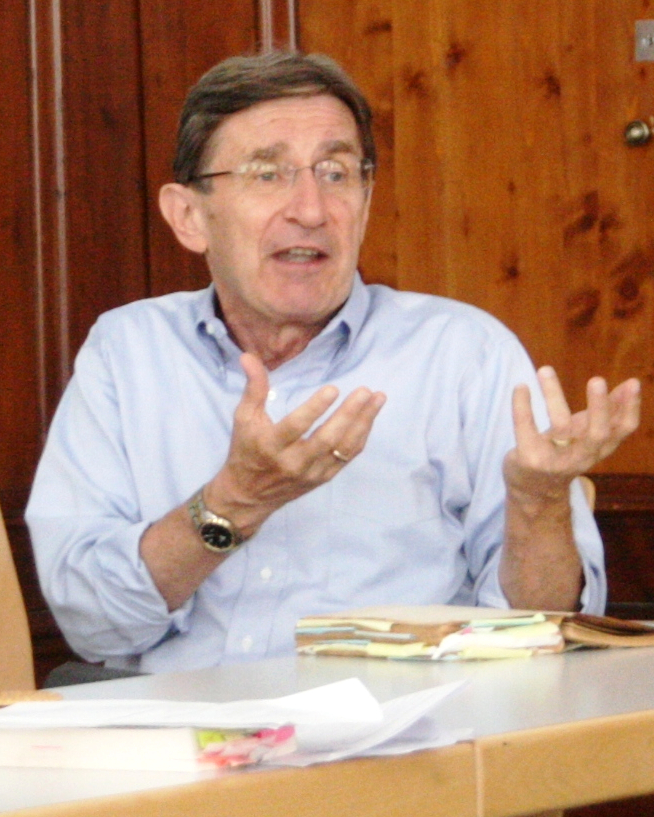
- Folsom at Whitman Week in Bamberg, Germany, July 2014
- Born: Lowell Edwin Folsom; September 30, 1947 (age 79); Pittsburgh, Pennsylvania, U.S.
- Awards: Guggenheim Fellowship (2007–2008); Choice Outstanding Academic Book Award (×3); Independent Publisher Book Award; Honorary doctorate, TU Dortmund (2023)

Academic background
- Education: Ohio Wesleyan University (BA); University of Rochester (MA, 1972; PhD, 1976)

Academic work
- Discipline: American literature
- Sub-discipline: Whitman studies
- Institutions: University of Iowa (Roy J. Carver Professor Emeritus)
- Notable works: Walt Whitman's Native Representations (1994); Co-director, Walt Whitman Archive (since 1995)
- Website: english.uiowa.edu/people/ed-folsom

Ed Folsom (born 1947) is the Roy J. Carver Professor Emeritus of English at the University of Iowa. He is an American literary critic, textual scholar, and digital humanist, and considered one of the world's leading experts on the poet Walt Whitman. Folsom is the author or editor of twelve books, most of which focus on Whitman and Leaves of Grass, though he has also written on Emily Dickinson, Allen Ginsberg, Langston Hughes, Herman Melville, W. S. Merwin, and others. Folsom's scholarship has been recognized with a Guggenheim Fellowship (2007–2008), three Choice Outstanding Academic Book awards, and an Independent Publisher Book Award. Folsom has lectured in over twelve countries and, in 2023, was awarded an honorary doctorate from Technical University of Dortmund.

== Early life and education ==
Folsom was born in Pittsburgh on September 30, 1947, and was raised in various towns across the industrial Midwest, including Chicago, Columbus, and Cleveland, where he went to high school. There, Folsom had his first impactful encounter with Whitman, when his English teacher announced the Assassination of John F. Kennedy with a reading of the poet's elegy to Abraham Lincoln, "When Lilacs Last in the Dooryard Bloom'd." In 1969, Folsom graduated magna cum laude from Ohio Wesleyan University. After teaching high school English at Lancaster High School (Ohio) for a year, he began his graduate studies in English and American Literature at the University of Rochester. He earned his Ph.D. there in 1976 with a thesis on "America, the Metaphor: Place as Person as Poem as Poet." His advisor was William H. Rueckert, one of the foundational figures of Ecocriticism.

== Teaching career ==
Following a short stint as a Visiting Assistant Professor at State University of New York at Geneseo (1975–1976), Folsom taught American literature for nearly fifty years at the University of Iowa (1976–2022), where he won numerous teaching and mentorship awards. Originally hired as a twentieth-century scholar, he soon became an expert on nineteenth-century literature, specifically Emily Dickinson and Walt Whitman. From 1997 to 2002 he served as F. Wendell Miller Distinguished Professor of English before being named Roy J. Carver Professor of English in 2002. In 1996, Folsom taught as a Senior Fulbright Professor at Technical University of Dortmund in Germany. He returned to the country as a Visiting Professor in 2022, teaching at the University of Bamberg.

The incorporation of digital tools into pedagogy was a key concern for Folsom. In 1998, he was one of the scholars collaborating on the U.S. Department of Education-funded project The Classroom Electric which sought to bring "images of original manuscripts, rare photographs, notebooks, scrapbooks, letters, and maps" relating to Whitman and Dickinson in conversation with "cutting-edge scholarship" to create an educational website for teachers and students. "As we navigate the new electronic Web," he wrote in a reflection on the effort, "we might imagine ourselves as hypertextual poets, creating new patterns of understanding and meaning, weaving the Web, or we might feel ourselves as trapped prey, enwebbed in a hopelessly vast and complex maze of information." In 2012, Folsom and Christopher Merrill launched a collaboration between the International Writing Program at the University of Iowa and the Walt Whitman Archive called WhitmanWeb, which initially focused on a translation of "Song of Myself" into nine languages. This was followed by two massive open online courses (2014, 2016), co-taught by Merrill and Folsom and attended by thousands of Whitman readers from around the world. Shortly before the end of his teaching career, Folsom directed the undergraduate creative writing track at Iowa.

Folsom's Whitman Seminars, which he began offering at the University of Iowa in the 1980s, have been described as "legendary" by scholars of the poet and had a lasting impact on future generations of academics. Among Folsom's doctoral advisees were Sherry Ceniza, Gregory Eiselein, Tom Gannon, and Ted Genoways.

Folsom retired and was granted Emeritus status in 2022.

== Writings and influence ==
=== Whitman studies ===
Folsom was instrumental in the formation of Whitman studies as a field of professional academic inquiry. With William White, he founded the current journal of record for Whitman studies, the Walt Whitman Quarterly Review in 1983 (as a follow-up publication to the Walt Whitman Review), founded the Whitman Studies Association (1989), and co-founded the Walt Whitman Archive (1995), one of the longest-running digital editorial projects in the United States. For the Review, Folsom maintains a comprehensive, annotated bibliography of global Whitman scholarship, which is also available on the Whitman Archive. For University of Iowa Press, he edits the long-running Iowa Whitman series. He also serves as an Honorary Trustee for the Walt Whitman Birthplace State Historic Site.

Folsom hosted a number of major conferences on Whitman, including the NEH-funded "Centennial Conference" (1992) in Iowa City, attended by over 150 Whitman scholars, the "Whitman 2000" conference in Beijing (the first of its kind), and "Whitman Making Books / Books Making Whitman," again at the University of Iowa, in 2005. Each conference resulted in a scholarly book.

Folsom is one of the founding members of the Transatlantic Whitman Week, an international meeting and symposium that unites Whitman scholars and graduate students from around the world. Since 2007, the meeting has been held in places such as Germany, France, Brazil, and Poland.

=== Literary criticism ===
Folsom is a textual and biographical critic, whose research incorporates elements of close reading and contextual historical criticism. His work on Whitman in relation to book studies led to a reconsideration of how scholars treat the textual history of Leaves of Grass, with Folsom making a strong case for viewing each of the six major editions as distinct artistic expressions, not merely revisions toward a singular poetic statement. Folsom's research into the first and third editions (1855, 1860) stands out in particular. After conducting a multi-year census of all the textual variants of the 1855 edition, for instance, he concluded that "there are far more variations from copy to copy than have been previously known" and demonstrated that the notorious missing final period of "Song of Myself" had been a printing mishap. Among his better known works are an essay revealing hidden spermatic designs Whitman employed in the 1860 edition of Leaves, his attribution of the only surviving Whitman sound recording, and his identification of a possible late-life series of nude photographs of the poet. Folsom's over fifty published academic essays range widely and cover Whitman's engagement with such themes as baseball, race and Reconstruction, mathematics, Native Americans, and photography, as well as Whitman's influence on other poets.

Folsom maintained a close relationship with the Iowa Writers' Workshop, including the International Writing Program, and formed academic friendships with authors who informed his teaching and research, such as Marvin Bell, Robert Creeley, Ed Dorn, Robert Duncan, James Galvin, Allen Ginsberg, Jorie Graham, Robert Hass, Brenda Hillman, Donald Justice, Galway Kinnell, Gerald Stern, and Yusef Komunyakaa.

=== Walt Whitman Archive ===
Together with Kenneth M. Price and Charles Green, Folsom began working on e-text versions of Leaves of Grass in the 1990s. Originally a CD-Rom-based project, the Walt Whitman Archive has since grown into an expansive, free-to-use (and partially open access) online archive. Folsom directed seven major grants from the National Endowment for the Humanities that contributed to this growth (1985, 1990–1994, 2000–2003, 2003–2005, 2008–2011, 2013–2016, 2016–2020). Today, the Whitman Archive makes available scholarly editions not only of all of Whitman's major books but also of his photographs, newspaper poetry, scribal documents, two-way correspondence, and a significant percentage of his journalism. It also hosts a biography of the poet written by Folsom and Price. The Whitman Archive has been the subject of a special issue forum in PMLA and was awarded the C.F.W. Coker Award by the Society of American Archivists (2006) and the Richard J. Finneran Award from the Society for Textual Scholarship (2021). "The Whitman Archive has the greatest promise for carrying on the scholarship I do on Whitman out into the general public," Folsom said in 2009. He remains one of its co-directors, alongside Price and Matt Cohen.

=== Media appearances ===
Throughout his career, Folsom appeared as a Whitman expert in a variety of media formats, including for PBS's American Experience (Walt Whitman), various NPR programs like Talk of the Nation, On the Media, and Morning Edition, as well as CBS Sunday Morning and the New York Times.

== Personal life ==
Folsom is married to Pat Folsom, a retired academic advisor at the University of Iowa. The Pat Folsom Excellence in Academic Advising Award is named after her. Together, they have a son.

== Selected bibliography ==
Selected books (as author or editor)

- Folsom, Ed. Walt Whitman's Native Representations. Cambridge: Cambridge University Press, 1994. ISBN 978-0521453578.
- Perlman, Jim, Ed Folsom, and Dan Campion, eds. Walt Whitman: The Measure of His Song. Rev. ed. Duluth, MN: Holy Cow! Press, 1998.
- Folsom, Ed, ed. Whitman East and West: New Contexts for Reading Walt Whitman. Iowa City: University of Iowa Press, 2002.
- Folsom, Ed. Whitman Making Books/Books Making Whitman: A Catalog and Commentary. Iowa City: Obermann Center for Advanced Studies, University of Iowa, 2005. ISBN 0874141532.
- Folsom, Ed, and Christopher Merrill. Song of Myself: With a Complete Commentary. Iowa City: University of Iowa Press, 2016.

Selected articles and chapters

- Folsom, L. Edwin. "'The Souls That Snow': Winter in the Poetry of Emily Dickinson." American Literature, vol. 47, no. 3, Nov. 1975, pp. 361–376.
- Folsom, Ed. "Walt Whitman's 'Calamus' Photographs." In Breaking Bounds: Whitman and American Cultural Studies, edited by Betsy Erkkila and Jay Grossman, 193–219. New York: Oxford University Press, 1996.
- Folsom, Ed. "'What a Filthy Presidentiad!': Clinton's Whitman, Bush's Whitman, and Whitman's America." Virginia Quarterly Review, vol. 81, no. 2, Spring 2005, pp. 96–113.
- Folsom, Ed. "The Census of the 1855 Leaves of Grass: A Preliminary Report." Walt Whitman Quarterly Review 24, no. 2 (Fall 2006): 71–84.
- Folsom, Ed. "'A spirt of my own seminal wet': Spermatoid Design in Walt Whitman's 1860 Leaves of Grass." Huntington Library Quarterly 73, no. 4 (2010): 585–600.
- Folsom, Ed. "'That towering bulge of pure white': Whitman, Melville, the Capitol Dome, and Black America." Leviathan 16, no. 1 (March 2014): 87–120.
- Folsom, Ed. "Whitman Left to His Own Devices." In The Oxford Handbook of Walt Whitman, edited by Kenneth M. Price and Stefan Schöberlein, 9–27. Oxford: Oxford University Press, 2024.
