= William Blake Archive =

Digital humanities project first created in 1994

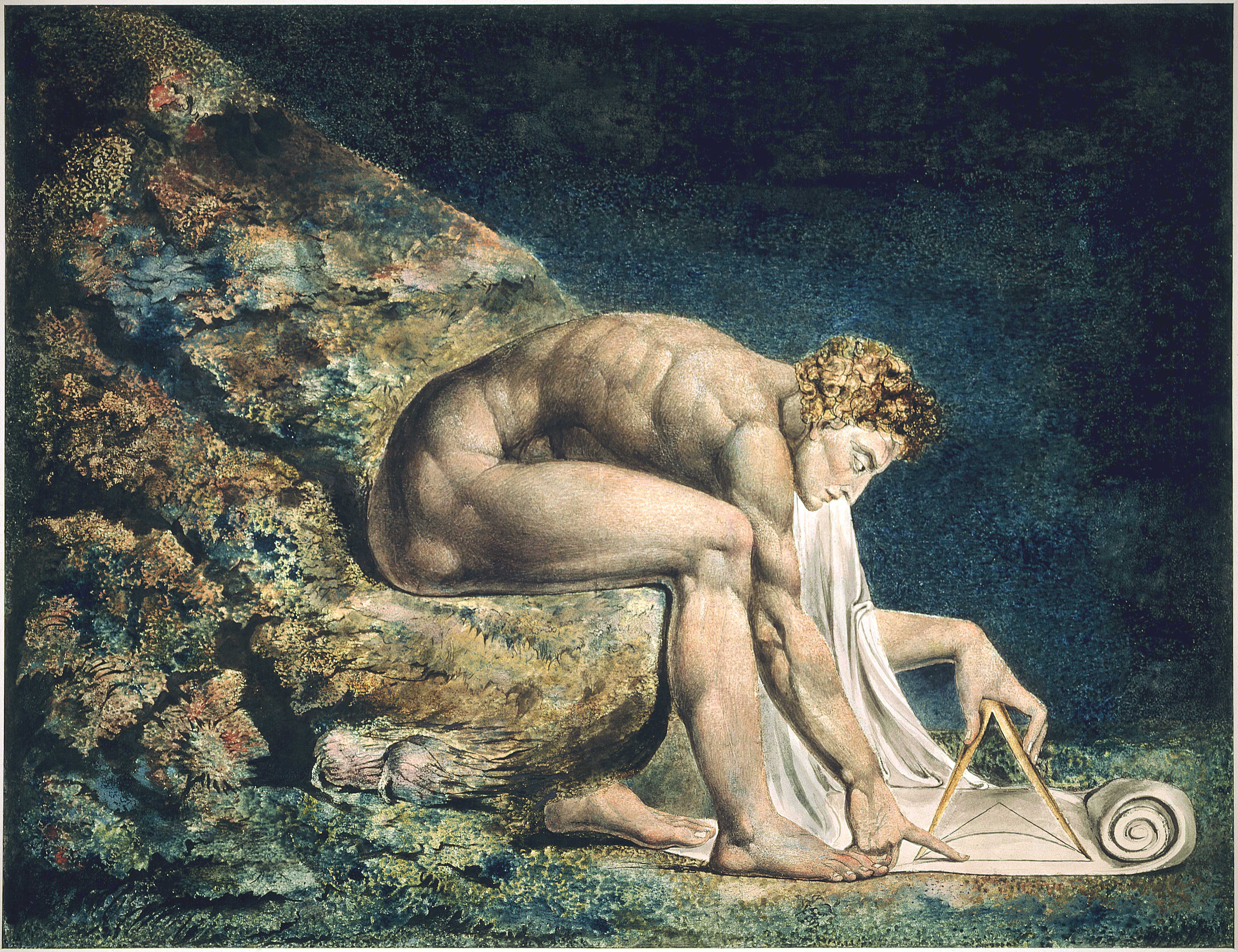
- William Blake's Newton (1795).
- Website type: Digital humanities / digital archive
- Available in: English
- Editors: Robert N. Essick, Joseph Viscomi (Morris Eaves, editor 1994–2024)
- Website: blakearchive.org
- Launched: 1996; 30 years ago
- Current status: Active

The William Blake Archive is a digital humanities project and visual archive begun in 1994 and first launched in 1996. The project is supported by the University of North Carolina at Chapel Hill and the University of Rochester. The Archive has been sponsored by the Library of Congress and supported over the years by grants and gifts from the National Endowment for the Humanities, the Getty Grant Program, and the Paul Mellon Centre for Studies in British Art.

The Archive is edited by Robert N. Essick (University of California, Riverside) and Joseph Viscomi (University of North Carolina at Chapel Hill). Morris Eaves (University of Rochester), a founding editor of the Archive, served in that role until his death in 2024.

== Purpose ==
Inspired by its fellow "first-generation digital humanities project" the Rossetti Archive, the Archive provides digital reproductions of the various works of William Blake, a prominent Romantic-period poet, artist, and engraver, alongside annotation, commentary and scholarly materials related to Blake. Founding editor Eaves also edited the journal Blake/An Illustrated Quarterly, archival issues of which (from its inception in 1968 to 2015) are available freely on the Blake Archive.

When publishing his poetry, William Blake would create print block illustrations for his book, print his books in black and white and then hand paint the illustrations within the prints. Furthermore, many of his works underwent multiple editions of printing, each with unique variations in the prints used to illustrate the poems and the poems themselves. Because of this complex process and the quality of his art, his art and poetry has been highly sought by collectors and scholars. The Blake Archive provides high quality digital copies of the facsimiles, providing scholars and students an opportunity to see the complexity of his published works often not available by viewing the scholarly print editions.

== Critical assessment ==
The Blake Archive has been peer reviewed by the Modern Language Association in 2005 and the Multimedia Educational Tools for Learning and Online Teaching (MERLOT) process in 2010. MERLOT highly recommended the use of the tool for teaching, praising the access to primary sources it provides; however, they also noted the need for educators to create instructional materials on how to use the site and the ease by which someone could get lost. A 2017 review in the academic journal RIDE: A Review Journal for Digital Editions and Resources praised the Archive's object-centered editorial approach, highlighting how it "succeeds as a scholarly digital edition" while preserving the material individuality of Blake's art. Scholars have also written a number of educational case studies on how to use the Archive. (Note: See for example Josephine A. McQuail "Using the William Blake Archive in Teaching Poetry" from MLA 2000 in Washington, D.C. or Daniel Cook "Teaching Romanticism VI: William Blake" on the Romantic Textualities blog.)

== History ==
While working on two printed Blake volumes for the Blake Trust, Tate Gallery, and Princeton University Press in the early 1990s, scholars Morris Eaves, Robert N. Essick, and Joseph Viscomi concluded that even a high-quality print edition could not fully represent Blake's artistry, and began to consider a digital alternative. At the "urging of Jerome McGann," the three visited the Institute for Advanced Technology in the Humanities at the University of Virginia in the summer of 1993 to see McGann's Rossetti Archive and to meet with IATH staff, including its new director, John Unsworth, to plan what would ultimately become the Blake Archive. After months of preparation and two years of development at Virginia, the site's first content went live in 1996. In 2006 the Archive migrated to servers at the University of North Carolina at Chapel Hill while Eaves assembled a team of graduate students at the University of Rochester to help edit Blake's manuscripts. In 2003 the Archive became the first electronic collection to receive the Modern Language Association's Prize for a Distinguished Scholarly Edition, and in 2005 it became the first digital project to receive the "Approved Edition" seal from the MLA's Committee on Scholarly Editions. The Archive underwent what reviewers lauded as a "complete and transformative redesign," relaunched on December 12, 2016, which retained all prior content while modernizing navigation. The Blake Archive's efforts are ongoing.
