= Walt Whitman Quarterly Review =

American academic journal

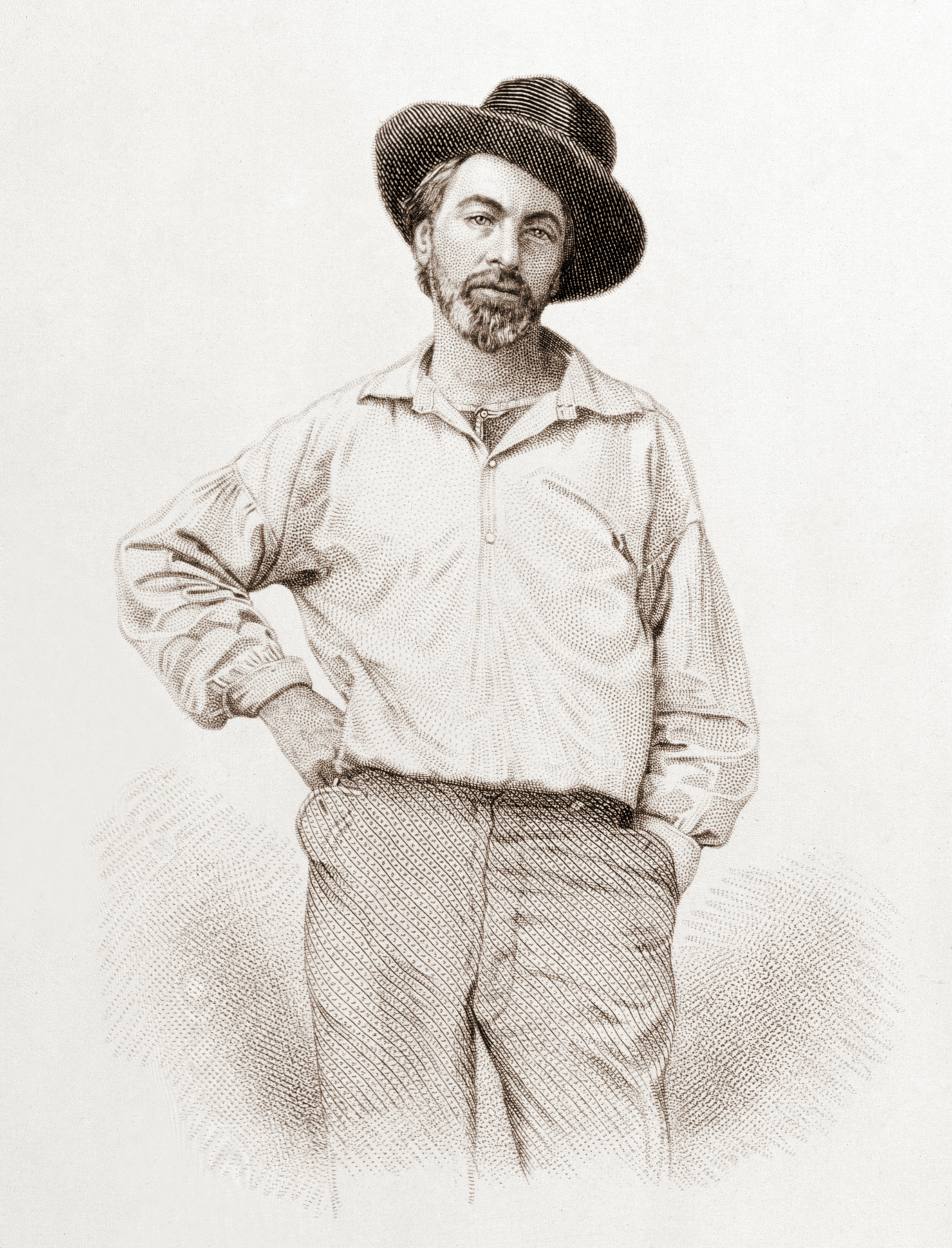
- 1855 Whitman daguerreotype, used on cover of print edition of WWQR
- Discipline: American literature, Walt Whitman studies
- Language: English
- Edited by: Ed Folsom (1983–present), Stephanie M. Blalock (2026–present), Stefan Schöberlein (2026–present)

Publication details
- History: 1983–present
- Publisher: University of Iowa (United States)
- Frequency: quarterly
- Open access: Yes (since vol. 33, no. 1, 2015)

Standard abbreviations
- ISO 4: Walt Whitman Q. Rev.

Indexing
- ISSN: 0737-0679 (print); 2153-3695 (web)
- OCLC no.: 297314389

Links
- Journal homepage

The Walt Whitman Quarterly Review (WWQR) is an academic journal devoted to the study of American poet Walt Whitman, published quarterly by the University of Iowa. It is the official journal of the Whitman Studies Association, affiliated with the American Literature Association. The journal is indexed in the Arts and Humanities Citation Index and Scopus, and is included in the MLA International Bibliography.

WWQR publishes not only academic essays but also archival discoveries. It made international headlines with the publication of newly discovered, book-length Whitman prose in 2016 and 2017. Each issue of the journal also includes a current bibliography of Whitman scholarship by editor Ed Folsom (which is archived on the Walt Whitman Archive).

== History ==
The Walt Whitman Quarterly Review succeeded the Walt Whitman Review (founded 1955) in 1983, when that journal's publisher Wayne State University withdrew its support.

=== Walt Whitman Review ===
The Walt Whitman Review was an American academic journal focused on Whitman that was published from 1955 to 1982. The journal was founded at New York University in 1955 as the Walt Whitman Newsletter. In 1959, it began to be published quarterly by Wayne State University Press under the title Walt Whitman Review, edited by William White and collector Charles E. Feinberg.

Charles Feinberg's correspondence and production files relating to the journal are held in the Charles E. Feinberg Collection of Walt Whitman papers at the Library of Congress.

In 1982, it ended publication. It was recast the following year as the Walt Whitman Quarterly Review at the University of Iowa.

=== Walt Whitman Quarterly Review ===
The new iteration of the Review was established at the University of Iowa with a different name reflecting its publication schedule. William White and Ed Folsom were the founding editors of WWQR until White retired in 1989. Folsom has continued to serve as editor, Stephanie M. Blalock and Stefan Schöberlein joining him as co-editors in 2026. Originally a subscription-based print journal, WWQR became an open-access, online-only publication in 2015.

== See also ==
- Walt Whitman Archive
