= Morris Eaves =

American literary scholar (born 1944)

- Born: Morris Emory Eaves; May 12, 1944; West Monroe, Louisiana, U.S.
- Died: February 25, 2024 (aged 79); Rochester, New York
- Awards: Guggenheim Fellowship (1997); MLA Prize for a Distinguished Scholarly Edition (2003/2004), for the William Blake Archive

Academic background
- Education: Tulane University (PhD, 1972)

Academic work
- Discipline: British literature
- Sub-discipline: Romanticism; William Blake studies; digital humanities
- Institutions: University of New Mexico (1970–1986); University of Rochester (1986–2024; English Department chair, 1988–1996)
- Notable works: William Blake's Theory of Art (1982); The Cambridge Companion to William Blake (ed., 2003); Co-founder, William Blake Archive (1996–2024)
- Website: www.sas.rochester.edu/eng/people/morris-eaves.html

Morris Eaves (1944–2024) was an American scholar of British literature and Digital Humanities, and Richard L. Turner Professor of the Humanities, at the University of Rochester, where he taught from 1986 until his death in 2024. Eaves is considered "one of the most influential Blake scholars in the post-war period." He helped create the William Blake Archive in the early 1990s, which he co-directed from its launch in 1996 to his death. The Archive was awarded the Distinguished Scholarly Edition prize of the Modern Language Association in 2004. This project made the distinctive interactions between image, text, and color in Blake's prints accessible to scholars around the world; he also edited the journal Blake/An Illustrated Quarterly for many years. Eaves died on February 25, 2024, at the age of 79.

== Career ==
Eaves earned a B.A. summa cum laude from Long Island University in 1966 and a Ph.D. in English from Tulane University in 1972. In 1970, he began teaching at the University of New Mexico where he would ultimately be named Presidential Professor of English in 1985 In 1986, Eaves joined the University of Rochester as professor of English, later becoming Richard L. Turner Professor of Humanities. He chaired the Department of English from 1988 to 1996 and directed the university's Andrew W. Mellon Graduate Program in Digital Humanities from 2013 to 2022.

Eaves co-edited the journal Blake/An Illustrated Quarterly with Morton D. Paley beginning in 1970, and in 1994 co-founded the William Blake Archive with Robert N. Essick and Joseph Viscomi, serving as its co-editor until his death.

His research was supported by grants and fellowships from the Getty Grant Program, the National Endowment for the Humanities, the Guggenheim Foundation, the National Humanities Center, and the Andrew W. Mellon Foundation, which funded the graduate digital-humanities training program he directed at Rochester.

== Selected publications ==
=== Books ===
- Eaves, Morris (1982). William Blake's Theory of Art. Princeton, NJ: Princeton University Press. ISBN 0691003408.
- Eaves, Morris (1992). The Counter-Arts Conspiracy: Art and Industry in the Age of Blake. Ithaca, NY: Cornell University Press. ISBN 9780801424892.

=== Edited volumes ===
- Eaves, Morris, ed. (Fall 1982). "Romantic Texts, Romantic Times: Homage to David V. Erdman". Studies in Romanticism. 21 (3).
- Eaves, Morris; Fischer, Michael, eds. (1986). Romanticism and Contemporary Criticism. Ithaca, NY: Cornell University Press. ISBN 9780801844607.
- Eaves, Morris; Essick, Robert N.; Viscomi, Joseph, eds. (1993). William Blake: The Early Illuminated Books. London and Princeton, NJ: William Blake Trust/Tate Gallery and Princeton University Press. ISBN 0691001472.
- Eaves, Morris, ed. (2003) [2002]. The Cambridge Companion to William Blake. Cambridge: Cambridge University Press. ISBN 978-0521786775.

=== Selected articles and chapters ===
- Eaves, Morris (1977). "Blake and the Artistic Machine: An Essay in Decorum and Technology". PMLA. 92 (5): 903–927. doi:10.2307/461845.
- Eaves, Morris (1980). "Romantic Expressive Theory and Blake's Idea of the Audience". PMLA. 95 (5): 784–801. doi:10.2307/461757.
- Eaves, Morris (1995). "On Blakes We Want and Blakes We Don't". Huntington Library Quarterly. 58 (3/4): 413–439. doi:10.2307/3817576.
- Eaves, Morris; Essick, Robert N.; Viscomi, Joseph; Kirschenbaum, Matthew G. (1999). "Standards, Methods, and Objectives in the William Blake Archive: A Response". The Wordsworth Circle. 30 (3): 135–144. doi:10.1086/TWC24044108.
- Eaves, Morris (2009). "Picture Problems: X-editing Images, 1992–2010". Digital Humanities Quarterly. 3 (3). doi:10.63744/893dadfgvkx9.
- Eaves, Morris (Autumn 2017). "The Editorial Void: Notes toward a Study of Oblivion". Huntington Library Quarterly. 80 (3): 517–538. doi:10.1353/hlq.2017.0029.
