= Richard T. Sullivan =

American novelist

Richard T. Sullivan (died 1981) was a novelist, short-story writer, and member of the faculty of the University of Notre Dame. His novels and short story collections include The World of Idella May, The Three Kings, Summer After Summer, The Dark Continent, and First Citizen. He wrote numerous book reviews for The New York Times and the Chicago Tribune. He was a popular teacher at Notre Dame.

Sullivan taught English from 1936 to 1974 and published six novels, dozens of short stories, as well as various other efforts. Though published by major houses, he never gained recognition as a mainstream writer, but was well known as a regional writer and a Catholic spokesman.

Sullivan was also friends with many other Catholic authors, such as Harry Sylvester. The two men corresponded often during the 1950s, 60s, and 70s.

Mr. Sullivan also wrote a book entitled Notre Dame: The Story of a Great American University, published by Holt in 1951. This book is a personal look at community life at Notre Dame.

The University of Notre Dame's Creative Writing Program named an award for short fiction after him. The Richard Sullivan Prize for short fiction has been awarded biennially since 1996.

== Bibliography ==
- Summer After Summer, 1942
- The Dark Continent, 1943
- The World of Idella May, 1946
- First Citizen, 1948
- The Fresh and Open Sky and Other Stories, 1950
- Notre Dame, 1951
- The Three Kings, 1959
