= Walt Whitman Archive =

Digital literary archive

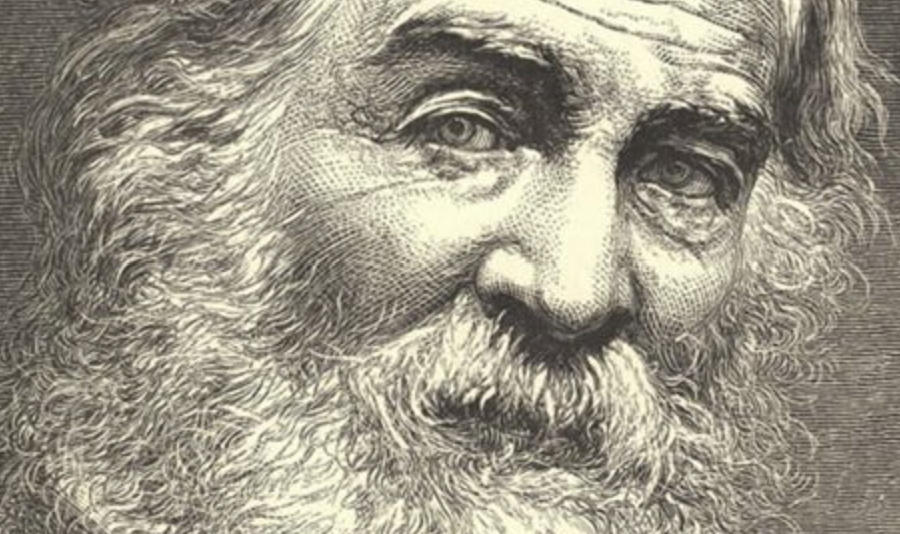
- 1871 engraving used on Whitman Archive front page
- Website type: Digital humanities / scholarly digital edition
- Available in: English
- Owners: Center for Digital Research in the Humanities, University of Nebraska–Lincoln
- Creators: Ed Folsom, Kenneth M. Price
- Editors: Ed Folsom, Kenneth M. Price, Matt Cohen
- Website: whitmanarchive.org
- Commercial: No
- Registration: Not required
- Launched: 1995; 31 years ago
- Current status: Active

The Walt Whitman Archive is a digital scholarly archive devoted to the work of American poet Walt Whitman (1819–1892). Launched in 1995 by Ed Folsom and Kenneth M. Price, it is considered one of the "major first-generation digital humanities archives," alongside projects like the Rossetti Archive (which closed in 2008) and the William Blake Archive. The Whitman Archive was originally hosted by the Institute for Advanced Technology in the Humanities at the University of Virginia (then directed by Daniel Pitti) before moving to the Center for Digital Research in the Humanities at the University of Nebraska–Lincoln in 2007. Since 1995, it has been directed by Folsom and Price, with Matt Cohen joining its leadership in 2022.

The Whitman Archive provides page images and searchable text of all lifetime editions of Leaves of Grass, Whitman's correspondence, newspaper poetry, prose, scribal documents, and selections from translations and international editions as well as from Whitman's notebooks, journalism, and literary manuscripts (with a long-term goal of digitizing all known items). Also included is a comprehensive secondary bibliography, a biography, a copy of a wax-cylinder recording believed to be of Whitman's voice, and copies of all extant photographs of the poet.

== History ==
Since its inception in 1995, the Whitman Archive has steadily expanded with the help of near-continuous federal grant support (see #Grants and awards). Following its digital editions of Whitman's major books, the Whitman Archive began systematically editing Whitman's poetry manuscripts in 2000, extending the effort to his prose manuscripts between 2012 and 2015 to create the "Integrated Catalog of Whitman's Literary Manuscripts." In 2008, it began editing Whitman's Civil War writings—his notebooks, journalism, and annotated "Blue Book" copy of Leaves of Grass—and started digitizing his letters, which launched a long-running effort to edit his complete two-way correspondence that concluded in 2023 with more than 6,000 published letters.

The 2010s brought several major additions: a collection of translations published with the Obermann Center for Advanced Studies (2012), Kenneth M. Price's discovery of nearly 3,000 Whitman manuscripts at the National Archives (2013), most of Whitman's pre-1855 fiction (including his temperance novel Franklin Evans), and an edition of the previously unknown 1858 self-help series Manly Health and Training in 2017. A variorum edition of the 1855 Leaves of Grass, begun around 2017, was published in July 2020. Since then, the Archive has published further caches of Whitman's journalism and manuscripts, including, in 2024, almost 800 articles he wrote for the Brooklyn Daily Times.

== Critical assessment ==
Reviewing the website for the Journal of American History, Michael Robertson wrote that "[t]he Walt Whitman Archive, arguably the most ambitious scholarly single-author site on the Internet, is an essential resource for anyone teaching and writing about nineteenth-century America." For The Chronicle of Higher Education, William Pannapacker (writing as Thomas H. Benton) called the Whitman Archive "surely the most important editorial undertaking on Whitman since the publication of the 'deathbed edition' of Leaves of Grass in 1892." The Library of Congress points to the Whitman Archive as a transcription resource for its own Whitman manuscript holdings.

In 2007, the Whitman Archive was the subject of a scholarly forum in a special issue of PMLA. In it, Meredith McGill described herself as "a long-term, devoted user" of the Whitman Archive who could not imagine studying or teaching nineteenth-century American literature without it, though she worried about its then-bias for Leaves of Grass over Whitman's prose. Jonathan Freedman also praised the Whitman Archive's "easy access to insights into the texts and variants that compose the poet's massive corpus" and its "masterly biographical sketch" (written by Folsom and Price), while noting that its curators linked extensively to Whitman-era criticism but included little current commentary, tending, in his view, to institutionalize certain versions of Whitman while effacing others. Likewise, Jerome McGann warned that the digital enthusiasm of the Whitman Archive signaled, at times, "a loose way of thinking about our paper-based inheritance."

== Grants and awards ==
- The Whitman Archive has received more than a dozen grants from the National Endowment for the Humanities (NEH), including a "We the People" challenge grant, along with support from the National Historical Publications and Records Commission (NHPRC), the Institute of Museum and Library Services (IMLS), and the U.S. Department of Education.
- In 2006, the Whitman Archive's "Integrated Finding Guide to Whitman's Poetry Manuscripts" received the C.F.W. Coker Award from the Society of American Archivists, given for archival projects that set national standards in descriptive practice.
- In 2021, its "Digital Variorum of the 1855 Leaves of Grass" won the Richard J. Finneran Award from the Society for Textual Scholarship for the best edition or work of editorial theory published in English, the first time the award went to a digital edition rather than a printed book.

== See also ==
- Walt Whitman Quarterly Review
- William Blake Archive
- Digital humanities
