= SNAC =

Online resource for historical records

Social Networks and Archival Context
- Producer: Social Networks and Archival Context (United States)
- History: 2010 to present

Access
- Cost: Free

Coverage
- Disciplines: History
- Format coverage: Finding aids

Links
- Website: snaccooperative.org

Social Networks and Archival Context (SNAC) is an online project for discovering, locating, and using distributed historical records in regard to individual people, families, and organizations.

== The project ==
SNAC is a digital research project that focuses on obtaining records data from various archives, libraries, and museums, so the biographical history of individuals, ancestry, or institutions are incorporated into a single file as opposed to the data being spread throughout different associations, thereby lessening the task of searching various memory organizations to locate the knowledge one seeks. SNAC is used alongside other digital archives to connect related historical records.

One of the project's tools is a radial-graph feature which helps identify a social network of a subject's connections to related historical individuals.

The Institute for Advanced Technology in the Humanities (IATH), University of Virginia, the School of Information, University of California, Berkeley (SI/UCB), and the California Digital Library (CDL), University of California, are the three primary organizations responsible for processing the different elements of the project.

IATH conducts the project and also collects sourcing data from participating institutions, compiles record descriptions from MARC catalogs and EAD finding aids, and turns them into EAC-CPF files.

SI/UCB manages the process of identifying and pairing similar EAC-CPF records to create a unifying file that is searchable.

CDL utilizes the Extensible Text Framework (XTF), which connects the different sources that make up a single EAC-CPF file back to its primary resources.

With a variety of organizations such as the Library of Congress, Smithsonian Institution, and British Library contributing data to the project, it allows the SNAC team to collect a substantial amount of information available on a subject.

== History ==
SNAC was established in 2010, with funding from the National Endowment for the Humanities (NEH) by the National Archives and Records Administration (NARA), California Digital Library (CDL), Institute for Advanced Technology in the Humanities (IATH) at the University of Virginia, and the University of California's Berkeley School of Information. The Andrew W. Mellon Foundation funded the second phase of the project from 2012 to 2014.

With the U.S. National Endowment for Humanities supplying funding, the first half of the project began, enabling the developers of SNAC to explore data extraction from the file creator and develop a model of the record description system. Gathering the contents found within the record creator helps to broaden the knowledge available on the entity biographical history.

With the tremendous progress made in the initial stage, planning for the second half of the project centered on adding more contributors to continue to build a dissimilar of information. To help the SNAC team with the second portion of the project, funding was received from the U.S. Institution for Museum and Library Services while global initiatives were managed by the U.S. National Archives and Records Administration (NARA).

== Data gathering ==
In 2010 the Encoded Archival Context-Corporate Bodies, Persons, and Families (EAC-CPF) was introduced. This new schema allowed each description to live independently from the record creator it was associated with. With the launch of EAC-CPF, the archival field had a universal standard according to which they could use archival authority records differently.

By using a few archival practices, the descriptions of the creator are isolated from the file itself. This permits the gathering of information, building connections between varies entities, and helps to increase access to additional knowledge. Below are the integrated rational elements used to create relationships.

Authority Control – Allows you to locate information related to a subject with multiple or alternate spelling associated with its name through various applications.

Biographical/Historical Resources – Details all events, dates, and places associated with the file creator.

Cooperative Authority Control – Permits libraries to preserve, share, and distribute authority information with other libraries.

Flexible Descriptions – Incorporates a list of multiple institutions associated with a collection connecting the record creator to it.

Integrated Access to Cultural Heritage – Through authority records they act as a unifying folder for all of the descriptions tied to the subject. The authority records help lessen the issue of trying to retain and connect each institution description standard to a family, association, or individual.

Social/Historical Context – Professional and social knowledge linked to the subject help connect to other people, families, and institutions creating an integrated summary of them.

Within a record creator are EAC-CPF files to locate and retrieve them, the SNAC team uses Encoded Archival Description (EAD) finding aids and Machine Readable Catalog (MARC) bibliographic catalogs to gather biographical/historical data. After the information is located, an archival authority record featuring the EAC-CPF knowledge is created.

Once the EAC-CPF record is extracted, the data is compared to other similar files and paired together. To ensure the information is compatible, the SNAC team use Virtual International Authority File (VIAF), Union List of Artist Names (ULAN), and Library of Congress Name Authority File (LCNAF) to establish matches between authority records.

To link the knowledge found in one file to a similar one, names, dates, and other identifying aspects are used to draw a comparison to other related records. Links to where the data originated from are also included in the entity file.

By both national and international institutions providing source data, the amount of information tied to one entity is increased, while linking it to other relevant subjects. Aided by contributions from various organizations, researchers, librarians, archivists, scholars, and non-scholars can locate an array of data available on associations, individuals, and families, thus reducing the amount of time spent searching through an assortment of resources.

== See also ==
- Archival Resource Key (ARK)
- List of academic databases and search engines
