= By-Line: Ernest Hemingway =

Posthumous collection of Ernest Hemingway's journalism

- Hardback cover
- Author: Ernest Hemingway; Edited by William White
- Original title: By-Line: Ernest Hemingway; Selected Articles and Dispatches of Four Decades 1920–1956
- Language: English
- Genre: collection
- Publisher: Charles Scribner's Sons
- Publication date: 1967
- Publication place: United States
- Media type: Print (hardback)
- Pages: 489 pp
- OCLC: 284567
- Dewey Decimal: 818/.5/208
- LC Class: PS3515.E37 A6 1967

By-Line: Ernest Hemingway is a 1967 collection of 77 of the articles that Ernest Hemingway wrote as a journalist between 1920 and 1956. The collection was edited by William White, a professor of English literature and journalism at Wayne State University, and a regular contributor to The Hemingway Review. By-Line: Ernest Hemingway has been translated into fourteen languages and made The New York Times Best Seller list.

== Background ==
Hemingway began his career at 18 as a reporter for The Kansas City Star, and his total journalistic output has been estimated to amount to more than a million words over four decades. The 77 articles published in By-Line: Ernest Hemingway were selected from newsprint and files of magazines, and bring to light Hemingway's inimitable style, his story-telling skills and his personality.

As a reporter and foreign correspondent in Kansas City before World War I, then in Chicago, Toronto, Paris among the expatriates, the Near East, in Europe with the diplomats and statesmen, in Germany and Spain, Hemingway observed people and absorbed places like a sponge: these were later to become subject matter for his short stories and novels. Although he was also a good reporter, showing a grasp of politics, economics, and knew how to dig for information, his craft was that of fiction: his writing shows how he felt about what he saw.

== Description ==
By-Line: Ernest Hemingway has five sections:

- "I. Reporting, 1920–1924" contains 29 selections from Hemingway's 154 articles in the Toronto Daily Star and Star Weekly, representing his first contributions for those papers.
- "II. Esquire, 1933–1936" has 17 selections from Hemingway's 31 monthly letters for Esquire; of the remaining 14, six were fiction and thus outside the scope of William White's collection.
- "III. Spanish Civil War, 1937–1939" features nine of the 28 North American Newspaper Alliance dispatches Hemingway cabled from Europe, plus two of the 14 articles he wrote for Ken, an anti-fascist magazine edited by Arnold Gingrich.
- "IV. World War II" is made up of eight articles written in 1941 for the short-lived, ad-less New York newspaper PM, and six reports he wrote for Collier's in 1944 as the chief of their European Bureau.
- "V. After the Wars, 1949–1956" includes a fishing article from Holiday and a hunting article from True magazine; Hemingway's own account in Look of what happened in his near fatal plane crashes in Africa in 1954; and more about himself and his writing in a later Look article of 1956.

== Writing style ==
The editor, William White, wrote:

Hemingway's literary apprenticeship was served in journalism, and his later work in the field earned him money and sent him to places where he wished to be. Yet his enthusiasm, his compassion, and his imagination made such writing far more than just timely stuff. Some readers will no doubt view the material as rounding out the Hemingway record; others, it is to be hoped, will regard it simply as among the best newspaper and magazine reporting available in our troubled times.

— William White, By-Line: Ernest Hemingway (February 16, 1967)

== Legacy ==
By-Line: Ernest Hemingway was translated into fourteen languages and made The New York Times Best Seller list.

== See also ==
- Dateline: Toronto (1985) – a collection of 172 articles that Hemingway wrote for the Toronto Star between 1920 and 1924.

== Sources ==
=== Books ===
- Hemingway, Ernest (1967). White, William (ed.). By-Line: Ernest Hemingway (hardcover) (1st ed.). New York: Charles Scribner's Sons.

=== Journals, newspapers and magazines ===
- Baker, Carlos (28 May 1967). "His Beat Was The World". The New York Times. Books.
- Folsom, Ed (Spring 1995). "William White, 1910–1995" (text, photo). Walt Whitman Quarterly Review. 12 (4). Iowa City: University of Iowa: 205–208. doi:10.13008/2153-3695.1455. ISSN 2153-3695.

=== Websites ===
- "Books: Hero as Celebrity". Time. 19 May 1967.
