= Institute for Advanced Technology in the Humanities =

Research institute at the University of Virginia

Coordinates: 37°32′12.2″N 78°30′20″W

The Institute for Advanced Technology in the Humanities (IATH) is a research unit of the University of Virginia, USA. Its goal is to explore and develop information technology as a tool for scholarly humanities research. To that end, IATH provides Fellows with consulting, technical support, applications development, and networked publishing facilities. It cultivates partnerships and participates in humanities computing initiatives with libraries, publishers, information technology companies, scholarly organizations, and other groups residing at the intersection of computers and cultural heritage.

IATH's research projects, essays, and documentation are the products of collaboration between humanities and computer science research faculty, computer professionals, student assistants and project managers, and library faculty and staff. In many cases, this work is supported by private or federal funding agencies. In all cases, it is supported by the Fellows’ home departments; the College or School to which those departments belong; the University of Virginia Library; the Vice President for Research and Public Service; the Vice President and Chief Information Officer; the Provost; and the President of the University of Virginia.

== History ==
The Institute for Advanced Technology in the Humanities was established at the University of Virginia in 1992, with a major grant from IBM and a multi-year commitment of support from the University.

IATH's founders are in humanities computing, digital scholarship, and academic administration. Beginning in 1992 a steering committee of scholars, including Edward Ayers, Alan Batson, Jerome McGann, Kendon Stubbs and William Wulf managed IATH. A search committee commissioned by the steering committee carried out the search for the first director of the institute, selecting John Unsworth, who served from September 1, 1993 to 2003. In April 2016, Unsworth was appointed Dean of Libraries and University Librarian, and IATH has been a division of the UVA library since 2022.

IATH has generated over $10.7 million in grant funding and gifts in kind since it began operations. Much of this funding has come from Federal agencies and private foundations, and has gone to support faculty research and teaching across the University.

== See also ==
- Digital History
- Digital Humanities
- SNAC (Social Networks and Archival Context)
- William Blake Archive
- Walt Whitman Archive
