= The Fifth Column and Four Stories of the Spanish Civil War =

Book by Ernest Hemingway

- First edition
- Author: Ernest Hemingway
- Language: English
- Genre: Short story collection and play
- Published: 1969 (Charles Scribner's Sons)
- Publication place: United States

The Fifth Column and Four Stories of the Spanish Civil War is a collection of works by Ernest Hemingway. It contains Hemingway's only full length play, The Fifth Column, which was previously published along with the First Forty-Nine Stories in 1938, along with four stories about Hemingway's experiences during the Spanish Civil War, previously published on magazines between 1938 and 1939.

The four stories are about the Spanish Civil War: The Denunciation, The Butterfly and the Tank, Night Before Battle, and Under The Ridge. Chicote's bar and the Hotel Florida in Madrid are recurrent settings in these stories.
