= Complete Poems =

Book by Ernest Hemingway

- Author: Ernest Hemingway
- Language: English
- Genre: Poetry
- Published: 1979
- Pages: 171
- ISBN: 978-0-803-27259-0

Complete Poems, originally edited and published in 1979 by Nicholas Gerogiannis and revised by him in 1992, is a compilation of all the poetry of Ernest Hemingway. Although Hemingway stopped publishing poetry as his fame grew, he continued to write it until his death in 1961.

Known primarily for novels and short stories, Hemingway was, in his youth, a poet. At a time when he declared the novel was dead (prior to reading close friend Scott Fitzgerald’s The Great Gatsby), Hemingway was composing the short prose pieces that would make him famous. Another friend, T. S. Eliot, told Hemingway that he had real promise as a poet. Hemingway's first book included poetry, but such creative endeavors were abandoned just as Hemingway would abandon his condemnation of the novel.
