= Dateline: Toronto =

Posthumous collection of Ernest Hemingway's journalism

- Hardback cover
- Author: Ernest Hemingway edited by William White
- Original title: Dateline: Toronto; Hemingway's Complete Toronto Star Dispatches 1920–1924
- Language: English
- Genre: collection
- Publisher: Charles Scribner's Sons
- Publication date: 1985
- Publication place: United States
- Media type: Print (Hardback & Paperback)
- Pages: 478 pp
- ISBN: 0-684-18515-6
- OCLC: 12311732
- Dewey Decimal: 814/.54 19
- LC Class: PS3515.E37 A6 1985

Dateline: Toronto is a collection of most of the stories that Ernest Hemingway wrote as a stringer and later staff writer and foreign correspondent for the Toronto Star between 1920 and 1924. The stories were written while he was in his early 20s before he became well-known, and show his development as a writer. The collection was edited by William White, a professor of English literature and journalism at Wayne State University, and a regular contributor to The Hemingway Review.

== Background ==
In 1920, after returning from World War I, Hemingway moved to Toronto where he began freelancing for the Toronto Star Weekly, part of the Toronto Star. For his earliest work, he was paid $5 and eventually hired by the paper. On March 6, 1920, he received his first byline for the Toronto Star Weekly, a story entitled "Taking a Chance for a Free Shave." The story was about a trip to a barber college, where shaves were free, but performed by inexperienced barbers still in training.

Hemingway continued writing features at a rate of about one a week. He stayed in Toronto off and on for two years, earning about $45 a week. During this time he wrote stories on a wide array of subjects—from the benefits of centralized government purchasing ("Buying Commission Would Cut Out Waste", The Toronto Daily Star, April 26, 1920) to a boxing match between Georges Carpentier and Jack Dempsey ("Carpentier Sure to Give Dempsey Fight Worth While", The Toronto Star Weekly, October 30, 1920) to a humorous look at returning World War I veterans ("Lieutenants' Mustaches the Only Permanent Thing We Got Out of War", The Toronto Star Weekly, April 10, 1920.)

In 1921 Hemingway returned to Chicago and wrote dispatches from there. In December 1921, his career changed forever when he went to Europe with his wife and where, as a foreign correspondent, he wrote human-interest stories about post-war conditions. There he made his first experience of bullfighting, the sport that came to be so important in his writings.

After much success as a foreign correspondent, Hemingway returned to Toronto in 1923. But upon his return, he had a bitter falling out with his editor, Harry Hindmarsh, who believed he had been spoiled by his time overseas. Hindmarsh gave him mundane assignments, and Hemingway grew bitter and wrote an angry resignation letter in December 1923. Even his resignation was ignored, and he continued to write sporadically through 1924. In 1924, he published in our time (in lower case) which was the foundation for In Our Time, and decided to leave the Star.

== Description ==
The collection Dateline: Toronto contains 172 articles that Hemingway wrote for the Star. At the time of the collection's publication, in 1985, it was believed to contain the complete works of Ernest Hemingway for the Star.

Determining which stories he wrote, however, was not a straightforward task. In the 1920s, it was common for newspaper stories to run without crediting the author. Of the stories in the collection, only 137 were bylined Ernest M. Hemingway (he did not stop using his middle initial until later in his career). The rest of the stories had either no byline, or occasionally pseudonyms if Hemingway already had one story in the paper.

In researching Hemingway's career for the Centennial of the Toronto Star, reporter William Burrill uncovered evidence of 30 additional stories that he had written for the Toronto Star, but had been either missed by earlier researchers, published without Hemingway's bylines, or published under such bylines as "Peter Jackson" or "John Hadley", which were known Hemingway pseudonyms already identified in White's collection When Hemingway had returned from Europe, his editor possibly punished him by refusing to allow him bylines, but many of the stories identified by Burrill had evidence pointing to his authorship. (Most of these additional "lost" stories can be found in William Burrill's book Hemingway, The Toronto Years, a 392-page award-winning biography that also fully reprints 25 of the "lost" Hemingway stories in Burrill's 135-page appendix. (Doubleday Canada, Hardcover 1994, ISBN 0-385-25489-X and Trade Paper 1995, ISBN 0-385-25558-6). Furthermore, Burrill points out that the Toronto Star archives only maintained copies of the final edition of the newspaper; Hemingway may have written stories that fell out of the final edition and as such his complete works for the Toronto Star may never be known.

== Hemingway style ==
Many of the stylistic techniques and themes that would characterize Hemingway's writing were first put to use for the Star. In a dispatch from Spain in 1922, he would write a passage reminiscent of his Pulitzer-prize winning The Old Man and the Sea:

But if you land a big tuna after a six-hour fight, fight him man against fish until your muscles are nauseated with the unceasing strain, and finally bring him up alongside the boat, green-blue and silver in the lazy ocean, you will be purified and will be able to enter unabashed into the presence of the very elder gods and they will make you welcome." Ideas later surfaced in The Old Man and the Sea. "At Vigo, in Spain, Is Where You Catch the Silver and Blue Tuna, the King of All Fish, The Toronto Star Weekly, February 18, 1922

On assignment for the Toronto Star, Hemingway also wrote about his first bullfight in a lengthy feature ("Bull-Fighting Is Not a Sport—It Is a Tragedy", The Toronto Star Weekly, October 20, 1923). Bullfighting would become a major motif in his writing, appearing in The Sun Also Rises and Death in the Afternoon. His stories also displayed his characteristic sparse use of language, attention to detail, and ear for dialogue.

A humorous streak is also present in much of Hemingway's newspaper writing. Humor, however was not common in his later writing, possibly because the humor reminded him of journalism, or because he believed the humor was simply not appropriate in serious literature. All the literary and humorous flourishes in his writing have led to suspicion that his stories may have included details that were embellished.

Hemingway would grow to disavow his newspaper writing, and did not wish for it to be compared to his later publications; he reportedly would become infuriated at such comparisons.

== See also ==
- By-Line: Ernest Hemingway (1967) – a collection of 77 articles Hemingway wrote as a journalist between 1920 and 1956.
