= The Cambridge Edition of the Letters of Ernest Hemingway =

Publication of works by Ernest Hemingway

The Cambridge Edition of the Letters of Ernest Hemingway is an ongoing scholarly multi-volume publication of the letters of Ernest Hemingway undertaken by the Cambridge University Press. Out of the projected 16 volumes, the first volume, covering years from 1907 to 1922, was published in 2011. The project, when completed, will collect every extant Hemingway letter, numbering over 6,000, and is being edited by Sandra Spanier, professor of English at Pennsylvania State University. The project may take 20 years to finish.

== Volume 1 ==
- Available in Hardback and Fine/Leather Binding
- Years covered: 1907–1922
- Published: 20 September 2011
- Pages: 516
- ISBN 978-0521897334

== Volume 2 ==
- Available in Hardback and Fine/Leather Binding (£75)
- Years covered: 1923–1925
- Published: 30 September 2013
- Pages: 515
- ISBN 978-0521897341
- Fine/Leather Binding: ISBN 978-1107624665

== Volume 3 ==
- Available in Hardback
- Years covered: 1926–1929
- Published: 14 October 2015
- Pages: 731
- ISBN 978-0521897358

== Volume 4 ==
- Available in Hardback
- Years covered: 1929–1931
- Published: 16 November 2017
- Pages: 818
- ISBN 978-0521897341

== Volume 5 ==
- Available in Hardback
- Years covered: 1932–1934
- Published: 31 July 2020
- Pages: 840
- ISBN 978-0521897372

== Volume 6 ==
- Available in Hardback
- Years covered: 1934–1936
- Published: 16 May 2024
- Pages: 786
- ISBN 978-0521897389
