= 88 Poems =

1979 poetry collection by Ernest Hemingway

First edition (publ. Harcourt Brace Jovanovich)

88 Poems is a book of the collected poetry of author Ernest Hemingway, published in 1979. It includes a number of poems published in magazines, the poems which appeared in Hemingway's first book, Three Stories and Ten Poems, and 47 previously unpublished poems that were found in private collections and in the Hemingway papers held by the Kennedy Library.
