= John Unsworth =

- Born: 1958 (age 67–68); Northampton, Massachusetts, U.S.
- Education: Princeton University; Amherst College (BA); Boston University (MA, PhD)

John M. Unsworth is the university librarian and dean of libraries at the University of Virginia, a position he has held since June 25, 2016.

== Biography ==
John Unsworth was born in 1958, in Northampton, Massachusetts. He graduated from Northampton High School in 1975, and attended Princeton University and Amherst College as an undergraduate, graduating from Amherst in 1981. He received a master's degree in English from Boston University in 1982 and a Ph.D. in English from the University of Virginia in 1988. His first faculty appointment was in English, at North Carolina State University, from 1989 to 1993. In 1990, at North Carolina State University, he co-founded the first peer-reviewed electronic journal in the humanities, Postmodern Culture (now published by Johns Hopkins University Press, as part of Project Muse). He also organized, incorporated, and chaired the Text Encoding Initiative Consortium, co-chaired the Modern Language Association's Committee on Scholarly Editions, and served as President of the Association for Computers and the Humanities and later as chair of the steering committee for the Alliance of Digital Humanities Organizations, as well as serving on many other editorial and advisory boards.

From 1993 to 2003, he was a faculty member in the English department at the University of Virginia, where he served as the first director of the Institute for Advanced Technology in the Humanities. From 2003 to 2012 he was the dean of the Graduate School of Library and Information Science at the University of Illinois at Urbana–Champaign and was also on the faculty of the English department. From 2012 to 2016, he was the university librarian, vice provost, and chief information officer at Brandeis University. Unsworth was also a professor of English at Brandeis, teaching courses on the Digital Humanities and on 20th-century American bestsellers. In August 2013, the White House appointed Unsworth to the National Council on the Humanities, the advisory board of the National Endowment for the Humanities, a post he held through January 26, 2016.

John Unsworth is the university librarian and dean of libraries at the University of Virginia, a position he has held since June 25, 2016.

== Bibliography ==
- Unsworth, J., Susan Schreibman and Ray Siemens (Eds). “A Companion to Digital Humanities” New York: Blackwells (2004). ISBN 978-1-4051-0321-3 http://www.digitalhumanities.org/companion/
- ‘Our Cultural Commonwealth: The Report of the American Council of Learned Societies Commission on Cyberinfrastructure for the Humanities and Social Sciences’ (Commission chair). ACLS: New York, 2006. Available: http://www.acls.org/cyberinfrastructure/ourculturalcommonwealth.pdf
- Unsworth, J., Lou Burnard, and Katherine O’Brien O’Keefe (Eds). “Electronic Textual Editing” New York: MLA, 2006. ISBN 9780873529716 http://www.tei-c.org/About/Archive_new/ETE/Preview/
- Unsworth, J. "University 2.0" in The Tower and the Cloud. Richard N. Katz, (Ed.). EDUCAUSE, 2008. ISBN 978-0-9672853-9-9. http://www.educause.edu/research-and-publications/books/tower-and-cloud
- “Medievalists as Early Adopters of Information Technology” Digital Medievalist 7 (2011). ISSN 1715-0736
- Video: On May 25, 2012, the BNN Symposium featured Paul Courant and John Unsworth at the MIT Faculty Club in Cambridge speaking on "The HathiTrust, Google Books, and the Future of Research." "Building (and using) Big Digital Libraries". Video also available from the Boston Library Consortium.
