= Ernest Hemingway: Selected Letters, 1917–1961 =

Book by Ernest Hemingway

First edition (publ. Scribner)

Ernest Hemingway: Selected Letters, 1917–1961 is a book composed of letters to and from Ernest Hemingway found at his Cuban home after his death, edited by Hemingway biographer Carlos Baker.

Hemingway was a prolific correspondent and in 1981 many of his letters were published by Scribner's in the volume. Although Hemingway wrote to his executors in 1958 asking that his letters not be published, in 1979 his widow Mary Hemingway made the decision to have the letters published.
