= Josephine Miles =

American poet and academic (1911–1985)

Josephine Miles

Josephine Louise Miles (June 11, 1911 – May 12, 1985) was an American poet and literary critic; the first woman tenured in the English department at the University of California, Berkeley. She wrote over a dozen books of poetry and several works of criticism. Miles was a foundational scholar of quantitative and computational methods, and is considered a pioneer of the field of digital humanities. Benjamin H. Lehman and Josephine Miles' interdepartmental "Prose Improvement Project" was the basis for James Gray's Bay Area Writing Project, which later became the National Writing Project. The "Prose Improvement Project" was one of the first efforts at creating a writing across the curriculum program.

== Early life and education ==
Miles was born in Chicago, in 1911. When she was young, her family moved to Southern California. Due to disabling arthritis, she was educated at home by tutors, but was able to graduate from Los Angeles High School in a class that included the composer John Cage.

In reference to her lifelong disability, Thom Gunn recollected that "The unavoidable first fact about Josephine Miles was physical. As a young child she contracted a form of degenerative arthritis so severe that it left her limbs deformed and crippled. As a result, she could not be left alone in a house, she could not handle a mug...she could not use a typewriter; and she could neither walk nor operate a wheelchair."

Miles attended the University of California, Los Angeles, where she earned a bachelor's degree in English literature before moving to Berkeley to pursue a doctorate. She received a Fellowship from the American Association of University Women in 1939. Her dissertation work on Wordsworth led to Wordsworth and the Vocabulary of Emotion, published in 1942.

== Career ==
During the 1930s and 1940s, Miles conducted quantitative stylistic research projects, first on "the adjectives favored by Romantic poets" and second on "the phrasal forms of the poetry of the 1640s, 1740s, and 1840s." She later became a foundational scholar of quantitative and computational methods in the humanities.

In 1951, she became director of a project at Berkeley to create a concordance to the poetical works of John Dryden. The project had been initiated years earlier by her colleague in the English department, Guy Montgomery, who by the time of his death had amassed 250,000 manual index cards listing the various words used by Dryden and the poems and line numbers where they occurred. Miles worked with the Electrical Engineering department to complete the concordance using punched cards and card-reading computers. After five years of work by Miles, her graduate students Mary Jackman and Helen S. Angoa, and with assistance from several punch card operators, the concordance was completed and published in 1957. This has been described as "possibly the first literary concordance to use machine methods"; it was published seventeen years before the first volume of Roberto Busa's Index Thomisticus, a work widely credited with this first. Her innovative computational approach to literary analysis has resulted in her being considered a pioneer of the field of digital humanities.

In 1964, Miles was elected a Fellow of the American Academy of Arts and Sciences. She remained in Berkeley for the rest of her life, receiving multiple fellowships and awards until her death in May 1985. She was the first woman to receive tenure in the English Department at Berkeley and, at the time of her death, held the position of University Professor.

Miles was fascinated with Beat poetry, and was both a host and critic to many Beat poets from her chair at Berkeley. Most notably, she helped Allen Ginsberg publish Howl, recommending it to Richard Eberhart who published an article in The New York Times praising the poem. In 1974, she founded the internationally distributed Berkeley Poetry Review on the U.C. Berkeley campus. She mentored many young poets, including Jack Spicer, Robin Blaser, Diane Wakoski, Diana O'Hehir, William Stafford, and A. R. Ammons.

== Legacy ==
Miles bequeathed her Berkeley home to the University of California, which offers the house for use by the visiting Roberta C. Holloway Lecturer in the Practice of Poetry. The PEN Oakland/Josephine Miles Literary Award was established in her honor to recognize achievement in multicultural literature.
