= John Koethe =

American poet

John L. Koethe
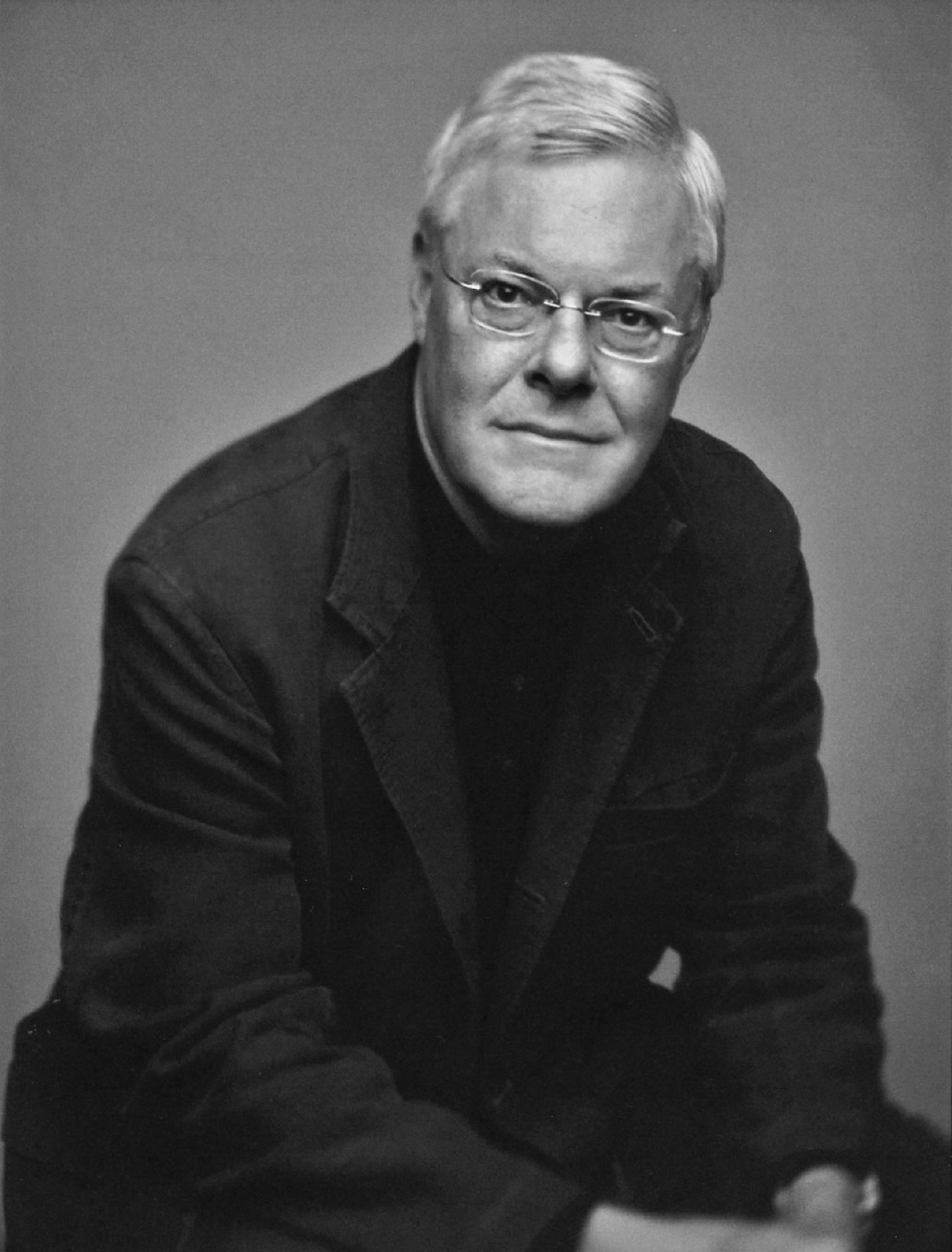
- Publishing still shot of Koethe
- Born: December 25, 1945 (age 80); San Diego, California
- Occupations: Poet, philosopher, author

John Koethe (born December 25, 1945) is an American poet, essayist and professor of philosophy at the University of Wisconsin–Milwaukee.

== Biography ==
Koethe is originally from San Diego, California. He was educated at Princeton University and Harvard University.

== Inspiration and influences ==
Koethe has stated that the inspiration for many of his poems comes "in the shower, and while I'm shaving." He has said he loves living in Wisconsin, and that he finds the state beautiful. He has titled several of his poems after places in his hometown of Milwaukee, including "Hackett Avenue."

As influences on his poetry, he identifies several people, including famed writers William Wordsworth and Marcel Proust.

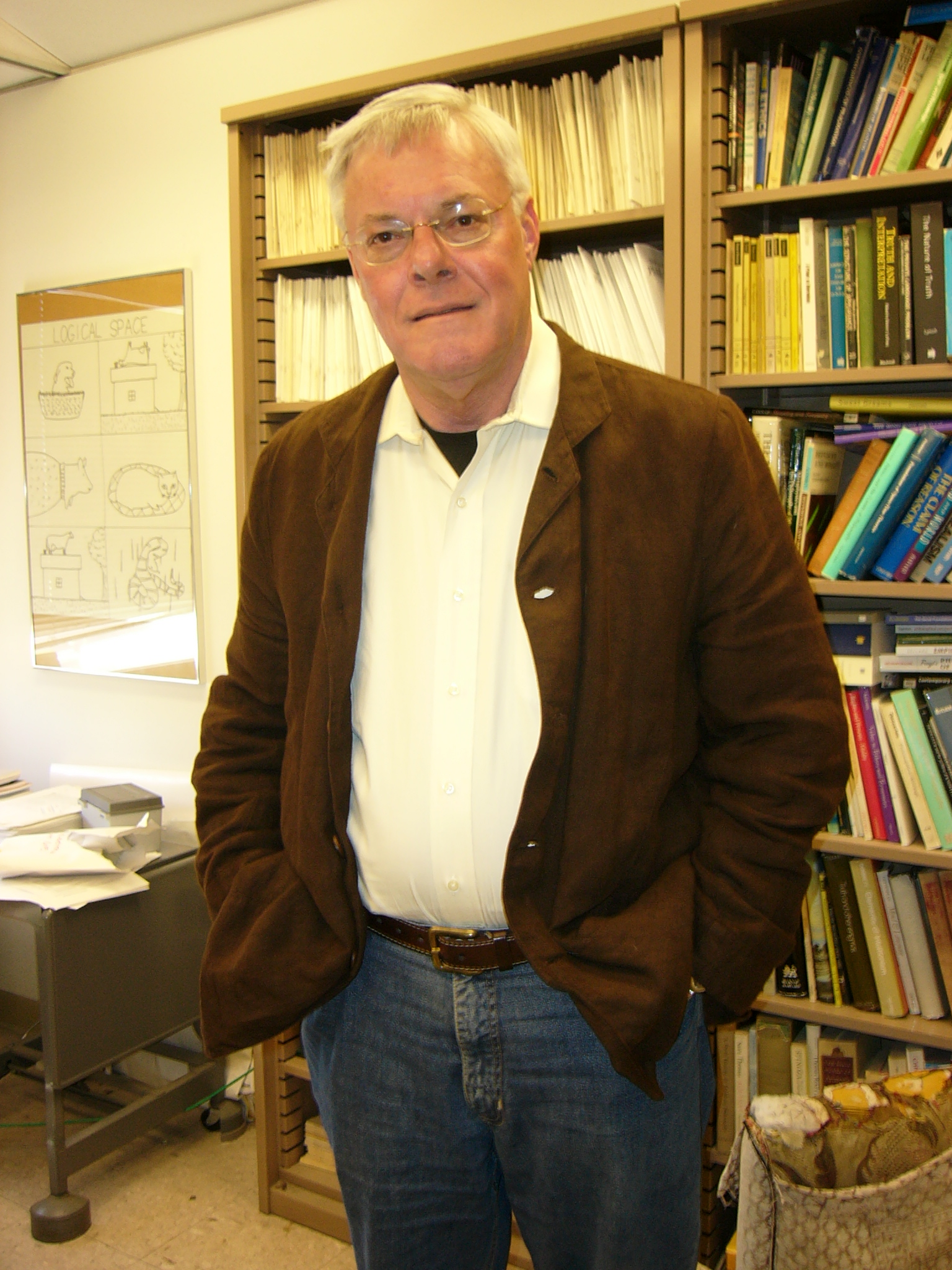
Koethe, in his university office.

In his philosophy, Koethe's research focuses on the philosophy of language, Wittgenstein, and epistemology.

== Writing career ==
In addition to the work listed in the bibliography below, Koethe has also contributed poetry and essays to several publications including Poetry, Paris Review, Quarterly Review of Literature, Parnassus, and Art News. His work has been included in anthologies of poetry, including The Best American Poetry (2003). Additionally, he was selected to contribute his views on contemporary poetry for the book Ecstatic Occasions, Expedient Forms, which billed him as one of "85 leading contemporary poets."

== Bibliography ==
=== Poetry ===
Collections

- Blue Vents (Audit/Poetry, 1969)
- Domes (Columbia University Press, 1973)
- The Late Wisconsin Spring (Princeton University Press, 1984)
- The Continuity of Wittgenstein's Thought (Cornell University Press, 1996)
- Falling Water (HarperPerennial, 1997)
- The Constructor, (HarperFlamingo, 1999)
- Poetry at One Remove (University of Michigan Press, 2000)
- North Point North: New and Selected Poems (HarperCollins, 2002).
- Scepticism, Knowledge, and Forms of Reasoning (Cornell University Press, 2005)
- Sally's Hair (HarperCollins, 2006)
- Ninety-fifth Street (Harper Parennial, 2009)
- ROTC Kills (Harper Perennial, 2012).
- The Swimmer (Farrar, Straus and Giroux, 2016)
- Walking Backwards: Poems, 1966-2016 (Farrar, Straus and Giroux, 2018), ISBN 978-0-374-28579-1

List of poems

Title	Year	First published	Reprinted/collected
Covers band in a small bar	2015	Koethe, John (April 6, 2015). "Covers band in a small bar". The New Yorker. Vol. 91, no. 7. p. 26.	

== Critical reception ==
Koethe's work has been well received by critics and academicians. John Freeman, writing in the Milwaukee Journal-Sentinel, praised Sally's Hair by noting: "We're wrapped around [Koethe's] finger." He cited passages that alternatively explored the poet's most intimate layers before "ricochet[ing] back out into airy ponderings."

Robert Hahn, writing for The Kenyon Review, noted how Koethe's poetry paid homage to legendary literary influences, yet still retained a distinctively trenchant voice. Hahn praised Koethe as a poet of "striking and significant originality."

Andrew Yaphe, writing in the Chicago Review, hailed Koethe as being "widely recognized as one of our foremost Romantic poets, an inheritor of the tradition of Stevens and Ashbery." And Prof. Bill Olsen of Western Michigan University prefixed a January 2005 public reading by Koethe by stating: "Reading or hearing a John Koethe poem is like listening to yourself – like hearing parts of your own consciousness for the first time."

== Awards and honours ==
Koethe's Domes won the Frank O'Hara Award for Poetry, and his Falling Water won the Kingsley Tufts Poetry Award from Claremont Graduate University. He has been granted fellowships from the Guggenheim Foundation and the National Endowment for the Arts and he has been nominated for the New Yorker Book Award, the Boston Book Review Award and the Los Angeles Times Book Prize, and the Boston Book Review Book Award. He is a fellow of the American Academy in Berlin, and the recipient of a lifetime achievement award from the Council for Wisconsin Writers.

In February 2000, Koethe was named the first poet laureate for the city of Milwaukee, for which he received a $2,500 honorarium over two years. When asked in an interview what being the poet laureate required, Koethe replied: "I was the first one, and no one was quite sure what exactly I was supposed to do. The Friends of the Library oversaw the position, so together, we just sort of made it up. I read Dr. Seuss to some kids, gave a poetry reading, read a poem to The Common Council. I also introduced four writers at Centennial Hall: two fiction writers, Martha Berglund and C.J. Hribal, and two poets Susan Firer and Lisa Samuels."
