= Susan Schreibman =

Digital humanities scholar

- Schreibman at the 2017 Digital Humanities conference in Tartu
- Known for: Digital scholarly editions and humanities infrastructure

Academic work
- Discipline: Digital humanities
- Institutions: Maastricht University; Trinity College Dublin; University of Maryland, College Park

Susan Schreibman is a digital humanities scholar and Professor of Digital Arts and Culture at Maastricht University. Her work includes digital scholarly editions, text encoding, research infrastructure and humanities teaching. In September 2024 she became a director of DARIAH, the European digital research infrastructure for the arts and humanities.

== Career ==
Before joining Maastricht, Schreibman held leadership positions at Trinity College Dublin and the University of Maryland, College Park. At Maryland she served as assistant director of the Maryland Institute for Technology in the Humanities and later as assistant dean for digital collections and research in the university libraries. In Ireland she was founding director of the Digital Humanities Observatory, a national centre developed under the auspices of the Royal Irish Academy.

Her projects include The Thomas MacGreevy Archive, Irish Resources in the Humanities and The Versioning Machine. She is also founding editor of the Journal of the Text Encoding Initiative and has edited collaborative reference works in digital humanities and digital literary studies.

== DARIAH ==
Schreibman participated in DARIAH's preparatory phase as an Irish representative. She served as national coordinator in Ireland from 2010 to 2016 and co-chaired its Education and Research Virtual Competence Center from 2011 to 2016. Work under that co-leadership included the Digital Humanities Course Registry and the #dariahTeach service.

DARIAH's General Assembly appointed her as a director with effect from 1 September 2024. The position forms part of a three-member board responsible for the consortium's day-to-day direction, linking her institutional research career with European infrastructure development.

== Publications ==
Schreibman's publications include Collected Poems of Thomas MacGreevy: An Annotated Edition (1991). She co-edited A Companion to Digital Humanities and, with Ray Siemens, A Companion to Digital Literary Studies. Her editorial work has helped define digital editing and humanities computing as areas of scholarly practice rather than merely technical support.

== Research infrastructure ==
Before Maastricht she directed An Foras Feasa, the humanities research institute at Maynooth University, and her project work there is the practical counterpart to her writing on editing: Letters of 1916, a public collection of correspondence written in Ireland in the year of the Rising, and Contested Memories: The Battle of Mount Street Bridge, a three-dimensional reconstruction of one of the largest engagements of Easter week. Both are exercises in the same argument — that a scholarly edition is now a set of data and interfaces rather than a printed volume.

Her appointment at DARIAH in September 2024 was a return rather than an arrival. She had represented Ireland during the infrastructure's preparatory phase, co-chaired its Virtual Competency Centre for Education and Research from 2011 to 2016, and under that co-leadership two of DARIAH's better-known services were built: the Digital Humanities Course Registry and #dariahTeach. She succeeded Toma Tasovac after his six-year term, becoming one of the three part-time directors the statutes provide for.
