= Pan South African Language Board =

South African multilingualism organisation

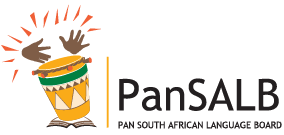
- Formation: 1995
- Headquarters: Arcadia, Pretoria
- Coordinates: 25.7455°S 28.2049°E
- Official language: 12 languages: Afrikaans; Sepedi; English; Southern Ndebele; Southern Sotho; Swazi; Tsonga; Tswana; Venda; Xhosa; Zulu; SA Sign Language
- CEO: Dr Keobaka Seshoka
- Chairperson: Prof Lolie Makhubu-Badenhorst
- Deputy Chairperson: 2) Dr Napjadi Eugene Letsoalo
- Board of directors: Dr Gaesebeng Fio Dolly Dlavane, Adv Toto Jeremiah Fiduli, Dr Mpho Dellynah Mudau, Dr Rajendran Thangavelu Govender, Dr Tsholofelo Masetshaba Mosala, Dr Xolani David Khohliso, Dr Godfrey Vulindlela Mona, Ms Maseje Felicia Nchabeleng, Ms Naledi Maponopono, Ms Nalini Maharaj
- Key people: Company Secretary: Ms Prenitha Kantha Padayachee
- Website: www.pansalb.org

The Pan South African Language Board (Afrikaans: Pan-Suid-Afrikaanse Taalraad, abbreviated PanSALB) is an organisation in South Africa established to promote multilingualism, to develop and preserve the 12 official languages, and to protect language rights in South Africa. The Board was established in terms of Act 59 of 1995 by the Parliament of South Africa.

In addition to the 12 official languages of South Africa, PanSALB also strives to create conditions for the use and development of all languages used by communities in the country including the Khoe, San, and Nama.

PanSALB structures include: the Provincial Language Committees (PLCs), the National Language Bodies (NLBs), and the National Lexicography Units (NLUs).

== SWiP Collaboration ==
In 2023, a collaborative project began between PanSALB, SADiLaR (the South African Centre for Digital Language Resources), and Wikimedia ZA to advance the use of vernacular language on Wikipedia as well as the presence of indigenous South African languages in cyberspace. The project is abbreviated as SWiP: combining the names of SADiLAR, Wikipedia, and PanSALB. Participants are introduced to Wikipedia and attend authorship training on how to add content, citations, and photographs.

== Controversy ==
In January 2016, South African Minister of Arts and Culture, Nathi Mthethwa dissolved the entire board of PanSALB, after a report that between 2014 and 2015, the board's administrative expenditure had increased from 8 million to 11 million ZAR, while the expenditure on its mandate dropped to 17 million from 23 million ZAR, while its irregular expenditure was 28 million.

== See also ==
- Die Taalkommissie
- Languages of South Africa
