= Digital humanities =

Area of scholarly activity

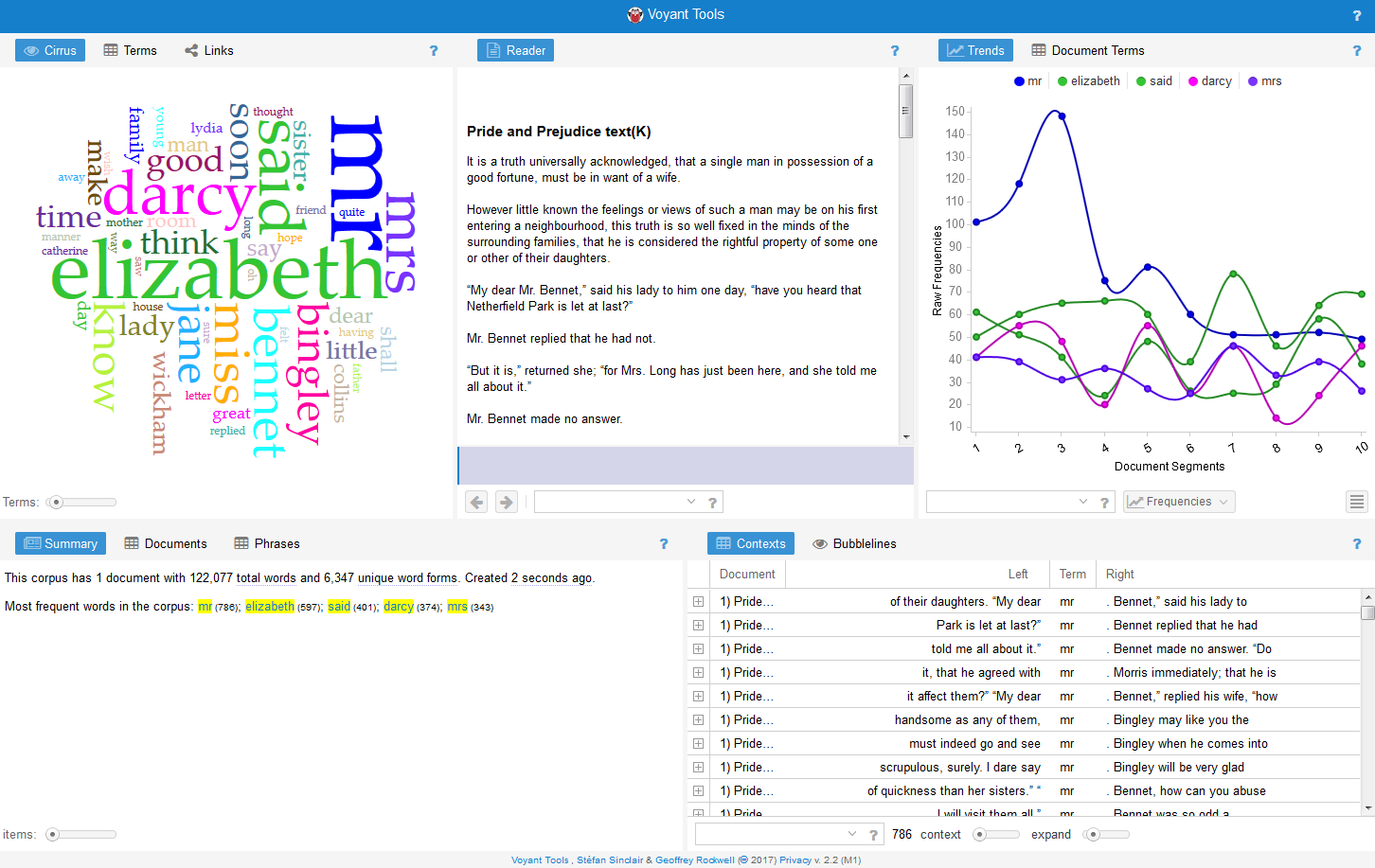
Example of a textual analysis program being used to study a novel, with Jane Austen's Pride and Prejudice in Voyant Tools

Digital humanities (DH) is an area of scholarly activity at the intersection of computing or digital technologies and the disciplines of the humanities. It includes the systematic use of digital resources in the humanities, as well as the analysis of their application. DH can be defined as new ways of doing scholarship that involve collaborative, transdisciplinary, and computationally engaged research, teaching, and publishing. It brings digital tools and methods to the study of the humanities with the recognition that the printed word is no longer the main medium for knowledge production and distribution.

By producing and using new applications and techniques, DH makes new kinds of teaching possible while also studying and critiquing their impact on cultural heritage and digital culture. A distinctive feature of DH is its cultivation of a two-way relationship between the humanities and the digital: the field both employs technology in the pursuit of humanities research and subjects technology to humanistic questioning and interrogation.

== Definition ==
Scholars and practitioners are continually reformulating the definition of the digital humanities, so specific definitions can unnecessarily limit future potential. The second volume of Debates in the Digital Humanities (2016) acknowledges the difficulty in defining the field: "Along with the digital archives, quantitative analyses, and tool-building projects that once characterized the field, DH now encompasses a wide range of methods and practices: visualizations of large image sets, 3D modeling of historical artifacts, 'born digital' dissertations, hashtag activism and the analysis thereof, alternate reality games, mobile makerspaces, and more. In what has been called 'big tent' DH, it can at times be difficult to determine with any specificity what, precisely, digital humanities work entails."

Digital humanities developed from humanities computing and has since become associated with other fields, such as humanistic computing, social computing, and media studies. The digital humanities embrace a variety of topics, from curating online collections of primary sources (primarily textual) to the data mining of large cultural data sets to topic modeling. Digital humanities incorporates both digitized (remediated) and born-digital materials and combines the methodologies from traditional humanities disciplines (such as rhetoric, history, philosophy, linguistics, literature, art, archaeology, music, and cultural studies) and social sciences, with tools provided by computing (such as hypertext, hypermedia, data visualisation, information retrieval, data mining, statistics, text mining, digital mapping), and digital publishing. Related subfields of digital humanities have emerged, like software studies, platform studies, and critical code studies. Fields that parallel the digital humanities include new media studies and information science as well as media theory of composition, game studies, particularly in areas related to digital humanities project design and production, and cultural analytics. Each disciplinary field and each country has its own unique history of digital humanities.

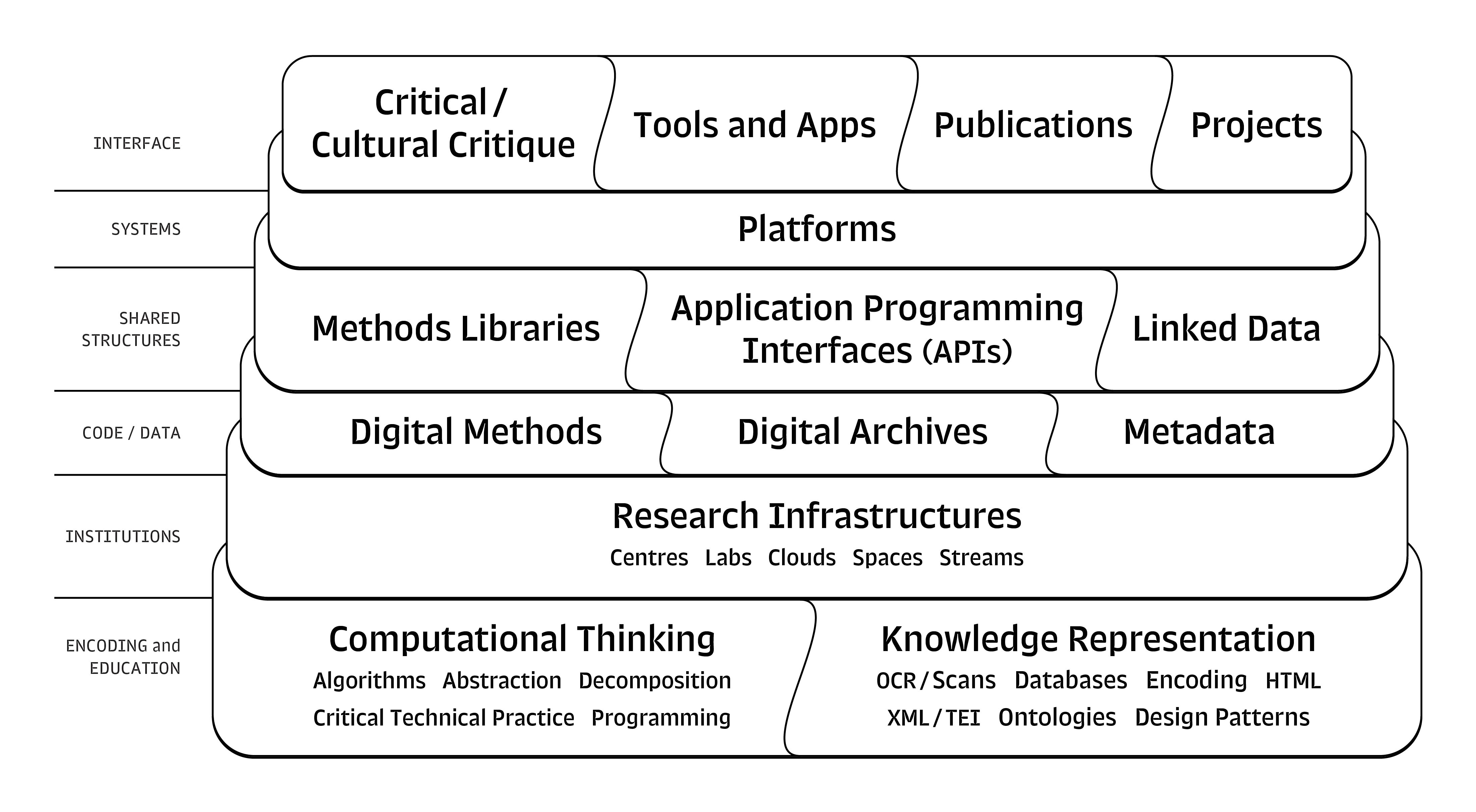
The Digital Humanities Stack (from Berry and Fagerjord, Digital Humanities: Knowledge and Critique in a Digital Age)

Berry and Fagerjord have suggested that a way to reconceptualise digital humanities could be through a "digital humanities stack", to map the different "activities, practices, skills, technologies and structures that could be said to make up the digital humanities". This draws upon the way the term stack is used in computer science and in science and technology studies. For Berry and Fagerjord, computational thinking and knowledge representation are the foundation of the stack, with other elements building upon these.

In practical terms, a major distinction within digital humanities is the focus on the data being processed. For processing textual data, digital humanities builds on a long and extensive history of digital edition, computational linguistics, and natural language processing and developed an independent and highly specialized technology stack (largely cumulating in the specifications of the Text Encoding Initiative). This part of the field is sometimes thus set apart from Digital Humanities in general as 'digital philology' or 'computational philology'. For the creation and analysis of digital editions of objects or artifacts, digital philologists have access to digital practices, methods, and technologies, such as optical character recognition, that provide opportunities to adapt the field to the digital age.

== History ==
Digital humanities descends from the field of humanities computing, whose origins reach back to 1940s and 50s, in the pioneering work of Jesuit scholar Roberto Busa, which began in 1946, and of English professor Josephine Miles, beginning in the early 1950s. In collaboration with IBM, Busa and his team created a computer-generated concordance to Thomas Aquinas' writings known as the Index Thomisticus. Busa's works have been collected and translated by Julianne Nyhan and Marco Passarotti. Other scholars began using mainframe computers to automate tasks like word-searching, sorting, and counting, which was much faster than processing information from texts with handwritten or typed index cards. Similar first advances were made by Gerhard Sperl in Austria using computers by Zuse for Digital Assyriology. In the decades which followed archaeologists, classicists, historians, literary scholars, and a broad array of humanities researchers in other disciplines applied emerging computational methods to transform humanities scholarship.

As Tara McPherson has pointed out, the digital humanities also inherit practices and perspectives developed through many artistic and theoretical engagements with electronic screen culture beginning in the late 1960s and 1970s. These range from research developed by organizations such as SIGGRAPH to creations by artists such as Charles and Ray Eames and the members of E.A.T. (Experiments in Art and Technology). The Eames and E.A.T. explored nascent computer culture and intermediality in creative works that dovetailed technological innovation with art.

The first specialized journal in the digital humanities was Computers and the Humanities, which debuted in 1966. The Computer Applications and Quantitative Methods in Archaeology (CAA) association was founded in 1973. The Association for Literary and Linguistic Computing (ALLC) and the Association for Computers and the Humanities (ACH) were then founded in 1977 and 1978, respectively.

Soon, there was a need for a standardized protocol for tagging digital texts, and the Text Encoding Initiative (TEI) was developed. The TEI project was launched in 1987 and published the first full version of the TEI Guidelines in May 1994. TEI helped shape the field of electronic textual scholarship and led to the development of Extensible Markup Language (XML), a tag scheme for digital editing. Researchers also began experimenting with databases and hypertextual editing, which are structured around links and nodes, as opposed to the standard linear convention of print. In the nineties, major digital text and image archives emerged at centers of humanities computing in the U.S. (e.g., the Walt Whitman Archive, the Women Writers Project, the Rossetti Archive, and The William Blake Archive), which demonstrated the sophistication and robustness of text-encoding for literature. The advent of personal computing and the World Wide Web meant that Digital Humanities work could become less centered on text and more on design. The internet's multimedia nature has enabled Digital Humanities work to incorporate audio, video, and other media alongside text.

The terminological change from "humanities computing" to "digital humanities" has been attributed to John Unsworth, Susan Schreibman, and Ray Siemens who, as editors of the anthology A Companion to Digital Humanities (2004), tried to prevent the field from being viewed as "mere digitization". Consequently, the hybrid term has created an overlap between fields like rhetoric and composition, which use "the methods of contemporary humanities in studying digital objects", and digital humanities, which uses "digital technology in studying traditional humanities objects". The use of computational systems and the study of computational media within the humanities, arts and social sciences more generally has been termed the 'computational turn'.

In 2006, the National Endowment for the Humanities (NEH) launched the Digital Humanities Initiative (renamed Office of Digital Humanities in 2008), which made widespread adoption of the term "digital humanities" in the United States.

Digital humanities emerged from its former niche status and became "big news" at the 2009 MLA convention in Philadelphia, where digital humanists made "some of the liveliest and most visible contributions" and had their field hailed as "the first 'next big thing' in a long time."

== Values and methods ==
Although digital humanities projects and initiatives are diverse, they often reflect common values and methods. These can help in understanding this hard-to-define field.

Values

- Critical and theoretical
- Iterative and experimental
- Collaborative and distributed
- Multimodal and performative
- Open and accessible

Methods

- Enhanced critical curation
- Augmented editions and fluid textuality
- Scale: the law of large numbers
- Distant/close, macro/micro, surface/depth
- Cultural analytics, aggregation, and data-mining
- Visualization and data design
- Locative investigation and thick mapping
- The animated archive
- Distributed knowledge production and performative access
- Humanities gaming
- Code, software, and platform studies
- Database documentaries
- Repurposable content and remix culture
- Pervasive infrastructure
- Ubiquitous scholarship

In keeping with the value of being open and accessible, many digital humanities projects and journals are open access and/or under Creative Commons licensing, showing the field's "commitment to open standards and open source." Open access is designed to enable anyone with an internet-enabled device and internet connection to view a website or read an article without having to pay, as well as share content with the appropriate permissions.

Digital humanities scholars use computational methods either to answer existing research questions or to challenge existing theoretical paradigms, generating new questions and pioneering new approaches. One goal is to integrate computer technology into the activities of humanities scholars systematically, as is done in contemporary empirical social sciences. Yet despite the significant trend in digital humanities towards networked and multimodal forms of knowledge, a substantial amount of digital humanities focuses on documents and text in ways that differentiate the field's work from digital research in media studies, information studies, communication studies, and sociology. Another goal of digital humanities is to create scholarship that transcends textual sources. This includes the integration of multimedia, metadata, and dynamic environments (see The Valley of the Shadow project at the University of Virginia, the Vectors Journal of Culture and Technology in a Dynamic Vernacular at University of Southern California, or Digital Pioneers projects at Harvard). A growing number of researchers in digital humanities are using computational methods for the analysis of large cultural data sets such as the Google Books corpus. Examples of such projects were highlighted by the Humanities High Performance Computing competition sponsored by the Office of Digital Humanities in 2008, and also by the Digging Into Data challenge organized in 2009 and 2011 by NEH in collaboration with NSF, and in partnership with JISC in the UK, and SSHRC in Canada. In addition to books, historical newspapers can also be analyzed with big data methods. The analysis of vast quantities of historical newspaper content has shown how periodic structures can be automatically discovered, and a similar analysis was performed on social media. As part of the big data revolution, gender bias, readability, content similarity, reader preferences, and even mood have been analyzed based on text mining methods over millions of documents and historical documents written in literary Chinese.

Digital humanities is also involved in the creation of software, providing "environments and tools for producing, curating, and interacting with knowledge that is 'born digital' and lives in various digital contexts." In this context, the field is sometimes known as computational humanities.

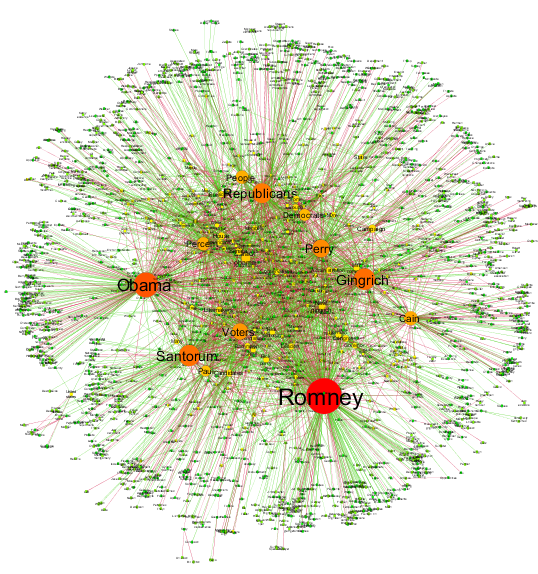
Narrative network of US Elections 2012

== Tools ==
Digital humanities scholars use a variety of digital tools for their research, which may take place in an environment as small as a mobile device or as large as a virtual reality lab. Environments for "creating, publishing and working with digital scholarship include everything from personal equipment to institutes and software to cyberspace." Some scholars use advanced programming languages and databases, while others use less complex tools, depending on their needs. DiRT (Digital Research Tools Directory) offers a registry of digital research tools for scholars. TAPoR (Text Analysis Portal for Research) is a gateway to text analysis and retrieval tools. An accessible, free example of an online textual analysis program is Voyant Tools, which only requires the user to copy and paste either a body of text or a URL and then click the 'reveal' button to run the program. There is also an online list of online or downloadable Digital Humanities tools that are largely free, aimed toward helping students and others who lack access to funding or institutional servers. Free, open source web publishing platforms like WordPress and Omeka are also popular tools.

== Projects ==
Digital humanities projects are more likely than traditional humanities work to involve a team or a lab, which may be composed of faculty, staff, graduate or undergraduate students, information technology specialists, and partners in galleries, libraries, archives, and museums. Credit and authorship are often shared among multiple people to reflect this collaborative nature, which differs from the sole-authorship model in the traditional humanities (and is more like that in the natural sciences).

There are thousands of digital humanities projects, ranging from small-scale ones with limited or no funding to large-scale ones with multi-year financial support. Some are continually updated while others may not be due to loss of support or interest, though they may remain online in either a beta version or a finished form. The following are a few examples of the variety of projects in the field:

=== Digital archives ===
The Women Writers Project (begun in 1988) is a long-term research project to make pre-Victorian women writers more accessible through an electronic collection of rare texts. The Walt Whitman Archive (begun in the 1990s) sought to create a hypertext and scholarly edition of Whitman's works and now includes photographs, sounds, and the only comprehensive current bibliography of Whitman criticism.

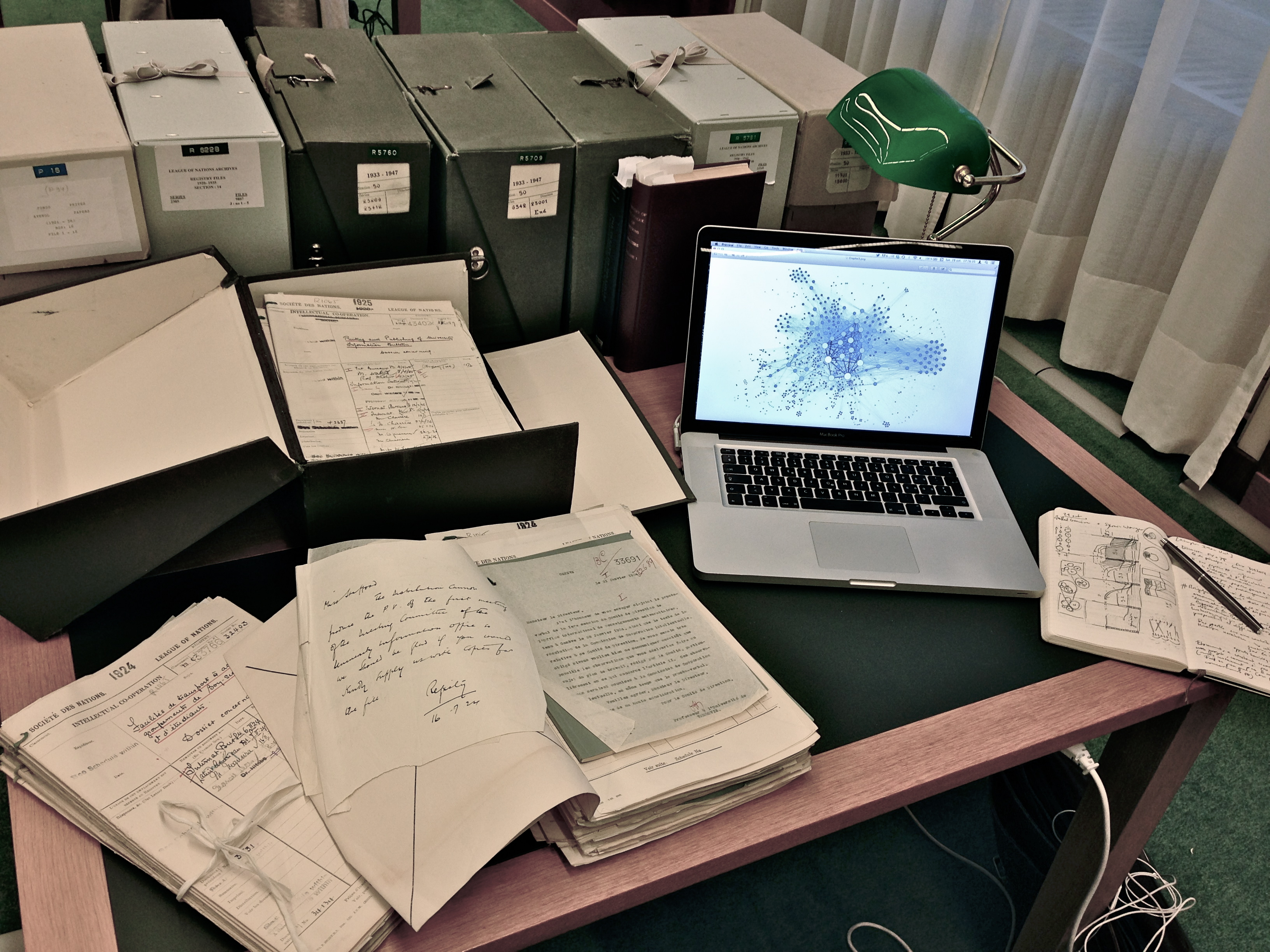
Example of network analysis as an archival tool at the League of Nations

The Slave Societies Digital Archive (formerly Ecclesiastical and Secular Sources for Slave Societies), directed by Jane Landers and hosted at Vanderbilt University, preserves endangered ecclesiastical and secular documents related to Africans and African-descended peoples in slave societies. This Digital Archive currently holds 500,000 unique images, dating from the 16th to the 20th centuries, and documents the history of between 6 and 8 million individuals. They are the most extensive serial records for the history of Africans in the Atlantic World and also include valuable information on the indigenous, European, and Asian populations who lived alongside them. Another example of a digital humanities project focused on the Americas is at the National Autonomous University of Mexico, which has the digitization of 17th-century manuscripts, an electronic corpus of Mexican history from the 16th to 19th century, and the visualization of pre-Hispanic archaeological sites in 3-D. A rare example of a digital humanities project focused on the cultural heritage of Africa is the Princeton Ethiopian, Eritrean, and Egyptian Miracles of Mary project, which documents African medieval stories, paintings, and manuscripts about the Virgin Mary from the 1300s into the 1900s.

The involvement of librarians and archivists plays an important part in digital humanities projects because of the recent expansion of their role so that it now covers digital curation, which is critical in the preservation, promotion, and access to digital collections, as well as the application of scholarly orientation to digital humanities projects. A specific example involves the case of initiatives where archivists help scholars and academics build their projects through their experience in evaluating, implementing, and customizing metadata schemas for library collections.

=== Cultural analytics ===
"Cultural analytics" refers to the use of computational methods to explore and analyze large visual collections and contemporary digital media. The concept was developed in 2005 by Lev Manovich, who then established the Cultural Analytics Lab in 2007 at Qualcomm Institute at California Institute for Telecommunication and Information (Calit2). The lab has been using methods from the field of computer science called Computer Vision to analyze many types of both historical and contemporary visual media—for example, all covers of Time magazine published between 1923 and 2009, 20,000 historical art photographs from the collection in Museum of Modern Art (MoMA) in New York, one million pages from Manga books, and 16 million images shared on Instagram in 17 global cities. Cultural analytics also includes using methods from media design and data visualization to create interactive visual interfaces for exploration of large visual collections, e.g., Selfiecity and On Broadway.

Cultural analytics research is also addressing some theoretical questions. How can we "observe" the giant cultural universes of both user-generated and professional media content created today without reducing them to averages, outliers, or preexisting categories? How can working with large cultural data help us question our stereotypes and assumptions about cultures? What new theoretical cultural concepts and models are required for studying global digital culture with its new mega-scale, speed, and connectivity?

The term "cultural analytics" (or "culture analytics") is now used by many other researchers, as exemplified by two academic symposiums, a four-month long research program at UCLA that brought together 120 leading researchers from university and industry labs, an academic peer-review Journal of Cultural Analytics: CA established in 2016, and academic job listings.

=== Textual mining, analysis, and visualization ===
WordHoard (begun in 2004) is a free application that enables scholarly but non-technical users to read and analyze, in new ways, deeply-tagged texts, including the canon of Early Greek epic, Chaucer, Shakespeare, and Spenser. The Republic of Letters (begun in 2008) seeks to visualize the social network of Enlightenment writers through an interactive map and visualization tools. Network analysis and data visualization are also used for reflection on the field itself – researchers may produce network maps of social media interactions or infographics based on data on digital humanities scholars and projects.

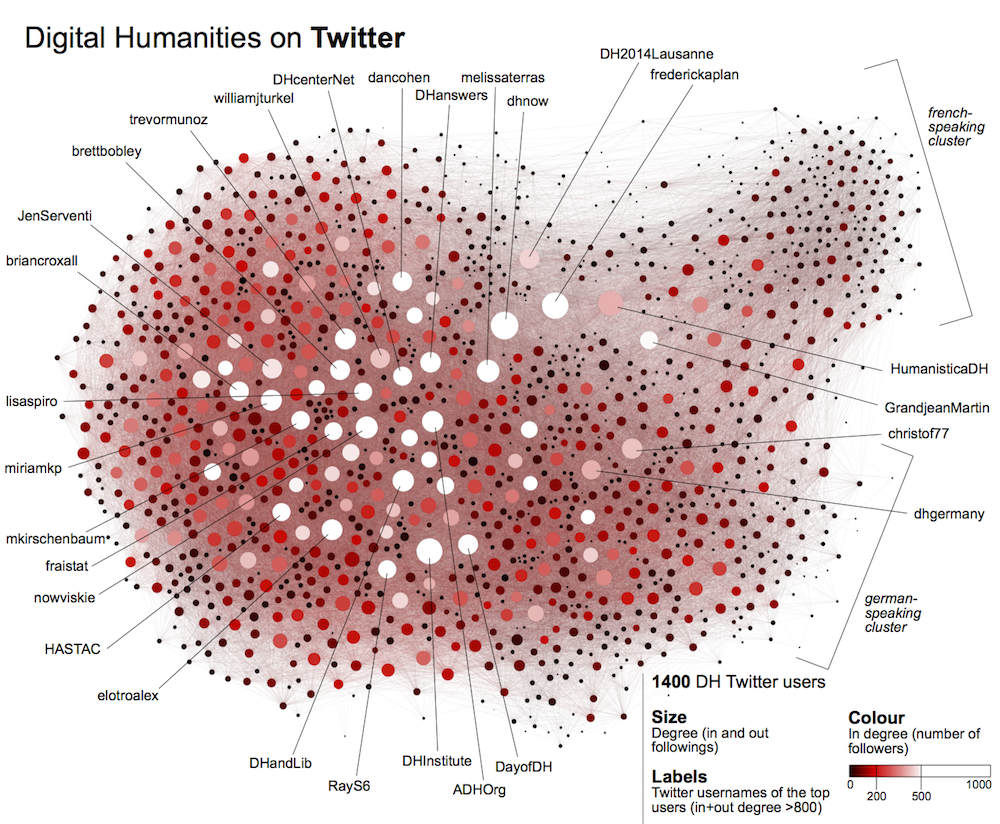
Network analysis: graph of Digital Humanities Twitter users

Document in Context of its Time (DICT) analysis style and an online demo tool allow users to discover if the vocabulary used by an author of an input text was frequent at the time of text creation, if the author used anachronisms or neologisms, and enables detecting terms in text that underwent considerable semantic change.

=== Analysis of macroscopic trends in cultural change ===
Culturomics is a form of computational lexicology that studies human behavior and cultural trends through the quantitative analysis of digitized texts. Researchers data mine large digital archives to investigate cultural phenomena reflected in language and word usage. The term is an American neologism first described in a 2010 Science article called Quantitative Analysis of Culture Using Millions of Digitized Books, co-authored by Harvard researchers Jean-Baptiste Michel and Erez Lieberman Aiden.

A 2017 study published in the Proceedings of the National Academy of Sciences of the United States of America compared the trajectory of n-grams over time in both digitised books from the 2010 Science article with those found in a large corpus of regional newspapers from the United Kingdom over the course of 150 years. The study further employed advanced natural language processing techniques to identify macroscopic trends in history and culture, including gender bias, geographical focus, technology, and politics, as well as accurate dates for specific events.

The applications of digital humanities can be used alongside other non-humanities subject areas, such as the pure sciences, agriculture, and management, to produce a wide variety of practical solutions to issues in industry and society.

=== Online publishing ===
The Stanford Encyclopedia of Philosophy (begun in 1995) is a dynamic reference work on terms, concepts, and figures in philosophy, maintained by scholars in the field. MLA Commons offers an open peer-review site (where anyone can comment) for their ongoing curated collection of teaching artifacts in Digital Pedagogy in the Humanities: Concepts, Models, and Experiments (2016). The Debates in the Digital Humanities platform contains volumes of the open-access book of the same title (2012 and 2016 editions) and allows readers to interact with material by marking sentences as interesting or adding terms to a crowdsourced index.

=== Wikimedia projects ===
Some research institutions work with the Wikimedia Foundation or community volunteers, for example, to make freely licensed media files available via Wikimedia Commons or to link or load datasets into Wikidata. Text analysis has been performed on the contribution history of articles on Wikipedia or its sister projects.

=== DH-OER ===
The 'South African Centre for Digital Language Resources' (SADiLaR ) was set up at a time when a global definition of Open Education Resources (OER) was being drafted and accepted by UNESCO SADiLaR saw this as an opportunity to stimulate activism and research around the use and creation of OERs for Digital Humanities. They initiated and launched the Digital Humanities OER ( DH-OER) project to raise consciousness about the costs of materials, foster the adoption of open principles and practices and support the growth of open education resources and digital humanities in South African Higher education institutions. DH-OER began with 26 projects and an introduction to openness in April 2022. It concluded in November 2023, when 16 projects showcased their efforts in a public event.

=== Artificial Intelligence (AI DH) ===
The emergence of large language models (LLMs) and generative AI (GenAI) has prompted calls for a closer integration of AI research and humanistic scholarship. In 2023, Katherine Elkins and Jon Chun introduced the term "AI DH" to describe a research practice in which artificial intelligence and humanistic inquiry are conducted as a single discipline rather than as separate fields linked by interdisciplinary collaboration. Researchers working in this mode have published in both AI venues, such as the International Conference on Machine Learning, and humanities journals, such as PMLA and Poetics Today, treating questions about authorship, narrative, and governance as simultaneously computational and humanistic problems. This integrated AI DH approach dates from the 2016 foundation of Kenyon College's interdisciplinary human-centered AI program and AI CoLab in the Integrated Program in Humane Studies.

By 2025, AI DH had evolved into a more institutionalized specialization within digital humanities, with adoption accelerating in response to advances in LLMs and generative AI. University research guides, such as the University of Southern California's AI and the Digital Humanities guide, document AI methodologies for text mining, sentiment analysis, and computer vision applied to cultural datasets, along with associated ethical considerations.

Related institutional support has included funding initiatives such as the Schmidt Sciences Humanities and AI Virtual Institute.

== Criticism ==
In 2012, Matthew K. Gold identified a range of perceived criticisms of the field of digital humanities: "a lack of attention to issues of race, class, gender, and sexuality; a preference for research-driven projects over pedagogical ones; an absence of political commitment; an inadequate level of diversity among its practitioners; an inability to address texts under copyright; and an institutional concentration in well-funded research universities". Similarly Berry and Fagerjord have argued that digital humanities should "focus on the need to think critically about the implications of computational imaginaries, and raise some questions in this regard. This is also to foreground the importance of the politics and norms that are embedded in digital technology, algorithms, and software. We need to explore how to negotiate between close and distant readings of texts and how micro-analysis and macro-analysis can be usefully reconciled in humanist work." Alan Liu has argued, "while digital humanists develop tools, data, and metadata critically, therefore (e.g., debating the 'ordered hierarchy of content objects' principle; disputing whether computation is best used for truth finding or, as Lisa Samuels and Jerome McGann put it, 'deformance'; and so on) rarely do they extend their critique to the full register of society, economics, politics, or culture." Some of these concerns have given rise to the emergent subfield of Critical Digital Humanities (CDH):

Some key questions include: how do we make the invisible become visible in the study of software? How is knowledge transformed when mediated through code and software? What are the critical approaches to Big Data, visualization, digital methods, etc.? How does computation create new disciplinary boundaries and gate-keeping functions? What are the new hegemonic representations of the digital – 'geons', 'pixels', 'waves', visualization, visual rhetorics, etc.? How do media changes create epistemic changes, and how can we look behind the 'screen essentialism' of computational interfaces? Here we might also reflect on how the practice of making-visible entails the making-invisible – computation involves making choices about what is to be captured.

=== Negative publicity ===
Lauren F. Klein and Gold note that many public media appearances of the digital humanities are critical. Armand Leroi, writing in The New York Times, discusses the contrast between the algorithmic analysis of themes in literary texts and the work of Harold Bloom, who qualitatively and phenomenologically analyzes literary themes over time. Leroi questions whether or not the digital humanities can provide a truly robust analysis of literature and social phenomena or offer a novel alternative perspective on them. The literary theorist Stanley Fish claims that the digital humanities pursue a revolutionary agenda and thereby undermine the conventional standards of "pre-eminence, authority and disciplinary power". However, digital humanities scholars note that "Digital Humanities is an extension of traditional knowledge skills and methods, not a replacement for them. Its distinctive contributions do not obliterate the insights of the past, but add and supplement the humanities' long-standing commitment to scholarly interpretation, informed research, structured argument, and dialogue within communities of practice".

Some have hailed the digital humanities as a solution to the apparent problems within the humanities, namely a decline in funding, recurring debates, and a fading set of theoretical claims and methodological arguments. Adam Kirsch, writing in the New Republic, calls this the "False Promise" of the digital humanities. While the rest of humanities and many social science departments are seeing a decline in funding or prestige, the digital humanities has been seeing increasing funding and prestige. Burdened by the problems of novelty, the digital humanities is discussed either as a revolutionary alternative to the humanities as usually conceived or as simply new wine in old bottles. Kirsch believes that digital humanities practitioners suffer from the problem of being marketers rather than scholars, who attest to the grand capacity of their research more than actually performing new analysis, and, when they do so, only perform trivial parlor tricks. This form of criticism has been repeated by others, such as in Carl Staumshein, writing in Inside Higher Education, who calls it a "Digital Humanities Bubble". Later in the same publication, Straumshein alleges that the digital humanities is a 'Corporatist Restructuring' of the Humanities. Some see the alliance of the digital humanities with business to be a positive turn that causes the business world to pay more attention, thus bringing needed funding and attention to the humanities. If the title of digital humanities did not burden it, it could escape the allegations that it is elitist and unfairly funded.

=== Black box ===
There has also been a critique of the use of digital humanities tools by scholars who do not fully understand what happens to the data they input and place too much trust in the "black box" of software that cannot be sufficiently examined for errors. Johanna Drucker, a professor at UCLA Department of Information Studies, has criticized the "epistemological fallacies" prevalent in popular visualization tools and technologies (such as Google's n-gram graph) used by digital humanities scholars and the general public, calling some network diagramming and topic modeling tools "just too crude for humanistic work." The lack of transparency in these programs obscures the subjective nature of the data and its processing, she argues, as these programs "generate standard diagrams based on conventional algorithms for screen display ... mak[ing] it very difficult for the semantics of the data processing to be made evident." Similar problems can be seen at a lower level, with databases used for digital humanities analysis replicating the biases of the analogue systems of data. As, essentially, "every database is a narrative" visualisations or diagrams often obscure the underlying structures or omissions of data without acknowledging that they are incomplete or present only a particular angle.

=== Diversity ===
There has also been some recent controversy among practitioners of digital humanities around the role that race and/or identity politics plays. Tara McPherson attributes some of the lack of racial diversity in digital humanities to the modality of UNIX and computers themselves. An open thread on DHpoco.org recently garnered well over 100 comments on the issue of race in digital humanities, with scholars arguing about the extent to which racial (and other) biases affect the tools and texts available for digital humanities research. McPherson posits that there needs to be an understanding and theorizing of the implications of digital technology and race, even when the subject for analysis appears not to be about race.

Amy E. Earhart criticizes what has become the new digital humanities "canon" in the shift from websites using simple HTML to the usage of the TEI and visuals in textual recovery projects. Works that have been previously lost or excluded were afforded a new home on the internet. Still, many of the same marginalizing practices found in the traditional humanities also occurred digitally. According to Earhart, there is a "need to examine the canon that we, as digital humanists, are constructing, a canon that skews toward traditional texts and excludes crucial work by women, people of color, and the LGBTQ community."

=== Issues of access ===
Practitioners in digital humanities are also failing to meet the needs of users with disabilities. George H. Williams argues that universal design is imperative for practitioners to increase usability because "many of the otherwise most valuable digital resources are useless for people who are—for example—deaf or hard of hearing, as well as for people who are blind, have low vision, or have difficulty distinguishing particular colors." To provide accessibility successfully, and productive universal design, it is important to understand why and how users with disabilities are using the digital resources while remembering that all users approach their informational needs differently.

=== Cultural criticism ===
Digital humanities have been criticized not only for ignoring traditional questions of lineage and history, but also for lacking the fundamental cultural criticism that defines the humanities. However, it remains to be seen whether the humanities must be tied to cultural criticism per se to be the humanities. Scientific fields that rely on quantitative research methods might imagine the Digital Humanities as a welcome improvement over the largely qualitative methods of other branches of the humanities and social sciences.

=== Difficulty of evaluation ===
As the field matures, there is recognition that the standard model of academic peer review may not be adequate for digital humanities projects, which often involve website components, databases, and other non-print objects. Evaluation of quality and impact thus requires a combination of old and new peer-review methods. One response has been the creation of the DHCommons Journal. This accepts non-traditional submissions, especially mid-stage digital projects, and provides an innovative peer-review model better suited to the multimedia, transdisciplinary, and milestone-driven nature of Digital Humanities projects. Other professional humanities organizations, such as the American Historical Association and the Modern Language Association, have developed guidelines for evaluating academic digital scholarship.

=== Lack of focus on pedagogy ===
The 2012 edition of Debates in the Digital Humanities acknowledged that pedagogy was the "neglected 'stepchild' of DH" and included an entire section on teaching the digital humanities. Part of the reason is that grants in the humanities are geared more toward research with quantifiable results rather than teaching innovations, which are harder to measure. In recognition of a need for more scholarship on the area of teaching, the edited volume Digital Humanities Pedagogy was published and offered case studies and strategies to address how to teach digital humanities methods in various disciplines.

== See also ==
- Cyborg anthropology
- Digital anthropology
