= Voyant Tools =

Open-source web application for text analysis

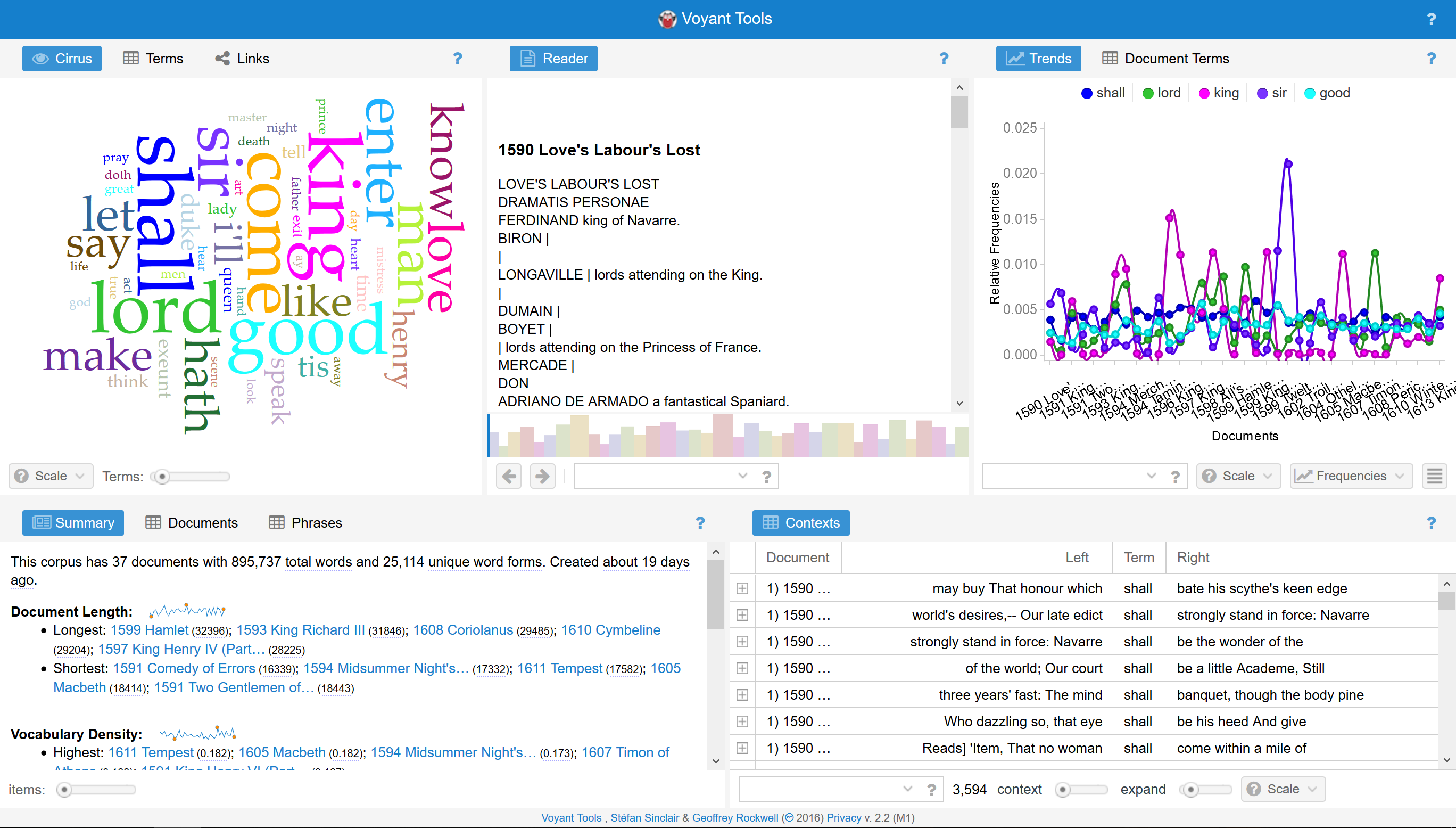
- Developers: Stéfan Sinclair & Geoffrey Rockwell
- Initial release: 2003
- Stable release: 2.2
- Operating system: Cross-platform
- Available in: 10 languages
- Type: Text analysis, statistical analysis, data mining
- Licence: Web Application: Creative Commons Attribution 4.0 International Code: GPL3
- Website: http://voyant-tools.org
- Repository: https://github.com/voyanttools/Voyant

Voyant Tools is an open-source, web-based application for performing text analysis. It supports scholarly reading and interpretation of texts or corpus, particularly by scholars in the digital humanities, but also by students and the general public. It can be used to analyze online texts or ones uploaded by users. Voyant has a large, international user base: in October 2016 alone, Voyant's main server had 81,686 page views originating from 156 countries, invoking the tool 1,173,252 times.

Voyant "was conceived to enhance reading through lightweight text analytics such as word frequency lists, frequency distribution plots, and KWIC displays." Its interface is composed of panels which perform these varied analytical tasks. These panels can be embedded in external web texts (e.g. a web article could include a Voyant panel that creates a word cloud from it). The book Hermeneutica: Computer-Assisted Interpretation in the Humanities demonstrates different approaches to text analysis using Voyant.

== History ==
Voyant Tools was developed by Stéfan Sinclair (McGill) and Geoffrey Rockwell (University of Alberta) and continues to be updated. It developed out of earlier text analysis tools including HyperPo, Taporware, and TACT. Contributors have included Andrew MacDonald, Cyril Briquet, Lisa Goddard, and Mark Turcato.

== Range of uses ==
Researchers have used Voyant Tools to analyze texts in a wide range of contexts including literature, language teaching, healthcare, and system architecture. Describing approaches to studying the internet using web scraping, Black has noted that "the Voyant Tools project is an excellent source to learn about the kinds of data that humanists can extract from Internet sources because it already supports text extraction from webpages."

A number of international digital humanities projects are running Voyant on their own servers. These include the French Huma-Num project, the Italian CNR ILC, and the German DARIAH-DE project.
