= SWiP Project =

Project for South African native languages

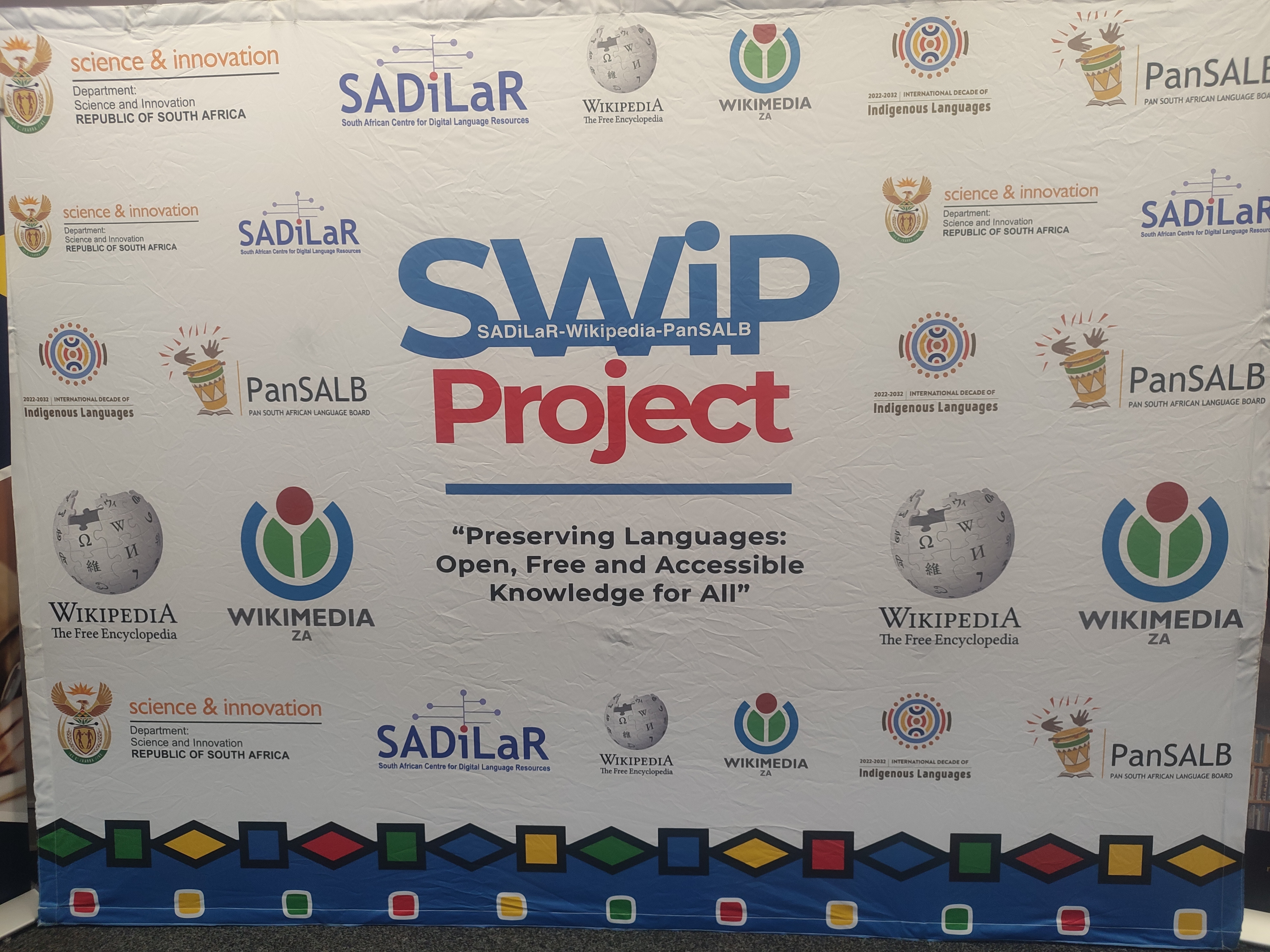
SWiP Project banner at Nelson Mandela University

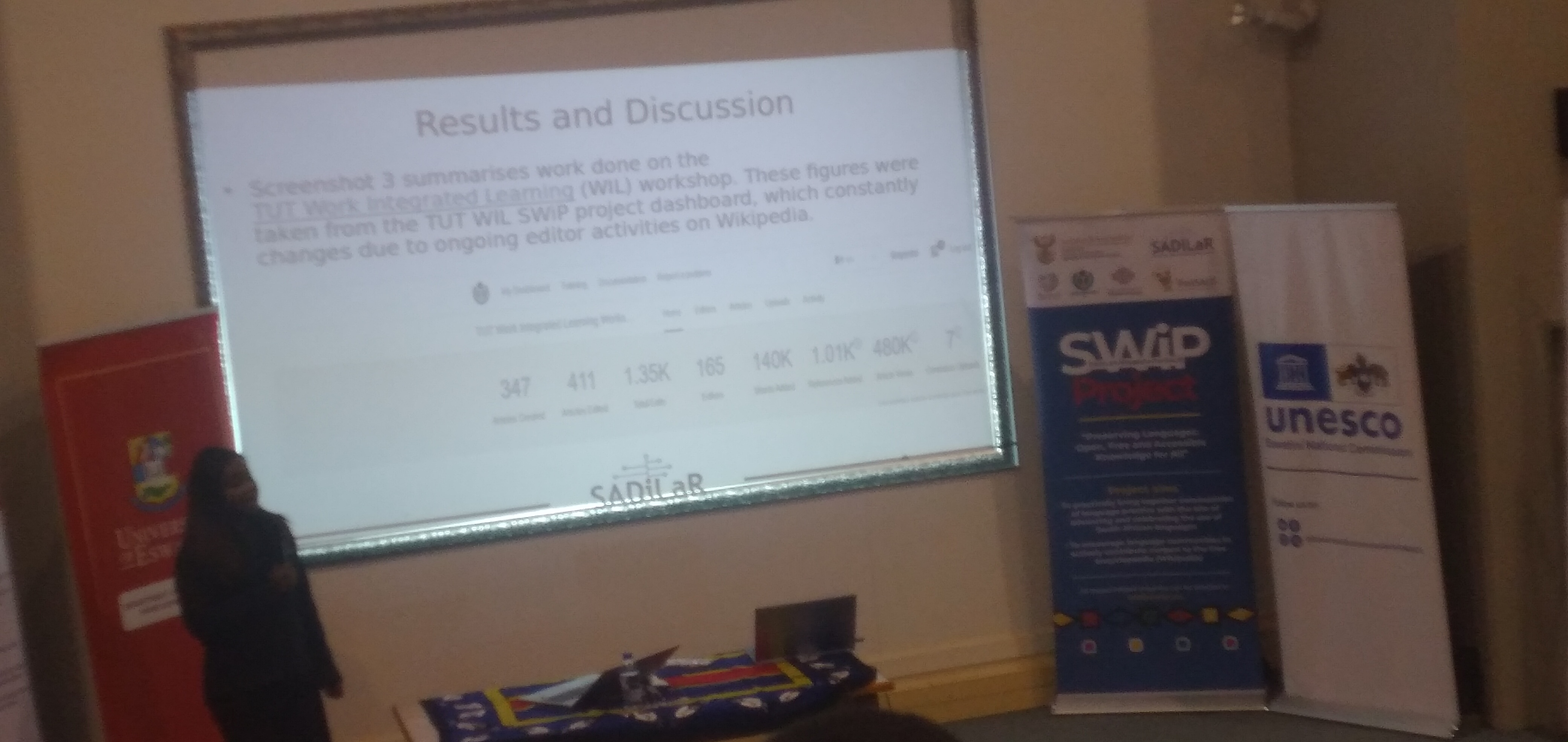
SWiP Project 2025

The SWiP project makes use of language, data and knowledge technologies to promote language equality among all of South Africa's official languages. The linguistic hegemonic status of English (and to a lesser extent Afrikaans) has resulted in English being the language of learning and teaching which downplays an African epistemology, thus local African languages are commonly under resourced. The acronym "SWiP" describes the three main partners in a national collaboration between SADiLaR, the free encyclopedia Wikipedia and PanSALB who are working alongside local speech and language communities within Academica, to address language equality using digital technologies, especially Wikipedia.

Under apartheid, certain languages were marginalised, including isiNdebele, Siswati, Xitsonga and Tshivenda. To address the underrepresentation of South Africa's indigenous languages, three organisations are collaborating to build better low-resource languages corpora. These organisations are:

- South African Centre for Digital Language Resources (SADiLaR)
- Wikimedia South Africa, (Wikipedia)
- Pan South African Language Board (PanSALB)

Wikipedia is a common source of language data for natural language processing (NLP). Low-resource languages have limited corpora of text (speech data, annotated text and other forms of linguistic data) for LLMs to draw on for NLP. The SWiP project has introduced a variety of alternative possibilities for the collection and compilation of corpora of suitable text for low-resource languages, and rolled this out on a national scale. These corpora can be used to create corpus-based dictionaries or semi-automatic translation.

This collaborative project is also intended to promote, preserve, and digitise South Africa's indigenous languages and cultural knowledge by enhancing their presence on digital platforms such as Wikipedia. By partnering with cultural and linguistic organisations, the project was designed to close the digital gap and ensure that local languages and cultural narratives are preserved and shared online.

== Outcomes ==
It is anticipated that the SWiP Project will:

- Enhance the digital presence of indigenous South African languages on platforms like Wikipedia
- Empower communities in digital content creation through training and capacity-building
- Digitise and disseminate cultural knowledge and heritage in native languages
- Foster sustainable collaboration among academic, cultural, and digital communities in South Africa.

== History ==
Phase 1 -Locations of Public Universities in South Africa that participated in SWiP

Phase 1 of the SWiP Project was launched on 20 September 2023 at UNISA with his Royal Majesty Enock Makhosoke II Mabhena, the King of amaNdebele, attending. This event launched a number of events listed below and was successfully completed. Phase 2 of the project began in November 2024 and continues through 2025 at venues such as the Nelson Mandela University, University of Mpumalanga, Mangosuthu University of Technology as well as University of Limpopo.

== Initiatives and events ==
=== IsiNdebele Wikipedia integration ===
An early success of the project was the integration of isiNdebele into Wikipedia. Initially represented by only 11 articles in the Wikipedia Incubator, the language saw rapid growth to over 140 articles within a year (as of 29 May 2025, there are 180 articles), marking its transition to Wikipedia's main platform.

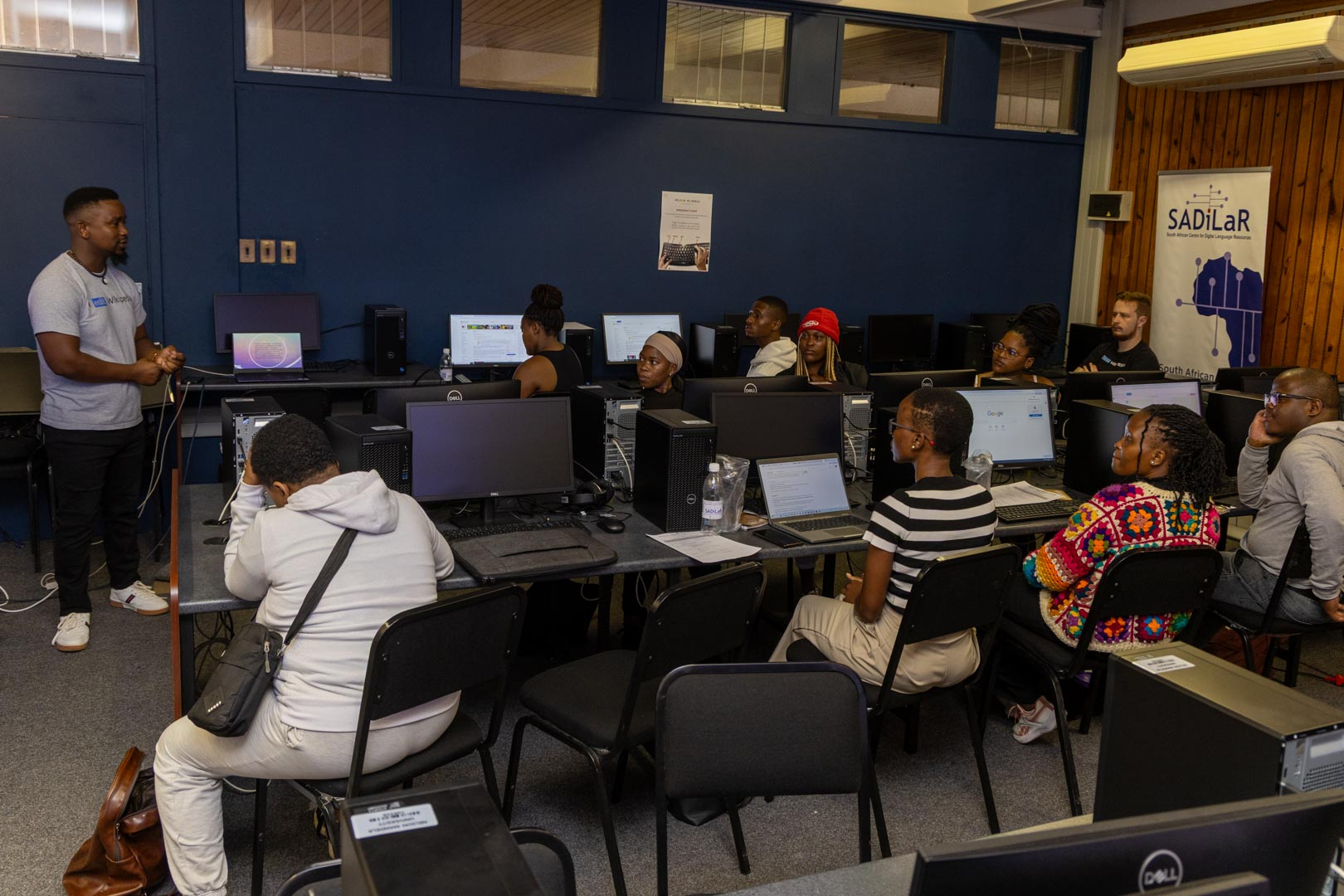
SWiP Project workshop at Nelson Mandela University

=== Community training and engagement ===
The project has conducted extensive training sessions, engaging over 300 participants from various South African universities. Trainers introduced academics to Wikipedia and they learned article authorship skills (add content, citations, and photographs) and practiced translation using the Wikipedia translation tool.

These sessions led to the creation of hundreds of new articles, thousands of edits, and significant contributions of written content, references, and multimedia. The initiatives have fostered digital literacy and community engagement while significantly enhancing Wikipedia's indigenous language content.

== Impact and achievements ==
Since its inception, the SWiP Project has:

- Expanded Digital Content – Hundreds of new Wikipedia articles have been created in indigenous languages.
- Preserved Cultural Narratives – The project has ensured that cultural stories, languages, and traditions are accessible to global audiences.
- Empowered Communities – Through training sessions and collaborative workshops, over 300 participants have become active digital content creators.
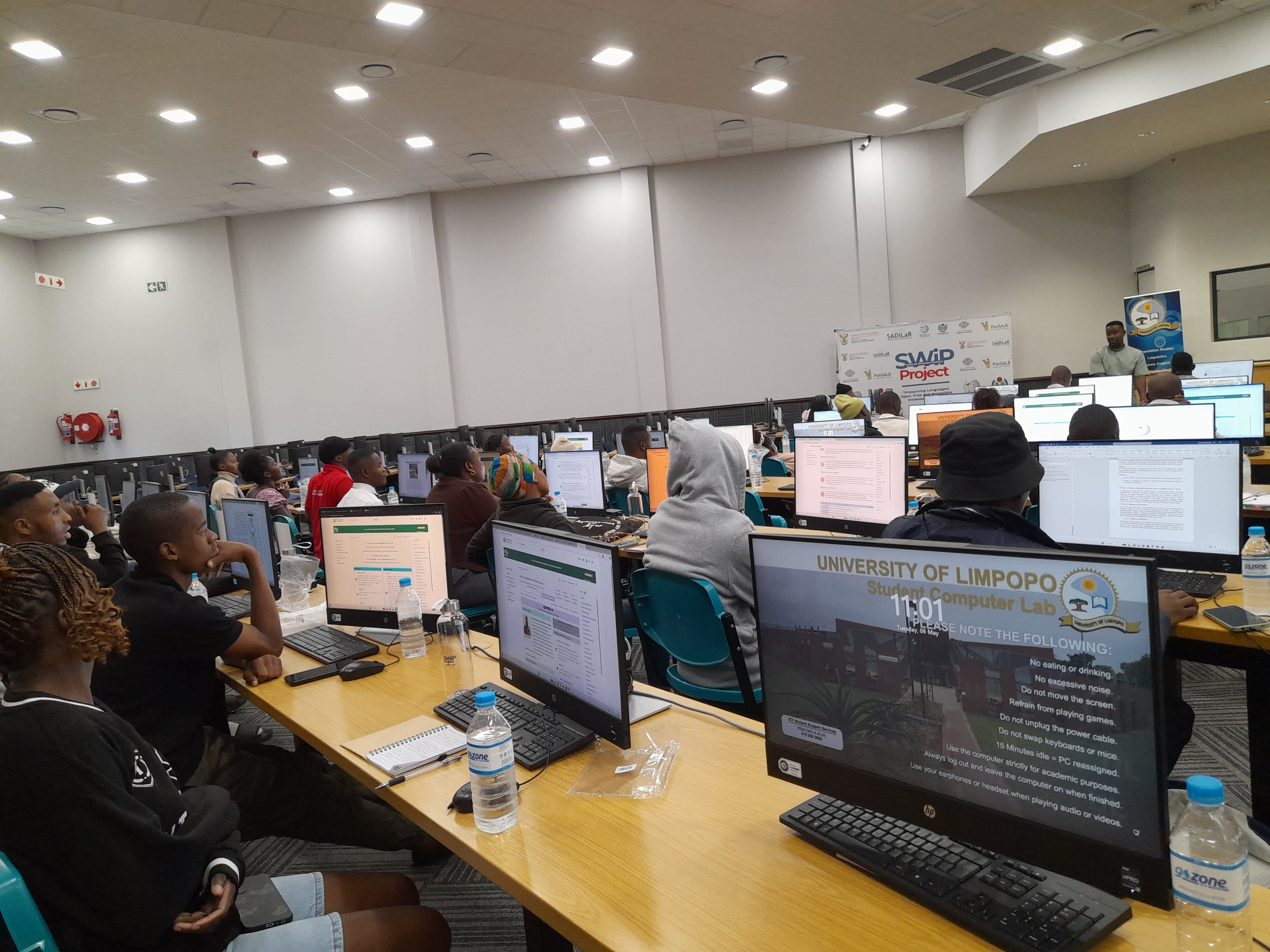
- Swip Project in progress at the University of Limpopo
  Enhanced Visibility – The newly created content has collectively amassed millions of views, signifying a broad digital reach.

Dashboard from SWip Phase 2 at the University of Mpumalanga

Dashboard from the SWip Phase 2 at the University of Limpopo .

== SWiP Resource Page ==
The SWiP Resource Page is accessible to anyone interested in learning how to edit Wikipedia.
