= SADiLaR =

South African Digital Language Resources, a DSI sponsored organisation

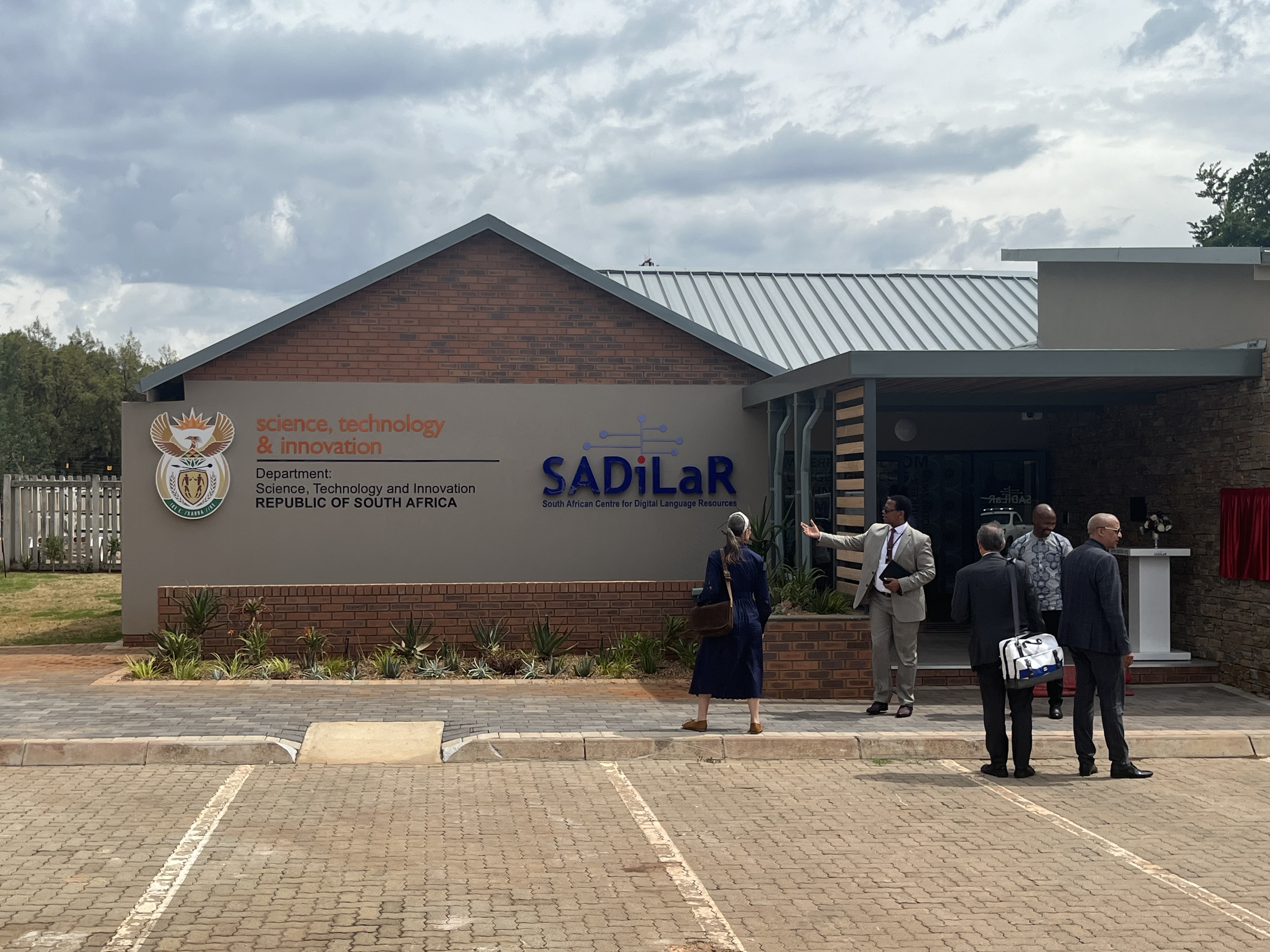
- Formation: 2016; 10 years ago
- Headquarters: Building A7, 15 College Ave North-West University, Potchefstroom, South Africa
- Executive Director: Prof Langa Khumalo
- Website: https://sadilar.org/en/

SADiLaR (the South African Centre for Digital Language Resources), is a Department of Science and Innovation sponsored initiative to create and manage digital resources and software supporting research and development in digital language resources in South Africa.

== Vision and mission ==
SADiLaR is focussed on preserving and advancing South Africa's under-resourced indigenous language. They wish to promote a digital future for all South Africans, irrespective of their language background. This is enabled by stimulating and enabling digital research and development into vernacular languages and they share these language resources freely.

== History ==
Founded in 2016, and hosted at the North-West University, SADiLaR aims to provide a resource centre that simulates, enables, manages and distributes digital research related to all of South Africa's official languages. It functions both as host and as a hub for a number of nodes, including other universities, research centres and public archives.

== Nodes ==
The nodes that are linked to SADiLaR include;

- CSIR (HLT Research Group)
- Inter-institutional Centre for Language Development and Assessment (ICELDA)
- North-West University (Centre for Text Technology)
- Stellenbosch University (Child Language Development)
- University of Pretoria (Department of African Languages)
- University of South Africa (Department of African Languages)

== DH-OER ==
SADiLaR launched the DH-OER Champions project to stimulate activism and research around the use and/or creation of OER for the digital humanities (DH) at universities in South Africa. The inaugural DH-OER cohort offered stakeholders the opportunity observe how the various open champions (academics, researchers, and students) from other disciplines, institutions, and regions in South Africa (and beyond) can make use of OER in their disciplines. The results of these DH OER projects are listed on the Educator Track page on the SADiLaR site.

== Higher education support ==
SADiLaR are engaged in the systematic creation of relevant digital text, speech and multimodal resources.

== Collaborations ==
SADiLaR is involved in a collaboration between Wikipedia and the Pan South African Language Board. Together they launched the SWiP collaboration at the University of South Africa in September 2023. SWiP advocates for equality among all indigenous languages and encouraging languages communities in South Africa to become more visible on Wikipedia and post information in their own language.
