= Lisa Samuels =

American poet and academic in New Zealand

Academic background
- Education: University of Virginia, University of North Carolina at Chapel Hill
- Thesis: Poetic Arrest: Laura Riding, Wallace Stevens, and the Modernist Afterlife (1997)

Lisa Nell Samuels is an American–New Zealand experimental poet and academic, and a professor emerita at the University of Auckland. She has published a number of books of poetry, an experimental novel, and adapted one poem into a soundscape and a short film.

== Academic career ==
Samuels completed a Bachelor of Arts in English at the University of North Carolina at Chapel Hill, followed by a Master of Arts and a PhD titled Poetic Arrest: Laura Riding, Wallace Stevens, and the Modernist Afterlife at the University of Virginia. Samuels completed visiting fellowships at the University of Alabama and University of Louisville, before taking a position at Eastern Michigan University. In 2000 she moved to University of Wisconsin–Milwaukee, where she spent six years and achieved tenure, before moving to New Zealand. Samuels joined the faculty of the University of Auckland in 2006, as professor in the Faculty of Arts, English and Drama.

Samuels has published a number of books of poetry, as well as 2015 experimental novel Tender girl. Samuels' 2009 book Tomorrowland has been adapted into a CD soundscape and a film, directed by Wes Tank.

Her 2017 book of poetry, Symphony for Human Transport, was listed as one of the Guardian's top books of poetry in 2017. Poetry editor Carol Rumens described the poem sequence as "somewhat metaphysical in character...There are many doors in these poems, and many perspectives bathed in haunting, changing light."

In 2009, Samuels' poetry featured alongside that of Tusiata Avia, James Milne, Jeffery McCaleb and Michael White in a poster campaign, plastering poems around 13 New Zealand locations and in Nashville, Tennessee.

== Selected works ==
=== Books ===
- A Transpacific Poetics 2017 200 pages Litmus Press
- Symphony for Human Transport 2017 76 pages
- Tender girl: A novel 2015 192 pages Dusie
- Over hear: Six types of poetry experiment in Aotearoa-New Zealand 2015 (45 pages) Tinfish Press
- Gender City. June 2010. Shearsman Books. ISBN 978-1848611696
- Imagining What We Don't Know: Creative Theory and Critical Bodies. 2026. Punctum Books.

=== Journal articles ===
- Lisa Samuels (1997). "Introduction to Poetry and the Problem of Beauty". Modern Language Studies. 27 (2): 1. doi:10.2307/3195342. Wikidata Q126446787.
- Lisa Samuels (1997). "Eight Justifications for Canonizing Lyn Hejinian's "My Life"". Modern Language Studies. 27 (2): 103. doi:10.2307/3195353. Wikidata Q126446782.
