= Index Thomisticus =

Digital humanities project

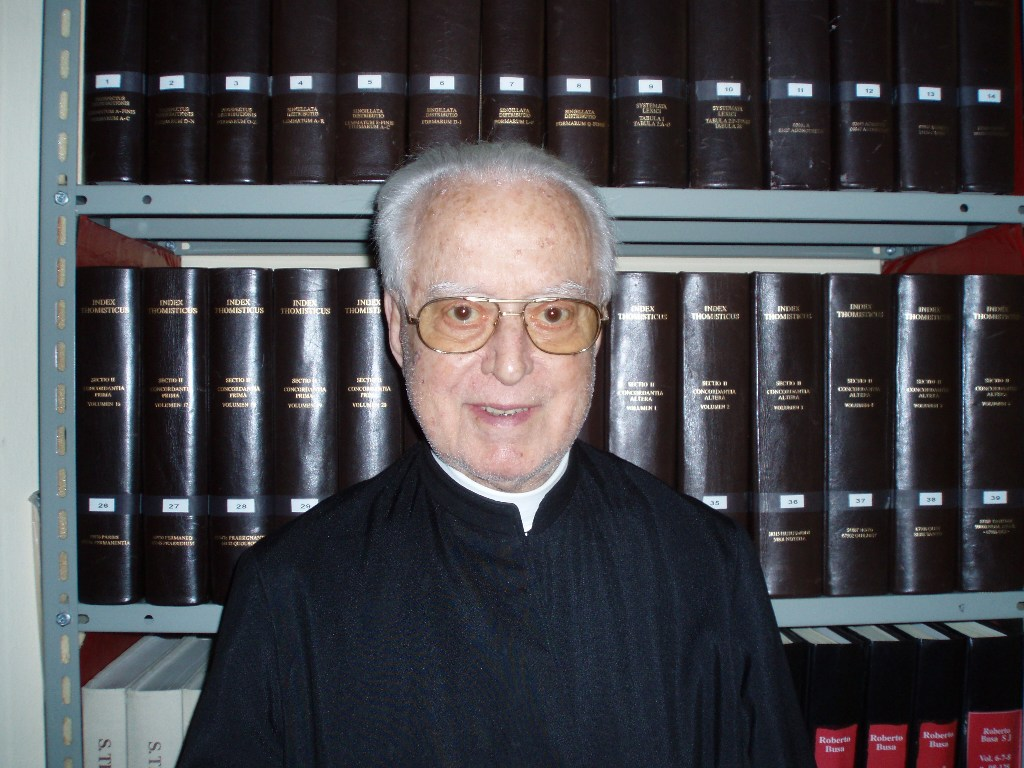
Roberto Busa (2006); in the background, the Index Thomisticus

The Index Thomisticus was a digital humanities project begun in the 1940s that created a concordance to 179 texts centering around Thomas Aquinas. Led by Roberto Busa, the project indexed 10,631,980 words over the course of 34 years, initially onto punched cards. It is considered a pioneering project in the field of digital humanities.

== Project ==
Busa began the project in 1946. In 1949, IBM agreed to sponsor the project until its completion. They assigned Paul Tasman, an executive at the company, to work with Busa. Busa selected 179 texts centering around Thomas Aquinas that would be put into a form that was machine-readable. 118 of the works were written by Aquinas, and the remaining 61 items were either at one point mis-attributed to him or an attempt to complete an unfinished work begun by Aquinas.

A significant part of the project was the data entry, which was meticulously carried out by a team of female keypunch operators. Their dedication and precision were instrumental in the success of the project. This work of punching the text was made between 1950 and 1966. They worked in Gallarate, Italy, and the project peaked in size in 1962 with 70 workers. After the punching was complete, the data was lemmatised in a semi-automatic process.

The completed project indexed a total of 10,631,980 words in fifty-six volumes over 70,000 pages—divided into ten volumes of indexes, followed by thirty-one volumes of concordances of Aquinas's works, eight volumes of concordances of related authors, and seven volumes that reprinted the source texts. The seven completely reprinting the source texts were sold separately. The first volume was published in 1974, and publication was completed in 1980. The project used a total of 1,500 kilometres (930 mi) of tape and it took an estimated 10,000 hours of computer work and 1 million hours of human work to complete. The Index was released on CD-ROM in 1992 and a website was launched in 2005. In 2026, a new version of the website—developed by Enrique Alarcón and Daniele Di Salvo—was released; it integrates new research tools, including it-parser, it-analyzer, and it-graph, thereby expanding the Index Thomisticus's capabilities for text analysis and exploration.

== Reception, impact, and legacy ==
A review published of the project in Computers and the Humanities described it as "as innovative and fascinating a reference work as the technology that made it possible." In 1993, the project was described as the "second largest printed work of this century". The same review called it "excessive" and asked what its purpose was, going on to describe it as "the most pedantic work ever written". In 2020, The Economist described it as "the creation story of the digital humanities." An article in Umanistica Digitale wrote that "the project developed for the first time, methods for dealing with unstructured language". It influenced projects such as Key Word in Context. The project is also sometimes listed as one of the earliest instances of an e-book.

== Bibliography ==
- Burton, Dolores (1984). "Review of Index Thomisticus: Sancti Thomae Aquinatis operum omnium indices et concordantiae; Sancti Thomae Aquinatis opera omnia". Computers and the Humanities. 18 (2): 109–120. doi:10.1007/BF02274166. ISSN 0010-4817. JSTOR 30200002. S2CID 29640298.
- IBM Data Processing Division (1973). "Jesuit Father Uses Computer to Analyze Works of St. Thomas Aquinas" (PDF). Modern Data. 6 (9): 39–40. ISSN 0026-7678.
- Rockwell, Geoffrey; Passarotti, Marco (2019-05-27). "The Index Thomisticus as a Big Data Project". Umanistica Digitale (5). doi:10.6092/issn.2532-8816/8575. ISSN 2532-8816.
- Nyhan, Julianne (2023). Hidden and Devalued Feminized Labour in the Digital Humanities : On the Index Thomisticus Project 1954-67. Routledge, Taylor & Francis group. ISBN 9780367685980.
