= Roberto Busa =

Italian Jesuit and computational linguist (1913–2011)

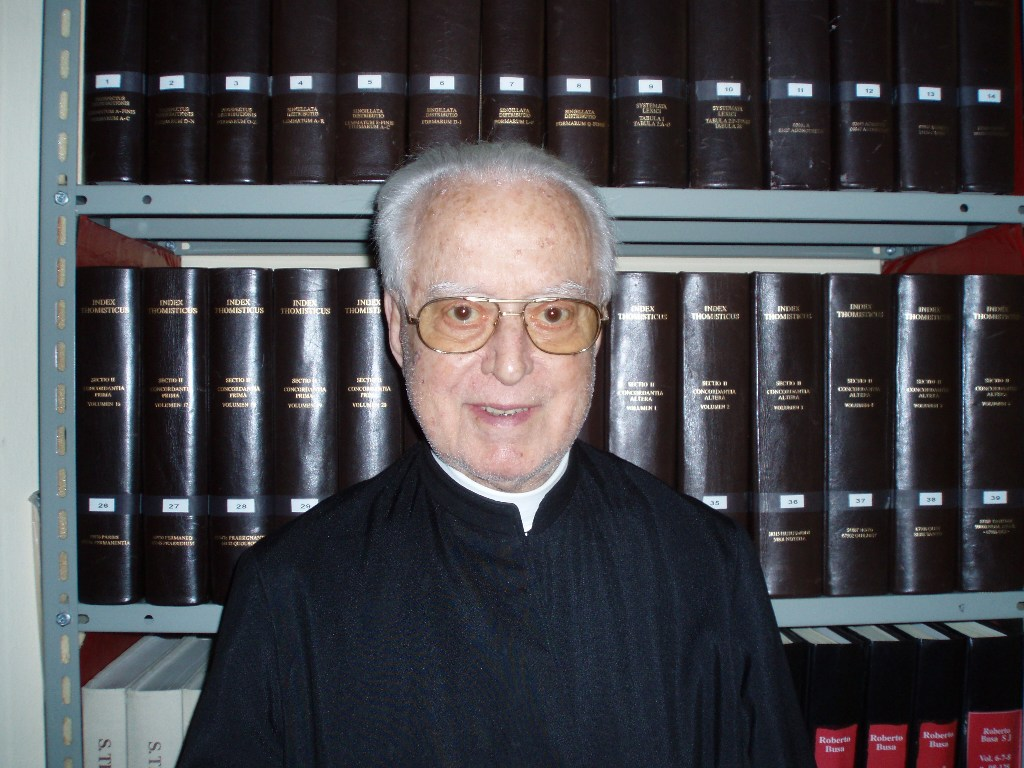
Busa in 2006, standing in front of his Index Thomisticus

Roberto Busa SJ (November 28, 1913 – August 9, 2011) was an Italian Jesuit priest and one of the pioneers in the usage of computers for linguistic and literary analysis. He was the author of the Index Thomisticus, a complete lemmatization of the works of philosopher Saint Thomas Aquinas and of a few related authors.

== Biography ==
Born in Vicenza, the second of five children, he attended primary school in Bolzano and grammar school in Verona and in Belluno. In 1928 he entered the Episcopal Seminary of Belluno, completing high school there, and took the first two-year course of Theology with Albino Luciani, the future Pope John Paul I. In 1933 he joined the Society of Jesus, where he got a diploma in Philosophy in 1937 and one in Theology in 1941 and where he was ordained priest in 1940. From 1940 to 1943 he was an auxiliary army chaplain in the National Army and later in the partisan forces. In 1946 he graduated in philosophy at the Papal Gregorian University of Rome with a degree thesis entitled "The Thomistic Terminology of Interiority", which was published in 1949. He was full professor of Ontology, Theodicy and Scientific Methodology and, for some years, a librarian in the "Aloisianum" Faculty of Philosophy of Gallarate.

== Index Thomisticus ==
In 1946 he planned the Index Thomisticus, as a tool for performing text searches within the massive corpus of Aquinas's works. In 1949 he met with Thomas J. Watson, the founder of IBM, and was able to persuade him to sponsor the Index Thomisticus. The project lasted about 30 years, and eventually produced in the 1970s the 56 printed volumes of the Index Thomisticus. In 1989, a CD-ROM version was produced. In addition, in 2005 a web-based version made its debut, sponsored by the Fundación Tomás de Aquino and CAEL; the design and programming of this version were carried about by E. Alarcón and E. Bernot, in collaboration with Busa. In 2006 the Index Thomisticus Treebank project (directed by Marco Passarotti) started the syntactic annotation of the entire corpus. In 2026, a new version of the website—developed by Enrique Alarcón and Daniele Di Salvo—was released; it integrates new research tools, including it-parser, it-analyzer, and it-graph, thereby expanding the Index Thomisticus's capabilities for text analysis and exploration.

== The Busa Prize ==
The Alliance of Digital Humanities Organizations (ADHO) awards the "Busa Prize", which honors leaders in the field of humanities computing. The first Busa Prize was awarded in 1998 to Busa himself. Later winners include:

- John Burrows (Australia) (presented in 2001, New York, New York, USA)
- Susan Hockey (UK) (presented in 2004, Gothenburg, Sweden)
- Wilhelm Ott (Germany) (2007, Champaign-Urbana, Illinois, USA)
- Joseph Raben (USA) (2010, King's College London, UK)
- Willard McCarty (UK) (2013, Lincoln, Nebraska, USA)
- Helen Agüera (USA) (2016, Kraków, Poland)
- Tito Orlandi (Italy) (2019, Utrecht, Netherlands)
- Susan Irene Brown (Canada) (2024, Arlington, Virginia, USA)

== Later projects ==
Before his death, Busa had been teaching at the Papal Gregorian University in Rome, at the "Aloisianum" Faculty of Philosophy in Gallarate, and at the Catholic Sacred Heart University in Milan. He was also working at the Lessico Tomistico Biculturale (Bicultural Thomistic Lexicon) project, which aims at understanding the Latin concepts used by Thomas Aquinas in the terms of contemporary culture. A selection of his works has been collected and translated by Julianne Nyhan and Marco Passarotti.
