= Chris Joseph (writer/artist) =

British-Canadian multimedia writer and artist

Chris Joseph is British/Canadian multimedia writer and artist who also creates work under the name 'babel'. He was born in Bury St Edmunds, Suffolk and now lives in Berlin.

He has collaborated with novelist Kate Pullinger on several projects, including 'The Breathing Wall' (2004), a novel that responds to the reader's breathing rate; the series of interactive multimedia stories 'Inanimate Alice' (2005, ongoing); and 'Flight Paths' (2007, ongoing), a "networked novel" created via the internet in collaboration with worldwide participants. He is editor of the post-dada magazine and network 391.org, and was a member of the Transliteracy Research Group based in De Montfort University, Leicester, UK, researching the concepts and practice of transliteracy and he has published a number of academic articles in partnership with other researchers. From 2006 to 2008 he was the first Digital Writer in Residence at the Institute of Creative Technologies in De Montfort University.

Since 2010 he has also worked as the sound designer and composer on a number of collaborations with Australian writer Mez Breeze and UK artist/programmer Andy Campbell, including 'synthetic reality game' #PRISOM and transmedia project 'All the Delicate Duplicates' (formerly 'Pluto') which was the winner of The Space Tumblr international Prize in Digital Art in 2015, and won Best Overall Game at GameCity Open Arcade in October 2016, such as Transliteracy: Crossing Divides (2007) and Aesthetics of a robot: Case study on aibo dog robots for buddy-ing devices (2014)

In 2016 he appeared as the character 'Willy Wright' in the thriller film Redistributors, by UK director Adrian Tanner.
