= Kate Pullinger =

Canadian novelist and author of digital fiction, and a Professor of Creative Writing

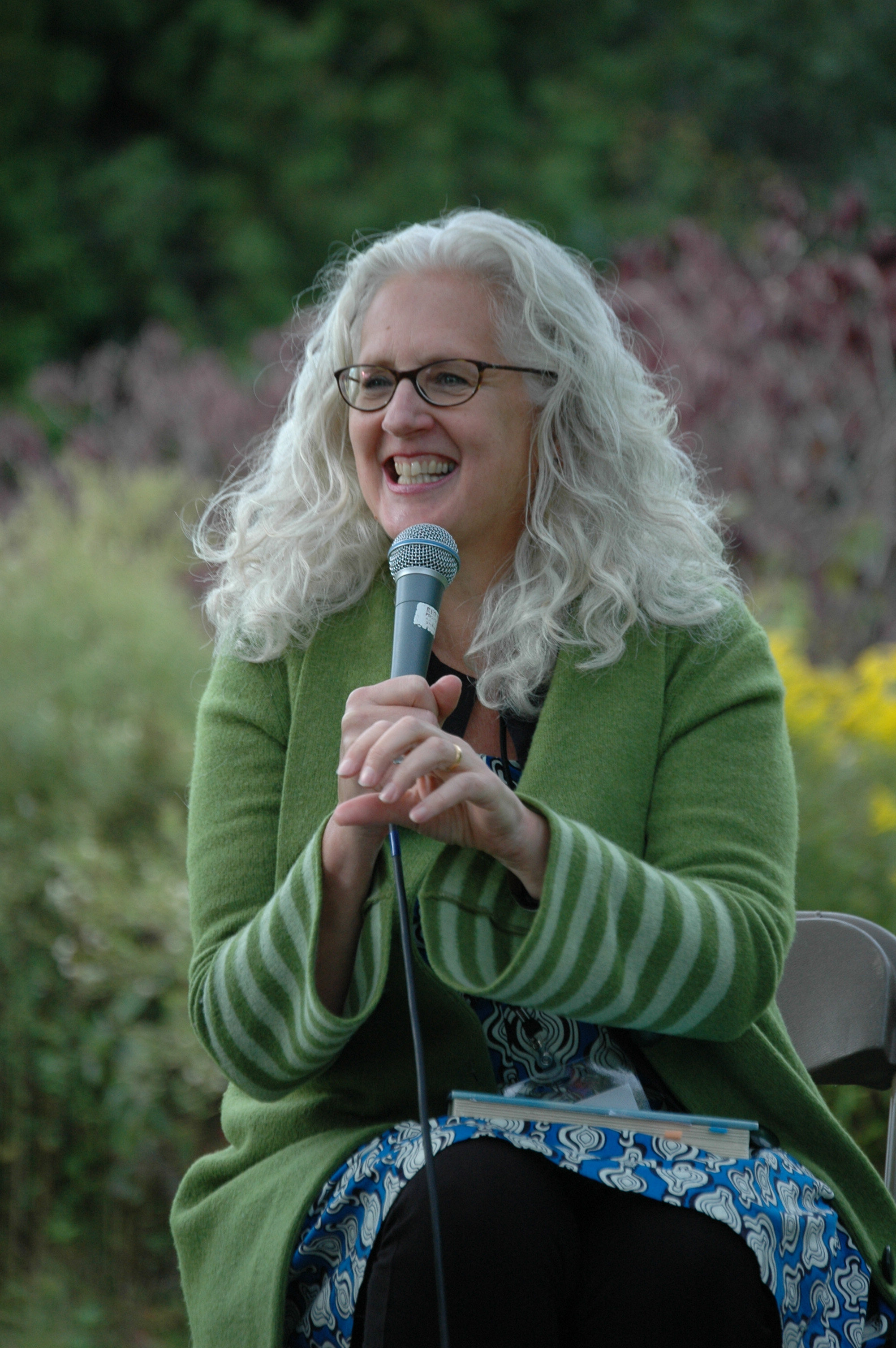
Pullinger at the Eden Mills Writers' Festival in 2014

Kate Pullinger is a Canadian novelist and author of digital fiction, and a professor of Creative Writing at Bath Spa University, England.

== Early life and education ==
She was born 1961 in Cranbrook, British Columbia, Canada, and went to high school on Vancouver Island. She dropped out of McGill University, Montreal, after a year and a half.

== Career ==
Pullinger worked for a year in a copper mine in the Yukon. She then travelled and settled in London, where she now resides.

Pullinger has been writer-in-residence at the Battersea Arts Centre, the University of Reading, the prisons HMP Gartree and HMP Maidstone, and in Maidstone itself. She was Judith E. Wilson Visiting Writing Fellow at Jesus College, University of Cambridge (1995/96), and the Visiting Writing Fellow at The Women's Library, London Metropolitan University (2001/03). She was Research Fellow for The trAce Online Writing Centre Arts and Humanities Research Board project Mapping the Transition from Page to Screen, where she investigated new forms of electronic narrative (2002/03). She taught on the MA in Creative Writing and New Media at De Montfort University, Leicester, UK, where she was Reader in Creative Writing and New Media. She is a member of the Production and Research in Transliteracy (PART) group at De Montfort, researching transliteracy. She is the Royal Literary Fund Virtual Fellow and Professor of Creative Writing at Bath Spa University.

Pullinger is an atheist.

== Writing ==
Pullinger's earlier books include the novels When the Monster Dies (1989), Where Does Kissing End? (1992), The Last Time I Saw Jane (1996), Weird Sister (1999) and A Little Stranger (2004 in Canada and 2006 in the UK), as well as the short-story collections Tiny Lies (1988) and My Life as a Girl in a Men's Prison (1997). She co-wrote the novelization of the film The Piano (1993) with director Jane Campion.

== Electronic literature ==
George Landow examined Kate Pullinger's and Talan Memmott's 2003 animated poem, Branded, in his 2006 textbook, Hypertext 3.0. He explains that this poem moves text on screen one line at a time, for a computer-driven timed reading.

Pullinger also writes for film and for the digital media. Her most recent digital works are Flight Paths (2007–), a "networked novel" created in collaboration with worldwide participants, and Inanimate Alice (2005–), a series of multimedia novels, both created with writer/artist Chris Joseph, and The Breathing Wall (2004), experimental fiction that responds to the reader's rate of breathing, made with collaborators Stefan Schemat and Chris Joseph.

Pullinger was the lead writer on the 24hr Book Project, a project to write, edit and produce a novel in 24 hours, which was managed by CompletelyNovel.com in collaboration with if:book (a book industry think tank), the Society of Young Publishers and Spread the Word (a writer development agency).

Pullinger's digital literature work is preserved in the NEXT Museum, Library, and Preservation Space, and Agnieszka Przybyszewska (University of Łódź) and Mariusz Pisarski describe the challenges involved in this preservation effort.

Breathe was exhibited at the MIX 2023: Storytelling in Immersive Media at the British Library.

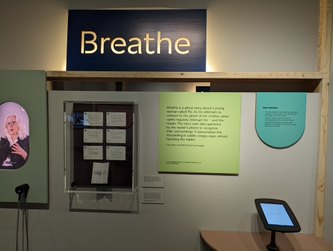
Breathe at the British Library in 2023

== Awards and honours ==
Pullinger won the 2009 Governor General's Award for her novel The Mistress of Nothing, a fictionalized tale of Sally Naldrett, lady's maid to Lady Duff Gordon, who traveled with her mistress to Egypt in Victorian times.

She received the 2021 Electronic Literature Organization's Marjorie C. Luesebrink Career Achievement Award for her work to bridge print and digital fiction.

Pullinger was elected a Fellow of the Royal Society of Literature in 2024.

== Selected bibliography ==
=== Novels ===
- — (1990). When the Monster Dies. Picador. ISBN 978-0-330-31398-8. OCLC 877427631.
- — (1994). The Piano. Miramax/Hyperion. ISBN 978-0-7868-6121-7. OCLC 1321448902.
- — (1997). The Last Time I Saw Jane. Phoenix. ISBN 978-1-85799-864-1. OCLC 717313020.
- — (2000). Weird Sister. Phoenix. ISBN 978-0-7538-1064-4. OCLC 48238032.
- — (2007). A Little Stranger. Serpent's Tail. ISBN 978-1-85242-487-9. OCLC 254784698.
- — (2014). The Mistress of Nothing. Anchor Canada. ISBN 978-0-385-68254-1. OCLC 909084525.
- — (2015). Landing Gear. Touchstone. ISBN 978-1-4767-5321-8. OCLC 911389823.
- — (2021). Forest Green. Anchor Canada. ISBN 978-0-385-68306-7. OCLC 1110578573.

=== Hypertexts ===
- 2005–2018. Inanimate Alice.
- 2007. A Million Penguins.

=== Short stories ===
- — (1989). Tiny Lies. Picador. ISBN 978-0-224-02560-7. OCLC 741252252.
- (1995). How Maxine Learned to Love her Legs: And Other Tales of Growing Up. ISBN 978-0-9515877-4-4
- — (1998). My Life as a Girl in a Men's Prison. Phoenix House. ISBN 978-0-7538-0134-5. OCLC 38884343.
