= Alan Y. Liu =

American literary scholar (born 1953)

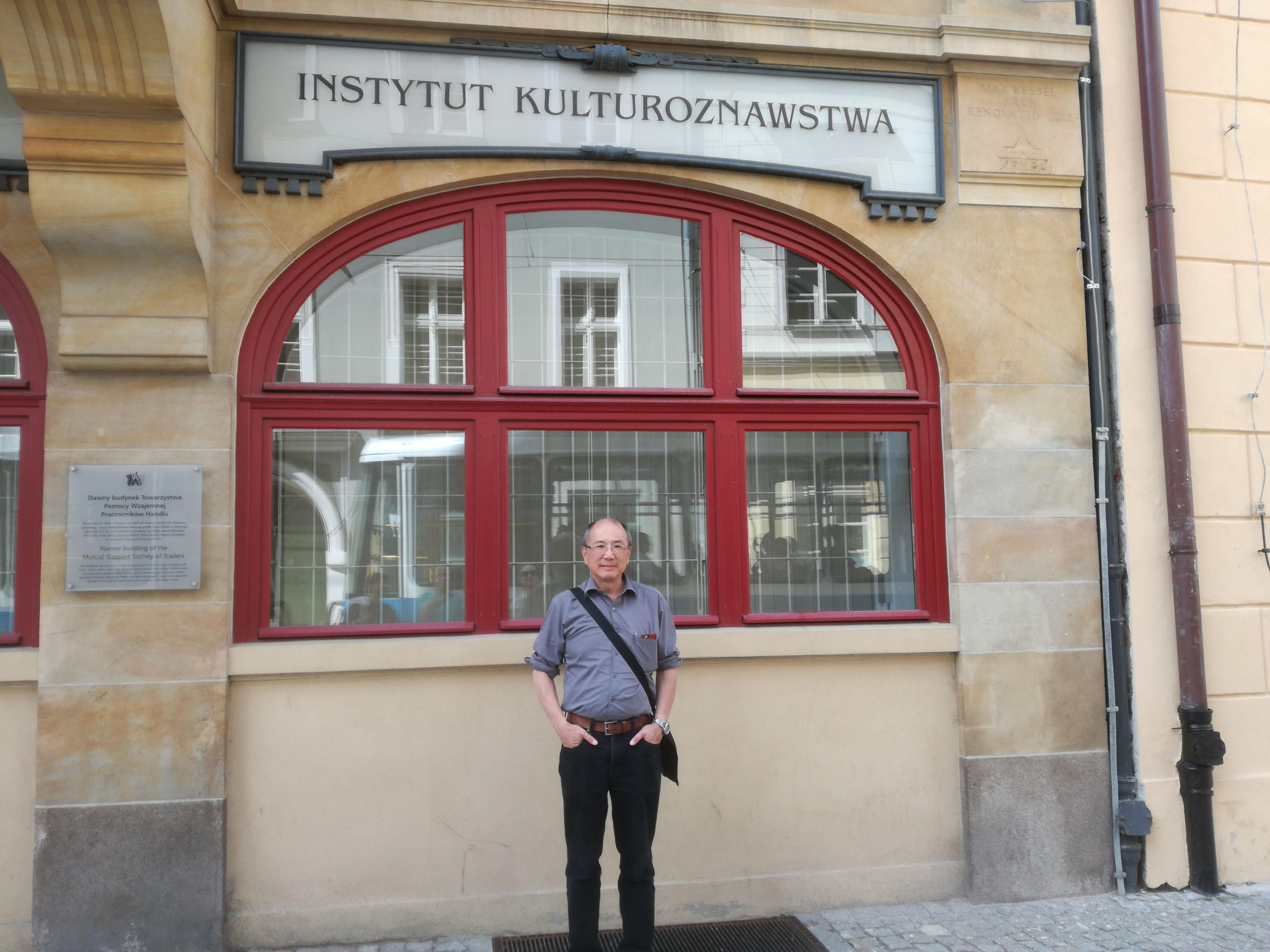
- Alan Liu stands in front of the Instytut Kulturoznawstwa at the Uniwersytet Wrocławski, Poland in 2017.
- Born: 1953 (age 72–73); United States
- Occupation: Professor

Academic background
- Education: Yale University, Stanford University
- Alma mater: Stanford University
- Doctoral advisor: Herbert Lindenberger
- Other advisors: Anne K. Mellor, W.B. Carnochan

Academic work
- Discipline: English
- Sub-discipline: Romanticism, Digital Humanities
- Institutions: University of California, Santa Barbara
- Doctoral students: Rita Raley, Lisa Swanstrom

Alan Y. Liu (born 1953) is an American literary scholar of British Romantic literature and art, digital humanities, and science and technology studies, and a Distinguished Professor of English at the University of California, Santa Barbara, where he is also affiliate faculty in Media Arts & Technology and Comparative Literature.

He is the co-founder and co-president of the Center for Humanities Communication, has served on the board of directors for the Electronic Literature Organization, and was a former president of the Wordsworth-Coleridge Association. He was founder and creator of Voice of the Shuttle, considered "one of the first and most important indexes of web content related to the humanities."

== Education ==
Liu received a BA in English from Yale University, an MA in Creative Writing from Stanford, and a PhD from Stanford University.

== Career ==
Alan Liu was faculty at Yale University from 1979 to 1987, before moving to the University of California, Santa Barbara in 1995.

In 1994, in the early days of the internet, Liu started Voice of the Shuttle (VoS), a "Web page for humanities research," which indexed humanities-related content on the internet before that content was made easily discoverable via search engines. Liu writes that in 1994, his intent was to "seduce my community onto the Internet." It began as a local project that grew to global prominence, logging "sizable user communities from Italy, Australia, New Zealand, Japan, Mexico, and several other countries (plus a constant stream of first-time visitors from all over)." This led to "mirror" sites emerging in numerous other locations. It would later be recognized in the popular press, including Forbes, Los Angeles Times, New York Times, and others. In 1996, Steven Henry Madoff of in The New York Times noted that VoS was "an astonishingly deep resource, covering every aspect of the art world." Liu would later call this project a "boundary object," as theorized by Susan Leigh Star, and write of it: "It was a sunrise, and sunset, boundary object spanning disciplinary and geographical scholarly communities in hopes of creating a global collaborative in which humanists (and the public) could freely take and add knowledge across their divisions."

In 2005, he founded the Transliteracies Research Project, an early example of a multi-campus digital project, which examined the evolution of reading and reading technologies. Suzana Sukovic writes that the concept of "transliteracy" as employed in the digital humanities was based on the work started by Liu and the Transliteracies Project.

Also in 2005, Liu established The Agrippa Files, a digital project that sought to create an online archive of William Gibson's ephemeral art book Agrippa (A Book of the Dead). According to Lisa Swanstrom, this project marked a significant moment in the afterlife of the original Agrippa. Quinn DuPont, who later ran a challenge to crack the code of Agrippa, notes that this project demonstrated the potential of cryptography within digital humanities.

Since then, Liu has become a prominent figure in the field of digital humanities. His scholarship has been foundational to the field, and important in critiquing it as it has become more institutionalized. Stephen Ramsay summarizes Liu's criticism of the field made in his famous essay, "Where is the Cultural Criticism in the Digital Humanities?" as demanding "that digital humanities develop a sense of awareness and self-reflection about its own activity using the existing frameworks of critical theory and cultural studies."

== Legacy ==
Voice of the Shuttle, one of his earliest digital projects, is now considered "one of the first and most important indexes of web content related to the humanities."

In a 2013 introduction to an interview with Liu, aModern journal described him as "an engineer of the humanities" who "has engineered a series of enabling hacks on humanities methodologies that have changed the way scholars understand humanities research."

== Works ==
=== Books ===
- Critical Infrastructure Studies and Digital Humanities. Co-edited with Urszula Pawlicka-Deger, and James Smithies. (2026)
- Friending the Past: The Sense of History in the Digital (2018)
- Local Transcendence: Essays on Postmodern Historicism and the Database (2008)
- The Laws of Cool: Knowledge Work and the Culture of Information (2004)
- Wordsworth: The Sense of History (1989)
- William Wordsworth, Poetry for Young People Series (2003) (48 pp.) Editor, illustrations by James Mu.

=== Digital Humanities Projects ===
- Voice of the Shuttle
- The Agrippa Files
- Transliteracies Project
- Research-Oriented Social Environment (RoSE)
- 4Humanities
