= All the Delicate Duplicates =

2017 video game

- Developers: Mez Breeze; Andy Campbell
- Publisher: N/A
- Producers: The Space; One to One Development Trust - Dreaming Methods; Mez Breeze Design
- Composer: Chris Joseph
- Engine: Unity
- Platform: Microsoft Windows
- Release: WW: February 18, 2017
- Genre: Psychological/Exploration Game
- Mode: Single-player

All the Delicate Duplicates is a single player first-person psychological/exploration game co-developed by Mez Breeze and Andy Campbell. Produced by The Space, One to One Development Trust - Dreaming Methods, and Mez Breeze Design, the game was published for Microsoft Windows in February 2017. It contains a non-linear story that's discovered through interactive elements and a text-based backstory.

== Themes ==
Originally slated as a transmedia project called "Pluto", All the Delicate Duplicates now has at its core a 3D gameworld. This gameworld blurs fantasy and the real world in a set of environments that question concepts of time, multiple realities, family dynamics, and quantum states, playing on the fact that perception is a crucial aspect of how we construct (what we know as) reality.

Inspired by the possibilities of fiction, digital poetry and experimental digital art, All the Delicate Duplicates tells a complex psychological story through game engine technology. Developed from the ground up by digital artists/writers rather than traditional game developers, the work challenges traditional storytelling within games by spanning multiple time periods, incorporating animated and transitional texts as physical manifestations within the gameworld and leaving the story open to multiple revisits and interpretations.

The poetic, hybrid language Mezangelle forms a central part of the non-linear language in the game. It remixes the basic structure of English and computer code to create language where meanings are nested inside each other. Players need to read and re-read in order to piece together the narrative.

== Plot ==
When single parent/computer engineer John inherits a collection of arcane objects, journals and sketches from an enigmatic relative named Mo, he confines them to his loft. Seeking inspiration for her school art class, John's daughter Charlotte accidentally uncovers these objects and journals, latching on to Mo's wild, surreal creativity and bizarre scientific theories with childlike obsession and wonder. Charlotte bombards John (who confesses he cannot remember Mo and knows nothing about her mysterious objects) with questions: Who was Mo? How did she die? Did she go insane? Why did she draw such weird pictures?

As Mo's odd possessions nestle their way into Charlotte's everyday existence, she becomes more challenging and rebellious. Forced to embark upon her own research, Charlotte eventually questions whether Mo really was the 'distant relative' her father claims. As John and Charlotte grow apart, both are forced to consider a new reality: that Mo may be more familiar to John than he admits.

== Reception ==
Since its release in February 2017, All the Delicate Duplicates has received generally favorable reviews with the current rating on Steam being 70% positive. Defunct Games gave the game an "A" Rating, saying: "“Few games leave me speechless, but that's exactly what happened when I finished All the Delicate Duplicates…This is incredibly effective storytelling that will stick with you long after the credits roll", that the game is "...better than Zelda" and "It's a standout game. One of the year's best".

Rock, Paper, Shotgun noted that the game contains: "...vibes of Gone Home, Firewatch and the like… there is also a smidgen of Kitty Horrorshow's eerie tales what with all the creepy ambient music, surreal landscapes and handwritten scrawls”. Games journalist Aaron Richardson rated the game 9.3 out of 10 with a breakdown of scores 10 out of 10 for the story, 8 out of 10 for overall gameplay, 9 out of 10 for visuals and 10 out of 10 for replayability.”

When reviewing the game for Digital Fix, Jazz Moore comments on the experimental nature of the game by comparing it to Salvador Dalí's painting ‘The Persistence of Memory’.

In a February 2017 article published by GameNora, Scottish Games Reviewer Lauren Aitken scores All the Delicate Duplicates as 8 out of 10 and favorably compares the game with the television shows Stranger Things and The Twilight Zone, as well.

Mike Marks at Screenjabber takes a more critical approach by questioning whether All the Delicate Duplicates should be considered a game at all, calling it "more of an experience then a game", while finally scoring it 8 out of 10."

Matt Gardner at Fuzzy Pixels writes that he judges the game as "not perfect" while ultimately rating the game 8.2 out of 10, scoring it 10 out of 10 for "Ambitious Storytelling" and comparing it to the game Journey (among others).

== Awards ==
In 2014, All the Delicate Duplicates (then titled Pluto) made the shortlist of the 2014 BBC Writersroom and The Space Prize for Digital Theatre.

In 2015, the project won the Tumblr International Digital Arts and Media Prize, with Danielle Strle, Director of Product for Community and Content at Tumblr stating: "Awarding the Tumblr Prize to Mez and Andy is a total honor and we are excited to be a part of such a thrilling experiment that will foster our continued support of digital art and media."

In October 2016, the game won the Best Overall Game Award at the Game City Open Arcade.

In May 2017, All the Delicate Duplicates was shortlisted for both the Judge's Prize and the People's Choice Award as part of the 2017 Opening Up Digital Fiction Competition: “The first ever UK competition to find the best new examples of popular digital fiction…run by Sheffield Hallam University and Bangor University, and part of the AHRC-funded Reading Digital Fiction project.”
