= Lexia to Perplexia =

Digital poetry by Talan Memmott

- Author: Talan Memmott
- Genre: Electronic literature, Digital poetry
- Publication date: 2000
- Publication place: USA
- Awards: 2000 trAce/Alt-X New Media Writing Award

Lexia to Perplexia is a poetic work of electronic literature published on the web by Talan Memmott in 2000. The work won the trAce/Alt-X New Media Writing Award that year.

== Description of the work ==
The web-based work was a runner-up to the ELO Fiction award in 2001 and was described by judge Larry McCaffery as an "absolutely drop-dead gorgeous, mystifying, cryptifictional hyper-assemblage". Lisa Swanstrom describes it as "a fragmented narrative visually complemented by empty grids, snippets of source code, and cluttered signs of death and mourning."

The work itself consists of four sections: "The Process of Attachment", "Double-Funnels", "Metastrophe" and "Exe.Termination". Aaron Angello explains that each section explores "the complex relationship and illusory borders between subject and machine, between reader and text, between human language and computer code, and between flesh and silicone."

Memmott himself describes Lexia to Perplexia as falling "somewhere between theory and fiction, between the rigorous and the frivolous." It has been described as codework, mixing everyday English with neologisms and computer code.

== Technical obsolescence ==
Lexia to Perplexia was coded in Dynamic HTML and JavaScript, and no longer works in contemporary web browsers. Zach Whalen describes how browser updates in 2012 and 2013 rendered it nonfunctional, and although Whalen altered the code to create a readable version, this did not last. Whalen interprets this as a planned obsolescence on Memmott's part, and concludes that this "gradual obsolescence, prolonged only by backward-compatibility, is just the final part of its fictive performance". According to Aaron Angello, Memmott has "refused to “fix” or “update” the poem, because he contends that that would make it something other than what it was intended to be. Rather, he is choosing to let the poem die because that is what the poem is supposed to do." Angello sees this as a political resistance as it "refuses to play capital's game".

== Reception ==
Lexia to Perplexia was awarded the trAce/Alt-X New Media Writing Award in 2000, and was included in the Electronic Literature Collection Volume One.

It has been on the syllabus at MIT and Yale. As Aaron Angello writes, "If digital literature and poetry can be said to have a canon, Lexia to Perplexia is a central part of it."

Several scholars have published extensive analyses of Lexia to Perplexia, including N. Katherine Hayles's "Metaphoric networks in Lexia to perplexia" in Digital Creativity, which focuses on how the mixture of code and human language situates the computer as a "cognizer" alongside the human reader, and Lisa Swanstrom's ""Terminal Hopscotch": Navigating Networked Space in Talan Memmott's Lexia to Perplexia" in Contemporary Literature.
