= Inanimate Alice =

Digital novel

Inanimate Alice is an ongoing digital novel, an interactive multimodal fiction, relating the experiences of aspiring game designer Alice Field and her imaginary digital friend, Brad, in episodes, journals, social media, and virtual reality. Episodes 1–4 of the series were written by novelist Kate Pullinger and developed by digital artist Chris Joseph as a prequel to an original screenplay by series producer Ian Harper. Episode 1 was released in 2005.

Episode 5, released in 2015, was developed by digital artist Andy Campbell from a script by Kate Pullinger. For episode 6, released in 2016 with funding from Arts Council England, the team expanded to include game and narrative designer Lorri Hopping with contributions from digital artist Mez Breeze. The planned story arc embraces 10 episodes spanning Alice's life from age 8 through to her mid-twenties as she realizes her dream of becoming a game designer. The episodes become increasingly complex as Alice's age and skills improve. The viewer experiences a combination of text, sound and imagery and interacts with the story at key points in mini-games and game-like experiences.

In 2018 an interstitial virtual reality experience, Inanimate Alice: Perpetual Nomads, was released, a coproduction between Australia and Canada. It was developed by Andy Campbell and Mez Breeze.

Inanimate Alice has been used as an example of a digital literacy resource and incorporated into literacy and digital curricula, particularly in the United States and Australia. It has also been widely recognised as an early example of transmedia storytelling.

== Synopsis ==
=== Episode 1 – China ===
Alice is eight years old and living in a base camp in far north China. Her dad, John, scouts for oil. He is two days late in coming home from his latest trip. Alice and her mom, Ming, haven't heard from him. They are worried. While she and her mom go out searching for her dad, Alice turns to her ba-xi player and her virtual friend Brad for comfort. They drive for a long time. Suddenly, Alice hears Brad's voice in her head to 'go that way.' And they find her dad.

=== Alice in Australia ===
After her family moves from China to Melbourne, Australia, Alice's adventures continue in 12 interactive photo stories, written graphic-novel style. She makes friends with twins Carol and Lewis and the neighbors and falls in love with their dog, Tilly. (Alice has always wanted to own a pet but never can because her family moves too much.) While living and being home-schooled in Australia for a year, Alice travels to South Korea and Indonesia with her father John, who is on a business trip, and to Singapore, where she stays with her Aunt Xui Li, her mother Ming's sister. At the end of the year, Alice learns that, once again, the family is on the move, and she has to say good-bye to her new friends.

=== Episode 2 – Italy ===
Alice is 10 years old and on a skiing vacation in the Italian Alps. It is evening, and Alice is alone at the chalet. The ski lifts have shut down for the day and there is heavy snow falling. Her parents haven't arrived back yet. Alice is worried. She turns to her ba-xi player for comfort. First, Alice shows you a puzzle she has created on her player (which you play). Then, Alice makes a call on her player to Ayisha, her tutor in Saudi Arabia. You learn more about Alice's life in Saudi Arabia. During Alice's conversation with Ayisha, she remembers that she was supposed to go the ski school at the end of the day. It's getting late so Alice gets dressed (with your help). Alice heads out in the thick, blinding snow. She has no idea where she is going, and she's scared. Suddenly, she falls. She hears Brad's voice telling her to keep calm. As she gets up, she hears her parents talking. They go back to the chalet and eat pizza and talk. Alice is relieved and happy.

=== Alice in Everloop ===
Between ages 10 and 12, Alice joins Everloop, a real social media site for tweens (now defunct), and sets up a Loop for herself and her virtual friend Brad. Interacting directly with her audience for the first time, the character posts and answers messages, invites her follows to participate in storytelling activities and games, and shares four personal, interactive journals. The journals feature Alice's trademark gadget, interactive content, photo stories from her adventures in Australia, and personal thoughts on school, her friends, her family, her travels, and her adventurous life.

=== Episode 3 – Russia ===
Alice is 13 years old and has been living in an apartment in Moscow, Russia for a couple of years. Her dad is away a lot, working in Siberia. Her mom and dad have begun to argue regularly. Alice was supposed to attend an international school in Russia, but her dad won't allow it because of the risk of kidnapping.

Alice's dad has been dealing with some shady characters in the oil business. The episode begins with Alice hiding out in her bedroom closet. There are men in the apartment arguing loudly with her dad. She hears her mom shouting. Alice's dad is being blamed for a big oil leak, even though it's not his fault.

As Alice hides out in the closet, her virtual friend Brad keeps her company. She plays a game that she created called Matryoshka. With Alice still hiding in her closet, her mom tells her to get her coat because they are leaving. Alice and her parents hurriedly pack and take off into the night to leave Moscow. Alice is scared, but finds reassurance with Brad. As they approach the airfield, they are unexpectedly stopped at a check-point. Alice's dad says that the guard will want a bribe. What the guard wants is Alice's player. Alice refuses to give the player to him. Instead, she shows him the Matryoshka game, and he waves them on.

=== Episode 4 – Hometown ===
Alice is 14 years old and living in a small town in the middle of England. Her friends have dared her to climb to the top of an abandoned building. They claim that the view from the top is the best view in town. Alice accepts the dare. As she climbs to the top, the stairs give way. She narrowly misses falling, but is now stuck at the top of the building, and must find her way out. Alice is frightened.

At this point, Alice begins relating her journey to this new home from Moscow. Her dad is no longer in the oil business. He is teaching, and the family has a lot of debt. Her mum has had to take on a job too. They rent a small narrow house in town. Alice's parents continue to argue regularly. Alice is the only one who likes living here. She is able to attend a regular school for the first time. And she has made friends her own age.

=== Episode 5 – Hometown 2 ===
Alice is 16 years old and has been living in England for almost three years ("a lifetime record"). She spends time hanging out with friends, roaming the city and going to night clubs. Alice's dad is trying to get back in the oil and gas business without luck. (He has outstanding debt with some unsavory types.) Her mum is doing well though. Alice is not doing well in school, except for Art & Tech class.

=== Alice's Gap Year Travels ===
At age 18, a newly independent Alice embarks alone on a year of world travel, sponsored by her aunt in Singapore. She documents her adventures in Indonesia and Japan in five interactive travel journals that include images, video, audio, and a series of language games that she designed to help her make new international friends.

=== Episode 6 – The Last Gas Station ===
Alice is 19 in Episode six. She's at college and working at the gas station on the outskirts of the city, striving to make ends meet. Late in submitting her college work, Alice stumbles from one crisis to another.

=== Alice in Virtual Reality – Perpetual Nomads ===
Alice finds herself stuck on a broken bus in the middle of nowheresville trying and failing to download a new app in this Virtual Reality episode. Each level of the game is represented by a different location (i.e. the autobus, the desert, an empty building). During these levels, Alice encounters obstacles as she tries to charge her phone to get help. Alice must search for an outlet and work with her friends via texting on her phone to fix the autobus and get back on her way. The episode, Alice in Virtual Reality – Perpetual Nomads, had an Early Access Release date on March 14, 2018.

== In the classroom ==
Although Inanimate Alice did not start out as an educational tool, it became one as teachers discovered its intrinsic value as a platform for promoting multiple literacies. Classrooms around the world are now using Inanimate Alice, which offers an across-the-curriculum approach to teaching and learning.

=== Teachers' Edition Suite ===
Released in 2016, the Teachers' Edition Suite offers fast navigation through each of the first 5 episodes of the series. Readers can examine the text in its entirety and investigate Alice's journey much more deeply. Students can focus on the text on their own screens, progressing at their own pace.

=== Multimodal literacy ===
Inanimate Alice reflects the multimodal literacy that children develop naturally during play. In play, children instinctively combine speech, text, sound, games, music, and art. Inanimate Alice does the same by combining text, images, music, movie elements and games.

=== Problem solving literacy ===
Problem solving is also a natural part of child's play. Whether solving a puzzle, building a bridge with blocks, or engaging in pretend play, a child is learning to solve problems through trial and error, feedback and strategy changes. The embedded games that Alice has created, and that later drive the story, provide opportunities for practicing problem solving skills. The increasing complexity of the games helps develop game literacy—literacy of problem solving.

=== Cultural literacy ===
Inanimate Alice can be used as an educational tool for cultural literacy. Each episode takes place in a different country, and reflects a different culture. Teachers can use Inanimate Alice as a springboard to create guided discovery lessons on the cultures and countries represented. The interactive nature of Inanimate Alice as transmedia storytelling facilitates cultural literacy through role play, which enhances students' abilities to understand multiple perspectives.

=== Social-emotional literacy ===
The themes that run throughout Inanimate Alice inspire lessons that enhance social-emotional literacy. Alice is an only child and a lonely child as she travels the world with her parents from episode to episode. She is often frightened as she faces threatening situations, from her father being lost in episode 1, to being left home alone in episode 2, to the dangers in episode 3. In episode 4, Alice must also deal with peer pressure. Alice's fears help students create stronger emotional connections with the character, and open up opportunities for conversations about feelings.

== Awards ==
- 2017 – Inanimate Alice wins Silver in the Digital Content Category of the 2018 Reimagine Education Awards.
- 2017 – The Beta version of Inanimate Alice: Perpetual Nomads received an Honorable Mention in the Turn On Literature Prize, which showcases selected works of electronic literature, which they define as "…works with important literary aspects that take advantage of the capabilities and contexts provided by a stand-alone or networked computer."
- 2017 – The Beta version of Inanimate Alice: Perpetual Nomads was shortlisted in the Opening Up Digital Fiction Writing Competition, an award which is run by Sheffield Hallam University and Bangor University and is the first ever UK competition to find the best new examples of popular Digital Fiction, and part of the AHRC-funded Reading Digital Fiction project.
- 2016 – Inanimate Alice: the Last Gas Station received an Honorable Mention in The Robert Coover Award for a Work of Electronic Literature.
- 2015 – The Inanimate Alice Series was a finalist in the Cool Tool Award – Academic Gaming Solution by EdTech Digest Awards Program 2015.
- 2012 – The Inanimate Alice Series was named a Best Website for Teaching & Learning by the American Association of School Librarians (AASL).
