= Talan Memmott =

- Talan Memmott
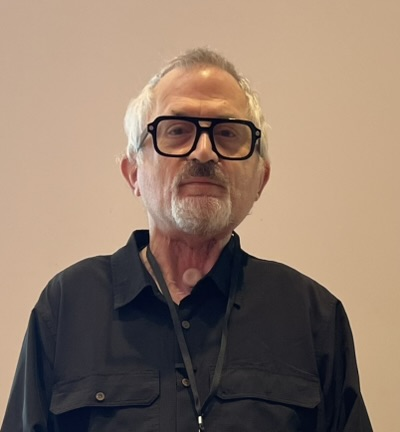
- Talan Memmott at ELO 2025 Love Letters to the Past and Future Toronto Canada 2025-07-12
- Born: 1964 (age 61–62)
- Occupation: Professor
- Writing career
- Language: English
- Website: talanmemmott.info

Talan Memmott (born 1964) is an American digital media artist and researcher known for his contributions to the field of electronic literature. He is the author of over 40 works of electronic literature, including the digital poem Lexia to Perplexia (1999), and his works are collected in The NEXT. Memmott has been the editor of the digital literary journal BeeHive, and has co-edited several anthologies of electronic literature. He is an associate professor at Winona State University.

David Prater, in the Cordite Poetry Review, termed him "an internationally known practitioner of electronic literature and digital art with a practice ranging from experimental video to digital performance applications and literary hypermedia."

== Life, career, and education ==
As a teenager, Memmott played guitar under the name Riff Motor for Short Order Cooks, a Fresno punk band, which toured with the Dead Kennedys.

Memmott received his MFA in Literary Arts/Electronic Writing from Brown University (2004), where he produced a number of notable works, including early writings on codework. Memmott later earned a PhD in Interaction Design from Malmö University (2012). In 2016, Memmott moved to Winona State University where he established the Creative Digital Media program. In 2002, Memmott was awarded the first graduate fellowship in electronic writing at Brown University, home to other notable alumni such as Robert Arellano, Shelley Jackson, Mary Kim Arnold, Mark Amerika, Matt Derby, Judd Morrissey, and Noah Wardrip-Fruin, where he worked with notable faculty including Robert Coover and John Cayley.

In 2020, Memmott was diagnosed with laryngeal cancer and underwent a total laryngectomy. He subsequently returned to teaching at Winona State.

As of 2022, he is a professor of Creative Digital Media in the Mass Communication Department at Winona State University. Memmott was previously a professor in the Digital Culture and Communication Program at the Blekinge Institute of Technology in Karlskrona, Sweden. He also taught in the Teledramatic Arts and Technology Department at California State University Monterey Bay, at the Georgia Institute of Technology, at the University of Colorado Boulder, at the Rhode Island School of Design, and at UC Santa Cruz.

He has served as a vice president of the Electronic Literature Organization.

== Literary works ==
Memmott has written over 40 works of electronic literature as of 2017. His works are collected in the NEXT Museum, Archive, and Preservation Space.

=== Lexia to Perplexia ===
Memmott's work Lexia to Perplexia (1999) is a web-based narrative incorporating images and texts. It is an early example of codework, which is literary writing that incorporates computer code or pseudocode as an aesthetic effect. Lexia to Perplexia was awarded the trAce/Alt-X New Media Writing Prize in 2000, and was included in the Electronic Literature Organization's Collection Volume One. It is frequently taught in university English and digital media classes. Several scholars have published extensive analyses of Lexia to Perplexia, including Lisa Swanstrom's "Terminal Hopscotch”: Navigating Networked Space in Talan Memmott’s Lexia to Perplexia". N. Katherine Hayles focused on Lexia as one of three works analyzed in Writing Machines. Her article "Metaphoric networks in Lexia to Perplexia" in Digital Creativity explains how the mixture of code and human language situates the computer as a "cognizer" alongside the human reader. Barbara Miller explains that "Hayles uses such experimental websites as Talan Memmott's Lexia to Perplexia (2000) to show that inscription technologies, from print to film to video to electronic media, structure the message of the text and alter its interpretation." Angelo Aaron uses Lexia to Perplexia as an example of lost literary works in "To Archive or Not to Archive: The Resistant Potential of Digital Poetry."

=== Self Portrait(s) [as Other(s)] ===
Self Portrait(s) [as Other(s)] (2003), in the Electronic Literature Collection Volume 1 and first published in the Iowa Review Web, is widely taught in university courses on electronic literature and was addressed in Stephanie Strickland and Nick Montfort's article on Collaborations in Elit in the American Book Review and Scott Rettberg's critical work, Electronic Literature.

=== Other works of electronic literature ===
my Molly (departed) (2007) was also featured in Jessica Pressman’s work on Digital Modernism. Toy Garage (2011) is a remix of Nick Montfort's Taroko Gorge generative poem code about Barbies and Raggedy Ann dolls.

Following his surgery for laryngeal cancer in 2020, his works exploring AI and cripistemology, including "Introducing Lary," have appeared in a number of exhibits, including at the University of California at Berkeley and the International Digital Media and Art Association’s (iDMAa) 2022 exhibition.

Memmott has also been active in the netprov community as noted in his 2025 Electronic Book Review interview.

== Scholarship ==
Memmott has written articles about electronic literature, including: "Amorphigrist Illustrations: The Wikipedia Library", and "Codework: Phenomenology of an anti-genre" (2011).

== Editor and publisher ==
In 1998, Memmott started the Electronic Literature journal, BeeHive. He was a co-editor for the Electronic Literature Collection, Volume 2 (ELO), and the ELMCIP Anthology of European Electronic Literature with Laura Borràs Castanyer, Rita Raley, and Brian Kim Stefans. He and Davin Heckman coedited Rhizomes 32: Meme Culture, Alienation Capital, and Gestic Play.

== Awards and keynotes ==
- The 2021 Maverick Award by the Electronic Literature Organization, awarded to Memmott for his “singular contribution to the field of electronic literature.”
- Keynote speaker at the Electronic Literature Organization's annual conference in Toronto, Canada, June 13, 2025, with a talk titled "After Lexia to Perplexia: Digital Hauntologies and Interface Afterlives."
