= Everloop =

Defunct American social media website for children

- Company type: Private
- Founded: February 2011
- Headquarters: San Francisco Bay Area, California, U.S.
- Area served: United States
- Founders: Hilary DeCesare, Kim Bruce, Paige McCullough
- Industry: Social media
- Website: http://www.everloop.com

Everloop was an online social media site specifically made for children ages 8–13.

The site used 'loops' that were similar to Facebook groups that gave teens a place to interact. They were small communities created around interests in categories such as video and photo sharing, writing, video games, etc. Each individual user also had an individual page that they could customize with text or images.

Everloop was made so that preteens had a place to experience social media before moving on to sites like Facebook that were not meant for younger children and could often be dangerous to them.

== History ==
Originally launched for girls under the name "Girl Ambition" in 2010, the site was revamped for a broader audience and relaunched in February 2011 under the name Everloop.com.

In June 2011 Everloop launched EverText, a moderated SMS feature made for safe messaging between kids.

In 2012, Everloop launched Goobit, a mobile app that connected with the main Everloop site.

In 2014, Everloop shut down along with EverText and Goobit.

== Privacy and safety ==
=== COPPA and moderation ===
Everloop was created adhering to the Children's Online Privacy Protection Act (COPPA) standards and uses privacy protection and monitoring technology to guard young users against bullying, bad language and inappropriate sharing of information. Everloop's safety features included parent authentication to join, word and phrase filters, live staff for moderation and customer support and community user reporting for suspicious or inappropriate behavior.

EverText, Everloop's SMS feature, was also made with safety in mind to avoid things such as online grooming using a technology-based filter software that blocked out URLs, addresses, and profanity. EverText's filter could also understand patterns to avoid cyberbullying.

When any inappropriate behaviour was detected, Everloop stopped the user from posting and provided immediate feedback to moderators.

=== Parents ===
The site permitted parents to monitor all friend requests and communication, but did not allow any parental posts to children's profile pages.

== Everloop products and features ==
=== EverText ===
EverText was a SMS integration that was compliant with the Children's Online Privacy Protection Act (COPPA). The service utilized privacy protection technologies, and enables kids to securely use mobile devices to broadcast text updates to friends' profiles or directly to their cell phones.

EverText allowed parents to moderate the number of texts kids can send, ranging from unlimited to 250 texts per month. When a child hit the limit, parents received a note and could add text credit to the account or leave it until the next month.

=== Features ===
- Loops
  - Loops were like Facebook groups, and based around friendships and shared interests such as sports, crafts, music and fan groups. Kids could join existing loops or start loops of their own. Parents used the parent dashboard to approve each loop their child joins.
- Games
  - The Everloop Arcade offered more than 1,500 games for kids and included partnerships with major game platforms such as Miniclip and Mochi Games.
- Evercredits
  - Kids could earn or buy "Evercredits" which allow them to buy items from Everloop's virtual store. Evercredits were earned through participation in the Everloop community or accounts can be funded through secure credit card transactions approved by parents.
- Custom Profiles
  - Kids could create and customize their profiles and loops on Everloop with different backgrounds, colors and stickers.
- Digital Parenting Advice
  - Everloop maintained a parents center that contains information, tips and news for parents on raising responsible digital citizens.

== Affiliations and partners ==
- Inanimate Alice: The character of Alice and her virtual friend Brad shared four custom-made digital journals, activities, stories, games, and more. The presence on Everloop was the first time that the characters interacted directly with their tween audience members.
- Mattel Monster High: Everloop and Monster High started their relationship in September 2011 when they launched an official Monster High Loop on the site that lets users watch episodes of the show, take pools, purchase branded stickets and get exclusive content only available to members of the Everloop community.
- National Geographic Animal Jam: Everloop and National Geographic's Animal Jam partnership began with the official launch of the Animal Jam Loop in September 2011. The online virtual playground that currently has 2 million users now uses Everloop as a complementary platform.
- Simon & Schuster Children's Publishing: Simon & Schuster Children's Publishing and Everloop launched an online interactive book club for this age group in early 2011, giving Everloop users access to children's books and their authors. The site maintains the In the Book Loop where users have access to two free middle-grade level books each month on a web view e-reader and chat sessions with children's authors.
- Mad Science
- Love in the Mirror
- Pencils of Promise
- Greyson Chance
- Mindless Behavior
- HarperCollins

== Funding ==
The company closed a seed round of $3.1 million in 2011 backed by vFormation, Silicon Valley–based Band of Angels, Envoi Ventures, Richard Chino formerly of Overture, Wayne Goodrich formerly of Apple, Deena Burnett-Bailey of Angels of Hope and additional investors.
