= Codework =

Creative writing that includes computer code

Codework is "a type of creative writing which in some way references or incorporates formal computer languages (C++, Perl, etc.) within the text. The text itself is not necessarily code that will compile or run, though some have added that requirement as a form of constraint." The concept of and term 'codework' was originally developed by Alan Sondheim, but is also practiced by and used to refer to the work of other Internet artists such as Mez Breeze, Talan Memmott (especially in the work Lexia to Perplexia), Ted Warnell, Brian Lennon, and John Cayley. Scholar Rita Raley uses the term "[net.writing]," which she defines as "the use of the contemporary idiolect of the computer and computing processes in digital media experimental writing." Raley sees codework as part of a broader practice exploring "the art of code."

Codework has been used for many forms of writing, mostly poetry and fiction. Duc Thuan's Days of JavaMoon is an example of fiction in the codework style (in this case, using JavaScript syntax). For example:

   // Feeling.
   if (ashamed++ == losing self-esteem.S_____ wasn't on diet) [re]solution =
   would stop eating lunch next time;

   // Result.
   after all = S_____ couldn't resist to eat when see[sniff]ing food
   ("ate();", felt defeated & self-disgusted x 1000);
}

A variety of examples of codework can be found in the Electronic Literature Collections published by the Electronic Literature Organization, such as Alan Sondheim's online performance Internet Text (1994-), Giselle Beiguelman's Code Movie 1 (2004), Dan Shiovitz's interactive fiction Bad Machine (1999) (Volume 1), Mez Breeze's "netwurk repository" of "_mezangelles_," _cross.ova.ing ][4rm.blog.2.log][_ (2003-), Bjørn Magnhildøen's live writing performance/text movie, PlainTextPerformance (2010), Ted Warnell's new media network (1994-), and Nick Montfort's Perl poetry generator ppg256-1 (2008) (Volume 2).

== See also ==
- Code poetry
