= SYP (disambiguation) =

SYP is the ISO code for the Syrian Pound.

SYP or Syp may also refer to:

== Organizations ==
- Saskatchewan Youth Parliament
- Scottish Youth Parliament
- Socialist Unity Party (Finland) (1946–1955)
- Society of Young Publishers, in Britain
- South Yorkshire Police
- Suomen Yhdyspankki (abbreviated as SYP), a former Finnish bank

== Places and facilities ==
- Syp, a river in Perm Krai, Russia
- SYP, IATA code for Ruben Cantu Airport in Panama
- Sai Ying Pun station, a railway station in Hong Kong

== Other uses ==
- Southern Yellow pine, several related species of tree found in the southern United States
- SYP, HGNC symbol for Synaptophysin, a human protein
- The "Simple Yet Perfect" teapot, a patented design of teapot
