= Mezangelle =

Artificial language and art project by Mez Breeze

mezangelle is a poetic-artistic language developed in the 1990s by Australian-based Internet artist Mez Breeze (Mary-Anne Breeze). It is recognized as a central contribution to Codework, Electronic literature, Internet Art and digital writing in general.

== Definition and characteristics ==
mezangelle is primarily based on hybrid words. Like the portmanteau words invented by Lewis Carroll or used in James Joyce's novel Finnegans Wake, it dissects and recombines language and stacks multiple layers of meanings into single phrases. It is an Internet-cultural poetic language deriving much of its tension from incorporating formal code and informal speech at once. Its base construction qualifies it as hypertext on a morphological and grammatical level. It is not syntactically fixed and is in continuous artistic development.

mezangelle mixes English, ASCII art, fragments from programming language source code, markup languages, regular expressions and wildcard patterns, protocol code, IRC shorthands, emoticons, phonetic spelling and slang. It is a polysemic multi-layered language that remixes the basic structure of English and computer code through the manipulation of syllables and morphemes. Like the related Codework of Jodi, Netochka Nezvanova, Ted Warnell, Alan Sondheim and lo_y, it bears some resemblance to hacker cultural 1337 / leet speak and Perl poetry.

Through its semantic and syntactical layering, mezangelle achieves an aesthetic effect of altering words and letters from discrete, digital units into fluid, quasi-analog information. This fluidity and flow corresponds to its artistic use in email postings.

== Author ==
Mez works under a multitude of assumed virtual identities or avatars. These avatars are presented throughout the Internet as authors of electronic writing. Examples of these include: mez breeze, netwurker, data.h!.bleeder, ms post modemism, mezflesque.exe, Purrsonal Areah Netwurker and cortical_h[b]acker. mez is best known for her Codework based on her self-invented language mezangelle which she publishes on mailing lists like _arc.hive_, Nettime, and netbehaviour. These work, or "wurks" as she calls them, have language play and identity swapping as a central element. Because of their dense poetical language, they are also acclaimed and influential in Digital Poetry. As of May 2014, Mez is the only Digital Poet who's a non-USA citizen to have her comprehensive career archive (called "The Mez Breeze Papers") housed at Duke University, through their David M. Rubenstein Rare Book & Manuscript Library.

== History ==
=== 1994–1996 ===
mezangelle first appeared in late 1994 - early 1995 on MUDs, the web chat channels Kajplats 305, Cybersite and unix based y-talk. These instances involved re-mixing random chat responses, y-talk and IRC conventions back to the participants. Chat members communicated with each other through text based dialogue using avatars to interact. Notable avatars from this time included Viking, Jester and mez's screen names aeon and ms post modemism.

The Wollongong World Women Online exhibition (1995, University of Wollongong Online Gallery) was the first traditionally presented exhibition to showcase a web-based text version of the mezangelle work _Through Ah Strainer_. Other online exhibitions that included mezangelled works during this period:

- Disgruntled Book of Wizzdumb: a collaborative work between mez and the Brisbane organization digitarts (1996).
- Cutting Spaces: web based mezangelle in the Undercover Girl Project Norway (1996).

=== 1997–2003 ===
During 1997–2003 mezangelle utilized mailing list forums as a distributive medium with an emphasis on peer collaboration. The works evolved into two subgenres: netwurks and codewurks/codeworks. Both forms employed code and chat convention mash-ups, HTML code and scripting languages to manipulate poetic structures. Codeworks included text emulations of broken source code whereas netwurks present in multimedia web interfaces that incorporate several codeworks. An example of a codework is _Viro. Logic Condition][ing][1.1_ and an example of a netwurk is _The data][h!][bleeding tex][e][ts_.

In this period mezangelle shifted from a reliance on script kiddy/hacker influences to a refined interactive practice that explored aspects of fusing biological/physical and online living. Recurring themes from 1996 onward include: gamer dynamics, social engineering, questioning conceptions of print-based and electronic literature, ASCII art, play theory, teledildonics, viral imagery, and examinations of post-modern, feminist, neural net, social change and technofetistic theories.

=== 2003–2007 ===
In this timeframe mezangelle distribution altered from dispersal via mailing lists to social networking formats. The change occurred due to the growing repressive nature of the mailing list forums used, including extensive censorship by list moderators Julianne Pierce from Recode, Ted Byfield/Geert Lovink from Nettime and Chris Chesher from the ::fibreculture:: list.

The livejournal _cross.ova.ing][4rm.blog.2.log][_ created in July 2003 is the first recorded procedural net art blog. There are at least two other known mezangelled blogs currently authored by mez. One is _dis[ap]posable_ which uses reappropriation of the blog format and snapshot software to create clustered poetic meanings. These nodal poems are examples of a type of digital readymade and are to be read via a grid-like text and image composite structure. For example, the tag, title, and link sections are all reworked with poetic loadings and not constructed according to conventional weblog standards.

=== 2007–2014 ===
As well as maintaining mezangelle works via the livejournal blog, this creative period again shifts Mez's artistic emphasis to the use of augmented reality, mixed reality, virtual reality and mobile platforms. In 2008, mezangelle works manifested in mainstream games such as World of Warcraft: "..."Twittermixed Litterature"...involves WoW characters ["toons"] on the Bloodscalp Server standing in Ironforge [an in-game location] + live remixing [in_game] chat that occurs between players and guild/character names that rotate past." . In 2009, mezangelle began appearing in more mainstream projects, including being utilised as a script device in New Media Scotland's alternate reality game "Alt-Winning: A game of Love, War and Telepathy" and as part of the WoW: Emergent Media Phenomenon Exhibition as part of the 3rd Faction's /hug Project at the Laguna Art Museum, California (sponsored by Blizzard Entertainment).

From 2011 to 2014, Mezangelle featured in a set of virtual reality games and mobile apps such as The Dead Tower, #PRISOM, and #Carnivast. #PRISOM premièred at The 2013 International Symposium on Mixed and Augmented Reality on an Augmented Reality Head-up display Unit.
