= Black Perl =

Code poem

"Black Perl" is a code poem written using the Perl programming language. It was posted anonymously to Usenet on April 1, 1990, and is popular among Perl programmers as a piece of Perl poetry. Written in Perl 3, the poem is able to be executed as a program.

"Black Perl" has been discussed in several scholarly works, and is considered an example of generative literature, a genre of electronic literature.

== Attribution ==
When posted to the comp.lang.perl newsgroup the poem was attributed to "a person who wishes to remain anonymous". Sharon Rauenzahn (née Hopkins), another Perl poet, was suspected to be the author but has denied the claim.

== Result of program execution ==
When executed, "Black Perl" exits on line one, upon reaching the function exit. The remaining lines are parsed by the Perl interpreter but never actually executed. The program produces no output.

Though it will not parse under Perl 5, multiple independent updates to "Black Perl" to make it parsable in Perl 5 have been published.

== "Black Perl" ==
BEFOREHAND: close door, each window & exit; wait until time.
    open spellbook, study, read (scan, select, tell us);
write it, print the hex while each watches,
    reverse its length, write again;
    kill spiders, pop them, chop, split, kill them.
        unlink arms, shift, wait & listen (listening, wait),
sort the flock (then, warn the "goats" & kill the "sheep");
    kill them, dump qualms, shift moralities,
    values aside, each one;
        die sheep! die to reverse the system
        you accept (reject, respect);
next step,
    kill the next sacrifice, each sacrifice,
    wait, redo ritual until "all the spirits are pleased";
    do it ("as they say").
do it(*everyone***must***participate***in***forbidden**s*e*x*).
return last victim; package body;
    exit crypt (time, times & "half a time") & close it,
    select (quickly) & warn your next victim;
AFTERWORDS: tell nobody.
    wait, wait until time;
    wait until next year, next decade;
        sleep, sleep, kill yourself,
        die at last

== See also ==
- Digital poetry
