= Code poetry =

Literature that intermixes notions of classical poetry and computer code

Code poetry is literature that intermixes notions of classical poetry and source code. Unlike digital poetry, which prominently uses physical computers, code poems may or may not run through executable binaries. A code poem may be interactive or static, digital or analog. Code poems can be performed by computers or humans through spoken word and written text.

Examples of code poetry include: poems written in a programming language, but human readable as poetry; computer code expressed poetically, that is, playful with sound, terseness, or beauty.

A variety of events and websites allow the general public to present or publish code poetry, including Stanford University's Code Poetry Slam, the PerlMonks Perl Poetry Page, and the International Obfuscated C Code Contest.

== See also ==
- Codework
- Black Perl – a poem in perl
- Recreational obfuscation – writing code in an obfuscated way as a creative brain teaser
- School for Poetic Computation

== Bibliography ==
- Daniel Holden and Chris Kerr, ./code --poetry, Broken Sleep Books (2023). ISBN 978-1-915760-03-6
- Francesco Aprile, Code Poems: 2010–2019, Post-Asemic Press (2020). ISBN 978-1734866216
- Charles Hartman, Virtual Muse: Experiments in Computer Poetry (Wesleyan Poetry), Middletown, Connecticut: Wesleyan University Press (1996).
- Ishac Bertran, code {poems}, Barcelona: Impremta Badia (2012).
