= Taroko Gorge (electronic literature) =

Poetry generator programmed by Nick Montfort

Taroko Gorge is a shared work of electronic literature, first programmed by Nick Montfort. It is a poetry generator that uses random generation.

== Original work and programming ==
Nick Montfort's original version in 2009 was inspired by Taroko Gorge's landscape. The editorial statement from the Electronic Literature Collection explains the inspiration and suggests a reading method: "As the words flow, river-like, on the screen and the poem unfolds, first time readers should read until the ending reveals itself them, after which we suggest looking at the source code." Monfort wrote the original code, and thus David Wright terms him as the "sole creator and authority of this work," which Wright terms as "second-generation electronic literature."

The work, originally in Python, is web-based and relies on JavaScript. N. Katherine Hayles showcases Taroko Gorge as an example of a "slot algorithm" work.

== Publication history and collaboration ==
The work was published in the Electronic Literature Collection #3 9ELC3) from the Electronic Literature Organization. Monfort read the work at the 2009 Digital Arts and Culture conference, and presented the words rather than the code itself, showcasing the program's "built-in grammar and lineation."

Monfort made the program widely available, and new authors can use the code to "remix" that is to replace the original "subject", "verb", "ending" structure with their own vocabularies. This "poetry engine" has been remixed by many writers. Scott Rettberg modified the poem generator, creating a "cacophonous urban poem" rather than a nature poem. Rettberg analyzes the form and the sample code in Electronic Literature. The ELC3 version contains author contributions from multiple authors, including J.R. Carpenter, Talan Memmott, Eric Snodgrass, Mark Sample, and Maria Engberg. Judy Malloy also created a piece with this work. While the code remains intact, other writers have ranged widely in topics For example, Carpenter's remix focuses on food. Mariah Gwin explains that "Each text provides a different meaning based on not only the subject or focus of the version, but also the words that appear as they appear, creating an almost individualized experience that changes each and every time it is read. It is poetry so the meaning is up to individual interpretation." Leonardo Flores, who also used the code to create a poem (TransmoGrify, 2012), notes that "those of us who remixed it after him were not inventing a form, we were adapting, appropriating, even erasing the original works as a 3rd generation move."

Some of the remixes, such as Andrew Plotkin’s “Argot Ogre, OK!" show the code along with the generated poem.

== Education ==
As this code is relatively simple, students have used this piece as a gateway to programming. Students in Kathi Inman Beren's class at the University of Bergen, for example, created original works and "in the process learned some essential lessons about digital writing, computation, web design, and the alternative social network that electronic literature comprises." Anneke Nussbaum reports that the work "invites readers to become digital authors as a kind of gateway poem. " Dani Spinosa explains, "[O]ne of the primary learning objectives of an assignment like the “Taroko Gorge” remix is building the critical digital literacy of recognizing that all digital texts are two texts: a code, and its reconstitution." This work has been taught in the Digital Technology Center, with student analyses.

== External sources ==
- Official website
