= V-R-erses An XR Story Series =

Microstory series using 3D rendered forms

Note that actual title is “V[R]erses”: An XR Story Series.

The V[R]erses is a microstory series using 3D rendered forms that can be used over multiple computers and platforms using a VP App,

== Reading modalities ==
Each 3d rotating form has text nodes to click to open, and a sound loop in the background. The nodes are numbered numerically for a default path order, which appears. Users can select the texts in different orders.

== History ==
This started this series in 2019. Mez Breeze started this series, where each story's text is created by a different digital literature author with Mez Breeze providing the development, design, model, and audio. Many electronic literature writers have contributed to this series, including Mark Marino, Davin Heckman, Scott Rettberg, Annie Abrahams, Jeremy Hight, Andrea Phillips, David Thomas Henry Wright, Michael Maguire, Auriea Harvey, Mez Breeze, Rhea Myers and Chriss Kerr While each work functions in the same manner, each differs widely in aesthetics and content. David Thomas Henry Wright recounts that while he wrote the text, Mez created the images and the work itself, and therefore the text author should not be regarded as the creator of the piece.

== Publications ==
The series is published in The New River Journal of Electronic Literature and Digital Art and featured in Con-ceptuali isms, the anthology of prose, poetry, visual found and hybrid writing as contemporary art, ABC: avantgarde boot camp, and the Electronic Literature Organization's 2021 exhibit.

== Reception ==
Steve Tomusula notes that The V[R]erses are an example of technology uses that are revolutionizing literature. Marc Garrett recommends The V[R]erses as an example of literature "straddling the fields of art, technology, and social change."
