= Futureculture =

Future Culture, also known as FUTUREC or "FC", is a mailing list founded in 1992, that is concerned with online and internet culture. It currently resides on listserv.uark.edu.

== History ==
The mailing list was created in 1992 on a public Unix system by Andy Hawks, then in high school. After a fallout with the rest of the group, Andy destroyed the list of members early 1993 and took the list offline. Various subscribers have since continued the Future Culture list at a different address and the list moved from nyx.cs.du.edu, ending up on the UAFSYSB mainframe (fondly remembered as "list dad") at the University of Arkansas under the care of Clark Wilson Moore (June 27, 1953 - November 3, 2018) who sent and signed his emails "Alias Datura" ("list mom"). See here for a brief overview of the early days of Future Culture.

Andy Hawk's original Future Culture Manifesto, also known as the Bubble Manifesto, can be considered to be an historical document reflecting the state of mind at the dawn of the Internet, specifically the aspect of "virtual culture". This document refers to key movements in the early 1990s that have led to – and have strongly influenced – how society thinks about and uses technology and specifically the internet.

The pre-corporate Internet was envisioned as a place of massive movement of thought; the manifesto documents this and approaches the ideas of transformation: from an economic-based world to an ideas-based world. As it turned out, this did not happen, but the idea was documented here and referred to repeatedly in a variety of different media, especially by academics working in Internet-related fields of study. (cf MIT Media Lab (mediaMOO), as well as a variety of people working under the general rubric of PostModernism.)

Although many of the Future Culture list were vehemently opposed to making the archives of their postings publicly available, a selection of the emails that were exchanged during the initial period found their way to the web. These archived messages give a good impression of the topics that were typically discussed.

An indication for the popularity of Future Culture during its hey-days, is that the group was mentioned on Billy Idol's album Cyberpunk.

A document listing a variety of influences this mailing list has had on other groups or that carry on in the same memespace is found on Marius Watz' FutureCulture page. This page also serves as a link to a memorial for Michael Current, who was among the most active members. His death was a huge shock for the Future Culture community. An in-depth coverage of the events leading up his death, a hoax suicide threat, and the painful aftermath has been written by a Future Culture's member. This sad event was also an inspiration for Mia Lipner's sound art piece Requiem Digitatem.

FutureCulture had part in 'liberating' the William Gibson work Agrippa: A Book of the Dead.

The list has been mentioned in at least two books introducing the reader to the world of cyber cultures, Victor J. Vitanza's CyberReader 2/e, "an anthology of readings on the new technologies and their impact on social and individual identities" and in Jonathan Marshall's ethnography of the mailing list Cybermind, Living on Cybermind

It is mentioned as "landmark event" by Andrew Edmond in his article "Pioneers of the Virtual Underground: A History of our Culture" in issue 1, 1997 of The Resonance Project.

== Purpose ==
Future Culture was originally created as a forum for the discussion of the integration of fringe technology and fringe culture; a mix of the digital underground and the new countercultures such as modern primitives, rave culture and post punk technologists. The William Gibson quote "The street finds its own uses for things" was an appropriate guideline for the topics on the list.

The topic of the mailing list, as stated in the accompanying, but rarely updated, Future Culture FAQ is to be a forum for "real-time discussion of cyberculture/new-edge/technoculture" which is a deliberately vague description of its contents.

However, as time passed, the topics on the list drifted and the people on the list have, instead, formed a rather tight community discussing everything, including the stated topics, but more often personal and everyday things.

== Community ==
The FC mailing list has an overlapping memespace and membership with a few other online communities, in particular the Leri mailing list, the NEXUS-GAIA crowd, the Collective and the Cybermind mailing list.

Members of FC were also involved in the production of the first Internet opera, Honoria in Ciberspazio. The libretto was an example of collaborative writing initiated by a student at the Computer Writing and Research Lab at The University of Texas at Austin. Several of the notable members of the FC list are cast as characters in the libretto.

FC members were also active in the MIT Media Lab MediaMOO, were there were notably building bearing the FC mark.

During 1996 and 1997 some 10 members of Future Culture participated in a Web based game called Nomic.

FC'ers are continuing to be active in many other forms of cultural and technological expressions.

== See also ==
- Virtual community
- Cyberpunk
- MOO
- Cybermind
