= A Million Penguins =

2007 collaborative novel by Penguin Books

- Logo of the "wiki-novel" from the original site used for the collaborative creation of the e-book
- Author: 662 unique contributors
- Genre: Collaborative fiction, Hypertext fiction, Electronic literature
- Publisher: Penguin Books and De Montfort University
- Publication date: 2007
- Publication place: United Kingdom
- Media type: Wiki
- Website: amillionpenguins.com (archived on 3 February 2007)

A Million Penguins was an experimental collaborative fiction framed as a "wiki-novel". It was launched in 2007 by Penguin Books in collaboration with Kate Pullinger on behalf of the Institute of Creative Technologies at De Montfort University, inspired by the success of Wikipedia.

== About the project ==
As the first collaborative web fiction to be sponsored by a large mainstream publisher, the project received a lot of attention. The site quickly became a target for vandalism, and no cohesive plot or narrative developed.

The story ran on an installation of MediaWiki and could be contributed to by any site visitor, although a team of students at the university moderated contributions, in an attempt to keep the project on-track. Despite having 1,476 registered users, only a small portion contributed to editing the site, and of that small portion just two users contributed to over 25% of the edits. Due to the site receiving more than 100 edits every hour, Penguin imposed "reading windows" that froze the novel so that editors could read over what had been changed to get their bearings on where the story was going.

On March 7, 2007, the Penguin Books UK blog announced that the project had come to an end.

== Reception ==
Although some commentators expressing interest in seeing how the project took shape, including the potential educational benefits others described its progress as "predictably horrible". The final report on the project notes that the project neither produced a cohesive narrative or a community: "The contributors did not form a community, rather they spontaneously organised themselves into a diverse, riotous assembly."

Subsequent scholarship on collaborative fiction frequently references the project, though often as a warning. Paul Rower writes that the "result was deemed a failure because of the many un-integrated elements", while Anne Cong-Huyen calls it "ambitious but incomprehensible". Writing for the Institute for the Future of the Book, Ben Vershbow questioned why Penguin would choose the wiki as a form: "they chose the form that is probably most resistant to these new social forms of creativity". Those who reference the project positively note that the project turned into something that was more of a social experiment, rather than one of literature, since the contributions were from a diverse mix of people.

In April 2008, the Institute of Creative Technologies of De Montfort University published A Million Penguins Research Report, which concluded: "We have demonstrated that the wiki novel experiment was the wrong way to try to answer the question of whether a community could write a novel, but as an adventure in exploring new forms of publishing, authoring and collaboration it was, ground-breaking and exciting."
