= Cybermind =

Cybermind is an Internet mailing list devoted to "the philosophy and psychology of cyberspace".

== History ==
It was co-founded by Alan Sondheim and Michael Current in mid-1994 to explore, exemplify and discuss multiple aspects of cyberspace, both from theoretical and experiential perspectives. The list was born in the split of the spoon collective lists from the Thinknet group, over issues of free speech and appropriate philosophical expression. Early membership involved much overlap with the Futureculture List. In more recent years discussions have become more general, but the list still has members from its founding period. Michael Current died shortly after the founding of the group.

List discussion has resulted in books, articles, conferences, more than one academic thesis, a group novel (now available through Lulu.com), and a strong ongoing community. Cybermind itself has been the subject of academic research, including an anthropological doctoral dissertation by Jonathan Marshall at the University of Sydney, which has now been published as the book Living on Cybermind. The book details the life of people on Cybermind over the period from 1994 to 2006 and uses many quotations from list members to analyse the ambiguities of net presence and absence (which is called asence), the paradoxes of the public/private divide, difficulties arising around authenticity and aggression, netsex, net-politics, and the construction of 'community'.

== Publications ==
=== Refereed ===
- Argyle, Katie. "Life After Death", in Rob Shields ed. Cultures of Internet: Virtual Spaces, Real Histories, Living Bodies. Sage, London 1996.
- Cubbison, Laurie. "What does it Mean to Write from the Body", Women and Language vol. 20, no. 1, 1997, pp. 31–35.
- Don, Alexanne. "The dynamics of gender perception and status in email-mediated group interaction", Transforming Cultures eJournal, vol. 2, no. 2 (2007).
- Kiley, Dean. "John John and Di Die Live on the Internet: Cyberbullying on Academic Mailing Lists", Mesh: a Journal of Experimental Media Arts, 13, 1999/2000.
- Marshall, Jonathan. (2001) "Cyberspace or Cybertopos: The creation of online space", Social Analysis 45(1) 2001: 81–102.
- Marshall, Jonathan. "The Sexual Life of Cyber-Savants", The Australian Journal of Anthropology 14(2), 2003: 229–248.
- Marshall, Jonathan. "Governance, Structure and Existence: Authenticity, Rhetoric, Race and Gender on an Internet Mailing List", Proceedings of the Australian Electronic Governance Conference 14 and 15 April 2004, Centre for Public Policy, University of Melbourne.
- Marshall, Jonathan. "The Online Body Breaks Out? Asence, Ghosts, Cyborgs, Gender, Polarity and Politics", Fibreculture, issue 3, 2005.
- Marshall, Jonathan. "Categories, Gender and Online Community", E-Learning, 3(2), 2006.
- Marshall, Jonathan Paul. "Gender in Online Worlds: An Introduction to, and Summary of, Cybermind Research", Transforming Cultures eJournal, vol. 2, no. 2 (2007)
- Marshall, Jonathan. "The Mobilisation of Race and Gender on an Internet Mailing List", Transforming Cultures eJournal, vol. 2, no. 2 (2007)
- Marshall, Jonathan Paul Living on Cybermind: Categories, Communication and Control, Peter Lang, New York, 2007
- Marshall, Jonathan Paul "Cybermind: Paradoxes of Relationship in an Online Group", in Samantha Holland (ed). Remote Relationships in a Small World, Peter Lang 2008.
- Marshall, Jonathan Paul. "Ambiguity, Oscillation and Disorder: Online Ethnography and the Making of Culture", Cosmopolitan Civil Societies Journal 2(3), 2010: 1–22.
- Marshall, Jonathan Paul. "Culture, Disorder, and Death in an Online World", in Honglei Li (ed) Virtual Community Participation and Motivation: Cross-Disciplinary Theories. IGI Global, 2012: pp. 330–346.
- Maus, Fred Everett. "We Were Online", Perspectives of New Music, vol. 43/44; (2/1), 2005, pp. 314–337. doi:10.1353/pnm.2006.0023
- Milne, Esther. "The Epistolary Body of Email: Presence, Disembodiment and the Sublime" The Southern Review 35.3 (2002) pp. 80–93 [mention only]
- Milne, Esther. "Email and Epistolary technologies: Presence, Intimacy, Disembodiment", Fibreculture, issue 2, 2003
- Milne, Esther. "'Dragging her dirt all over the net': Presence, Intimacy, Materiality", Transforming Cultures eJournal, vol. 2, no. 2 (2007)
- Milne, Esther Letters, Postcards, Email: Technologies of Presence, Routledge, London, 2010.
- Ruane, Dierdre. "Weavers & Warriors? Gender and Online Identity in 1997 and 2007", Transforming Cultures eJournal, vol. 2, no. 2 (2007).
- Sondheim, Alan, ed. "Being Online: Net Subjectivity", Lusitania, vol. 8, New York 1996.
- Sondheim, Alan, ed. New Observations: Cultures of Cyberspace, vol. 120, 1999.
- Spooner, Michael & Yancey, Kathleen. "Postings on a Genre of Email", College Composition and Communication, vol. 47, no. 2 (May 1996), pp. 252–278 [mention only]

=== Unrefereed ===
- Crawford, Karen. "Letters from", Transforming Cultures eJournal, 2(2) December 2007: 128–139.
- Ghaly, Salwa. "Reflections on Cybermind", Transforming Cultures eJournal, 2(2) 2007: 158–172.
- lynne. "Cybermind: A Case Study", April 17, 2005
- Marshall, Jonathan Paul. "Cybermind discusses gender", Transforming Cultures E-Journal 2(2) 2007: 226–266.
- Sondheim, Alan. "Gender and You", Transforming Cultures E-Journal 2(2) 2007: 194–200.

=== Unpublished theses ===
- Hoberman, David. Body, Text and Presence on the Internet, honours thesis, Department of Anthropology, Tufts University, 1996.
- Ruane, Deirdre. Citizens of Cyberia: Explorations of Self and Society on the Internet, study submitted in part fulfilment of the requirement for the award of Bachelor of Arts degree in Communication Studies at Dublin City University, August 1997

=== Fiction ===
- Blaze Rosewood. Cybermind Novel (2008), Alchemical Elephant, Sydney ASIN B009AI8DKC
