= Alan Sondheim =

American poet

Alan Sondheim is a poet, critic, musician, artist, and theorist of cyberspace from the United States.

== Biography ==
Alan Sondheim was born in Wilkes-Barre, Pennsylvania. He holds a B.A. and M.A. in English from Brown University. He lives with his partner, Azure Carter, in Providence, Rhode Island.

== Works ==
Sondheim's books include the anthology Being on Line: Net Subjectivity (1997), Disorders of the Real (1988), .echo (2001), Vel (Blazevox, 2004-5), Sophia (Writers Forum, 2004), The Wayward (2004), and "Writing Under" (2012), as well as other chapbooks, ebooks, and articles. Sondheim has long been associated with the trAce online writing community, and was their second virtual-writer-in-residence. His video and filmwork have been widely shown. Sondheim was an Eyebeam resident.

Sondheim co-moderates several email lists, including Cybermind, Cyberculture and Wryting. Since 1994, he has been working on the "Internet Text," a continuous meditation on philosophy, psychology, language, body, and virtuality. His artwork can also be found within Second Life. In 1996 he was keynote speaker for the Cybermind96 Conference in Perth Western Australia - one of the world's first conferences specifically organised around an email discussion list. In 2012 he was a presenter and active participant at the CyPosium, a one-day online symposium on cyberformance.

Sondheim is the developer of the concept of codework, wherein computer code itself becomes a medium for artistic expression.

His poetico-philosophical writings deal with the notion of embodiment and presence in cyberspace, loosely based on the work of postmodern philosophers Jacques Lacan and Jacques Derrida. He explores notions of the 'abject' in the masculine and feminine online, and more recently has dealt with the machinic using the language of computer code to articulate novel forms of identity in cyberspace. His work crosses over between philosophical explorations and sound poetry and more recently he has returned to the language of music using the tonalities of a wide range of ethnic instruments. His poetry has spanned several decades ranging from avant-garde beat poetry and stream-of-consciousness of the late 60's and 70's and soundscape poetry, maturing into a complex melding of multiple representational forms. In the late 1960s Sondheim's work was published in 0 to 9 magazine, an avant-garde journal which experimented with language and meaning-making.

In 2009, Sondheim was working on a book examining the phenomenology and foundations of the analog and digital, and another on developing an aesthetics of virtual realities and avatars. Sondheim's explorations included: the aesthetics of virtual environments and installations; mapping techniques using motion capture and 3D laser scanners; Buddhist philosophy and its relation to avatars and online environments; and experimental choreography.

In 2013, Alan spoke at the South By Southwest (SXSW) Interactive festival on Glitch aesthetics and techniques.

In April 2022, his book, Broken Theory was published on the Punctum Books imprint. A collection of writing fragments and ideas, the book is a complex flow of ideas, experiments, and personal reflections that reflect his interests in the somatics of theory, philosophy, and art - how the body is necessary for such cultural production. Broken Theory's preface is written by Maria Damon, and the volume contains a lengthy interview with Sondheim conducted by the art historian Ryan Whyte.

Alan has released six music albums on the ESP Record label, most recently ’’Galut:Ballads of Wadi-Sabi’’ with Azure Carter

=== Exhibits ===
International Digital Media and Art Association’s 2022 Weird Media Exhibition, 2022 (Specters/Ghost Files)

== The Internet Text ==
The Internet Text can be seen as Sondheim's major work, and was included in the first Electronic Literature Collection. Posted online since 1994, it is both an aggregate of Sondheim's writings and a "continuous meditation on cyberspace." The works are distributed on several email lists and gathered on Sondheim's website. The significance of The Internet Text is as a document or residue of Sondheim's diverse writings and performances, and also as a philosophical reflection on computer mediated communication and online culture.
