= Mad Science =

Children's education company

- Company type: Children's education & entertainment Activities
- Industry: Education & Enrichment Services
- Founded: 1985
- Founder: Ariel & Ron Shlien
- Headquarters: Montreal, Quebec, Canada
- Area served: Worldwide
- Website: madscience.org

The Mad Science Group is an enrichment services company that specializes in delivering educational and entertaining science experiences for children by presenting concepts in a visual and interactive manner. Mad Science franchisees offer after-school programs, workshops, birthday parties, special events, and camps. Programs are designed for children from pre-school to middle school and feature topics such as light, sound, electricity, magnetism, anatomy, optics, chemistry, space technology and robotics. Children are given hands-on activities combined with discussion and demonstrations to meet specific learning objectives through a fun and challenging environment.

== History ==
Two brothers, Ariel and Ron Shlien, created Mad Science in 1985. The brothers grew up performing science experiments. As adults, they developed activities which they performed at their local YMCA. The success of these interactive science presentations led to the development of after school programs and workshops at local school and community centers. The company continued to grow, and in 1990 the brothers registered the name "The Mad Science Group".

In 1994 Mad Science partnered with Royal Caribbean International to offer science shows to the children on board. In the mid-1990s Mad Science began franchising its concept, opening 28 franchises across North America by the end of 1996.

In 1999, Ariel and Ron received The Young Entrepreneur Award from the Business Development Bank of Canada. "Winners are chosen according to selection criteria based on company growth, involvement in the new economy, innovation, community work, and export performance".

Over the next decade, Mad Science continued its growth and to date has over 150 franchises in 23 countries.

== Mad Science Productions ==
Mad Science Productions, incorporated in 1997, was a division of the Mad Science Group that specialized in the development, production, and operation of interactive science-based stage shows for theme and amusement parks, performing arts centers and fairs.

Mad Science Productions had four shows available for touring: "Star Trek Live" ^{[11]}, based on the Star Trek movie, "CSI: LIVE!" ^{[13]}, based on the television series CSI, "Lights, Camera, Action & You!: The Science Behind the Movies", which demonstrated the science behind movie making, and "Newton's Revenge 2", which demonstrated the role of physics in everyday life.

Produced in collaboration with the Kennedy Space Center Visitor Complex and NASA, "Mad Mission to Mars" was staged at the Kennedy Space Center in Cape Canaveral, Florida, United States, where it premiered in 2001 through to 2009 as the feature family-audience show offering.

== NASA partnership ==
Since 2007, NASA and The Mad Science Group have partnered to develop and deliver the Academy of Future Space Explorers, created by the "Space Act Agreement," with a mission to encourage children to pursue careers in STEM. This agreement has been in-force for more than twenty years. Mad Science is the only Canadian educational organization with a signed United States Congregational agreement. In 2018, NASA partnered with Mad Science Group to introduce NASA OPSPARC, a challenge consisting of various missions designed to teach kids about spin-off technology.
