= Redistributors =

- Directed by: Adrian Tanner
- Written by: Adrian Tanner
- Produced by: Louise Clover
- Starring: Alexandra Evans; Alastair Mackenzie; Jeff Rawle
- Edited by: Jon Dean
- Music by: James William Blades
- Release date: 2015
- Running time: 82 minutes
- Country: United Kingdom
- Language: English

Redistributors is a 2015 film directed by Adrian Tanner, starring Alexandra Evans and Robert Boulton, with supporting performances from Alastair McKenzie, Jeff Rawle, Tim Bentinck, and James Allen.

The film was nominated for Best Thriller at the 2016 UK National Film Awards, while Alexandra Evans was the winner of the Best Supporting Actress category.
