= Adrian Tanner =

English director and writer

Adrian Tanner is a writer and director based in London whose work includes the feature film Redistributors that was nominated for Best Thriller at the 2016 UK National Film Awards.

His short film Trading Licks was completed in 2013 and stars Roger Allam and Justin Edwards. It was selected for The Bahamas, Newport Beach and London Short film festivals and broadcast internationally.

Tanner has directed many hours of on-line content for brands such as M&S and Barclays and began his career as a television editor on prime time shows such as Watchdog and Home Front and drama documentaries.
