= Transliteracy =

Ability to use diverse techniques to collaborate across different social groups

Transliteracy is "a fluidity of movement across a range of technologies, media and contexts". It is an ability to use diverse techniques to collaborate across different social groups.

Transliteracy combines a range of capabilities required to move across a range of contexts, media, technologies and genres. Conceptually, transliteracy is situated across five capabilities: information capabilities (see information literacy), ICT (information and communication technologies), communication and collaboration, creativity and critical thinking. It is underpinned by literacy and numeracy. (See figure below) The concept of transliteracy is impacting the system of education and libraries.

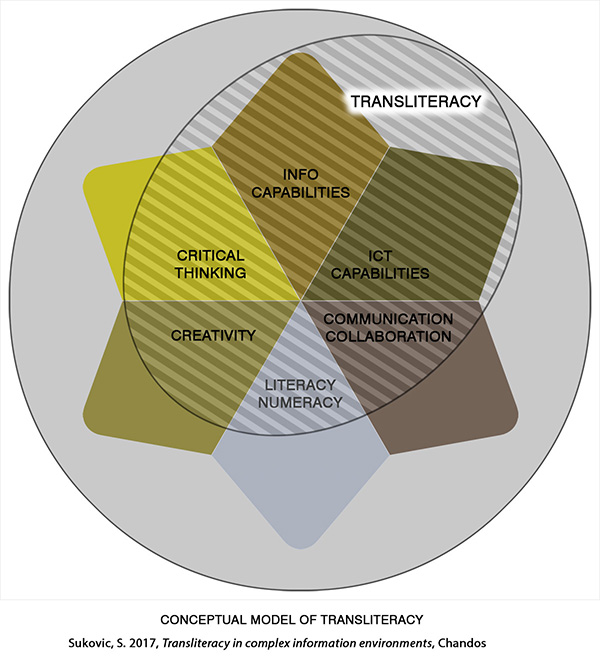
Transliteracy: conceptual model (Suzana Sukovic,"Transliteracy in complex information environments", Chandos, 2017)

== History ==
While the term appears to come from the prefix trans- ('across') and the word literacy, the scholars who coined it say they developed it from the practice of transliteration, which means to use the letters of one language to write down a different language.

The study of transliteracy was first developed in 2005 by the Transliteracies Research Project, directed by University of California at Santa Barbara Professor Alan Liu. The concept of 'transliteracies' was developed as part of research into online reading. It was shared and refined at the Transliteracies conference, held at UC Santa Barbara in 2005. The conference inspired the at the time De Montfort University Professor, Sue Thomas, to create the Production in Research and Transliteracy (PART) group, which evolved into the Transliteracy Research Group. The current meaning of transliteracy was defined in the group's seminal paper Transliteracy: crossing divides as "the ability to read, write, and interact across a range of platforms, tools, and media from signing and orality through handwriting, print, TV, radio, and film, to digital social networks." The concept was enthusiastically adopted by a number of professional groups, notably in the library and information field. Transliteracy Research Group Archive 2006–2013 curates numerous resources from this period.

For a number of years, there was a gap between significant interest in transliteracy among professional groups and the scarcity of research. A group of academics from the University of Bordeaux considered transliteracy mainly in the school context. Freelance writer and consultant, Sue Thomas, studied transliteracy and creativity, while Suzana Sukovic, executive director of educational research and evidence-based practice at HETI, researched transliteracy in relation to digital storytelling. The first book on the topic, Transliteracy in complex information environment by Sukovic, is based on research and experience with practice-based projects.

== Transliteracy in education ==
Transliteracy is making an impact on the classroom setting because of how technologically advanced younger generations are today. In 2012, Adam Marcus, a teacher and librarian at the New York City Department of Education (NYCDOE), decided to incorporate transliteracy into his school's public library summer reading program. He had a desire to enhance the experience of reading for his students by allowing them to connect to the text differently by using social media. He used a tool called VoiceThread in order to have his students "take part in conversations, formulate ideas, and share higher-order thinking through a variety of media channels: video, audio, text, images, and music". Students were also enabled to communicate with the book's author through blogs and websites, and were given multiple modes of media to comprehend and engage with the text on a deeper level. Some of these examples include an audio-video glossary and web links that aimed to bring the details of the text to life. The results of his experiment were deemed to have a positive effect on the program as students responded well to this interactive experience they were given. Marcus believes that it is important for educators and librarians to enhance storytelling for children by providing them with a modern and transliterate experience that one could not receive back then.

The Agence nationale de la recherche funded a program at a French high school from 2013 to 2015, where the transliteracy skills of students were tested and observed. Students were placed in groups of three or four members and were required to use all sorts of media and tools in order to collect data for their projects. They were not allowed to only use digital sources, and were advised to use a diversity of sources. The focus of this experiment was to observe "the possible diversity of media and tools employed, on the ways of and reasons for switching from one to another, on how these different media and tools are distributed within contexts, according to the academic requirements and tasks individually and collectively performed by the students." The conclusions of the experiment dealt with physical space and organization being an issue for students and teachers to deal with. Spatially, it was challenging for students to navigate through different mediums when their space inside the classroom was limited. It was noticed that students were prone to use something that took up less space, rather than focusing on expanding their diversity of sources. Organizationally, it was challenging for students to organize all of the information they collected since everything was not being search and collected for digitally. In addition, students were not allotted a lot of time to complete their projects which also impacted their final product.

== Transliteracy in libraries ==
In 2009, Dr. Susie Andretta, senior lecturer in Information Management at London Metropolitan University, conducted interviews with four different information professionals including an academic librarian, an outreach librarian, a content manager, and a scholar within the library science and information discipline. She was aiming to explore how transliteracy was colliding and combining with the print-world of libraries. Dr. Andretta defines transliteracy as "an umbrella term encompassing different literacies and multiple communication channels that require active participation with and across a range of platforms, and embracing both linear and non-linear messages (3)." The goals of these interviews ranged from the following: to test the information professional's awareness of transliteracy, to have them identify transliteracy and how it is integrated into their work, and to explain the impact transliteracy has had on they library they work at. Andretta found that out of all the information professionals interviewed, it was only the academic librarian who was vaguely familiar with the concept of transliteracy. Bernadette Daly Swanson, an Academic Librarian at UC Davis, expresses in her interview with Dr. Andretta how she would "like to think that the transliterate library is more of an environment where we do different things [...] I would take maybe about a third of the first floor of our library and transform it into a lab [...] where we can start to evolve [..] explore, and experiment in media development, content development, and do it not just with librarians; so open up the space for other people [...] so you don't get people working in isolation." Although the other three candidates that Dr. Andretta interviewed had not heard of the term transliteracy, they responded well to the concept once it was explained to them and agreed with its impact on the workplace. Dr. Michael Stephens, an assistant professor in the Graduate School of Library and Information Science at Dominican University, explains in his interview how the term transliteracy describes the courses he teaches on libraries and Web 2.0 technologies. Dr. Stephens states that students being educated in Web 2.0 technologies gives them "the opportunity to experience what the channel can be and the potential for that sharing learning, for asking questions, just for out loud thinking – I think it's incredibly valuable. [..] this is where this wonderful concept comes in, it was teaching them transliteracy and the fact that they can move across channels without getting worried about it."

Dr. Andretta concluded from her interviews how although transliteracy may not be a very well-known term yet, it has nonetheless established itself into the intuition of libraries while also transforming the traditional library to a world of enhanced and expanded services. "Inherent in this transition are the challenges of having to adapt to a constantly changing technological landscape, the multiple literacies that this generates, and the need to establish a multifaceted library profession that can speak the multiple-media languages of its diverse users."

Thomas Ipri, a librarian at the University of Nevada, advocates for libraries needing to make a change in their literary functions. He argues that the divide between digital and print makes it harder for libraries to accommodate their patrons and to share information. He focuses on how libraries need to establish their relationship with transliteracy because transliteracy "explores the participatory nature of new means of communicating, which breaks down barrier between academia and the wider community and calls into question standard notions of what constitutes authority by emphasizing the benefits of knowledge sharing via social networks." Ipri argues how established experts are no longer the only ones in charge of producing and spreading information, but it is also the personal experiences and knowledge of people that are valuable in expanding and evolving bases. In what he describes, "the heart of librarianship," it is the duty of librarians to undergo this development by modernizing their movements of communication and information.

== Relationship to other terms ==
Related terms are media and information literacy, information literacy, digital literacy, multiliteracies and metaliteracy. Transliteracy is a unifying framework rather than a replacement of existing literacies. It considers "movement across" which requires a range of capabilities.

== See also ==
- Digital humanities
- Digital media
- Digital scholarship
