= Society of Young Publishers =

The Society of Young Publishers (SYP) was founded in 1949. Its main aim is to enable publishers in the first ten years of their career to network, exchange ideas and learn more about the industry. Previously restricted to people under 36, the constitution was amended in 2007 to allow anybody "young to publishing" or an allied industry to join. The Society of Young Publishers is a volunteer-run organisation supporting those looking to get into or develop within publishing across the UK and Ireland. The Society of Young Publishers are open to anyone, of any age, interested in publishing or a related trade – or who is hoping to be soon.

Headed up by an independent UK committee in charge of administration, the SYP is also composed of seven regional committees that run events in London, Oxford, Scotland, Ireland, Northern England, South West England and Wales. The current UK chairs are Michaela O'Callaghan (Trade Marketing Executive at Bounce Sales and Marketing) and Eleanor Gaffney (Project Editor at Dialogue).

The SYP has been running a number of digital events since March 2020 and it is looking to open up further branches in the UK. The SYP publishes the magazine InPrint four times a year, in addition to holding a range of speaker and networking events. The SYP also hosts a biannual conference, which takes place in Scotland in the spring and alternates between London and Oxford in the autumn.

The Society of Young Publishers offers a range of digital content to support those looking to get into and ahead in publishing. This includes a podcast, a blog, email newsletters, and a resource centre. They also run a yearly mentorship scheme and, in 2023, relaunched the Spare Room Project and Spare Zoom Project.
