= Lisa Swanstrom =

American researcher

Elizabeth Swanstrom is an American researcher in literature, media theory and the digital humanities. She is associate professor of English at the University of Utah and co-editor of the journal Science Fiction Studies. She is the author of Animal, Vegetable, Digital, a Co-Editor of Science Fiction studies, and a Co-Editor of the Electronic Book Review. She holds a Ph.D. in Comparative Literature from the University of California, Santa Barbara in June 2008, an M.P.W. in Professional Writing from the University of Southern California, and a B.A. in Classics from New College of Florida. Her areas of study include science fiction, fantasy, the history of science and technology, and the digital humanities. She was a postdoctoral research fellow at Umeå University's HUMlab in northern Sweden, and the Florence Levy Kay Fellow in the Digital Humanities in the English Department at Brandeis University in Massachusetts.

== Career ==
Her research includes science fiction, natural history, media theory, and the digital humanities. She examines texts, art installations, and cultural artifacts, including video games "born digital".

She is an associate professor at the University of Utah. Before joining the faculty at the University of Utah, she was an assistant professor of English at Florida Atlantic University. Here she received a National Endowment for the Humanities grant to create CELL: a search engine for electronic literature.

Swanstrom is a member of the developmental and editorial team of The Agrippa Files: An Online Archive of Agrippa. She writes short fiction and serves as co-editor for the online literary journal Sunspinner.

== Honors and awards ==
- Elizabeth Agee Manuscript Prize for Animal, Vegetable, Digital. (2014)
- Shortlist, Science Fiction Research Association Pioneer Award (2010)
- AWP Intro Journals Award in Creative Nonfiction for The Divers.

== Works ==
- Swanstrom, Elizabeth. Animal, Vegetable, Digital: Experiments in New Media Aesthetics and Environmental Poetics. Tuscaloosa, AL: University of Alabama Press, March 2016
- Small Screen Fictions with Astrid Ensslin and Pawel Frelik, published by Paradoxa

Swanstrom experiments with adding layers of information and interpretation to text files. She collaborated on Inventory of Affect which "reads any .txt file for its emotional content." A Field Guide to Artificial Nature(s) (2018) uses a web framework to create a visualization of the texts weather, climate, geography, animals, and plants to show relationships between texts and environment.

She has edited journals, including a 2013 stint as a guest editor for the Digital Humanities Quarterly as well as currently editing the Electronic Book Review and Science Fiction Studies.

Swanstrom provided a keynote, "Forecasting Sustainability" for the Digital Humanities in the Nordic and Baltic Countries conference in 2023.
