= Rita Raley =

American digital literature researcher

- Occupations: Associate professor, University of California, Santa Barbara
- Awards: Career Development Awards - FCDA/Regents (2012-2013)

Academic work
- Notable works: Tactical Media

Rita Raley is an American researcher who focuses on digital literature. Her research interests include new media, electronic literature, digital humanities, contemporary arts (literature, media), activism and social practices, tactical media, global English, discourse on globalization, and language and information politics.

== Education and experience ==
As part of the Mellon-funded project on Digital Humanities, Raley had fellowship appointments at UCLA and the National Humanities Center. She has taught at the University of California, Santa Barbara, Rice University, and the University of Minnesota. She was also an adjunct Associate Professor in the English department at New York University (NYU), from 2012 to 2013. Raley was awarded a Fulbright Fellowship which included a 2011 appointment at the University of Bergen, Norway, with a research project titled "ELMCIP: Electronic Literature as a Model of Creativity and Innovation in Practice." In December 2011, she attended a writing residency in Amsterdam, which was hosted by the Dutch Foundation for Literature.

Raley won the UCLA's 2012-2013 Career Development Awards- FCDA/Regents, which is a program that provides funding for junior faculty to pursue their research.

== Career ==
Raley is an associate professor of English, whose main focuses are in film and Media Studies, Comparative Literature, and Global Studies at the University of California, Santa Barbara (UCSB). She has served in a number of administrative positions including: Vice-chair, Academic Senate (2020–2021); UC Humanities Research Institute Advisory Committee (2015–2018); chair, UCSB Program Review Panel (2015-2017 [member and vice-chair, 2013-2015]) Chair, UCSB Graduate Council (2011–2012); UC Coordinating Committee on Graduate Affairs (2011–2012); IHC Advisory Board (2005–2008). Raley directs the Transcriptions Center, and as well as co-directs the Literature and Culture of Information specialization at UCSB.

In 2023, Raley started work on a Critical Machine Learning Studies Faculty group funded by the University of California Humanities Research Institute.

== Critical writing ==
Raley co-edits the Electronic Mediations book series for the University of Minnesota Press and is an associate editor for ASAP/Journal. Raley has published a number of scholarly articles and book chapters.

Critical writing
Title	Type of Publication	Publisher	Year
"Playing with Unicorns: AI Dungeon and Citizen NLP"	article in an online journal	Digital Humanities Quarterly	2020
"Machine Writing: Translation, Generation, Automation"	article in an online journal	MATLIT: Materiallities of Literature	2018
"Algorithmic Translations"	article in a print journal	CR: The New Centennial Review	2016
"TXTual Practice"	article	University of Minnesota Press	2013
"Another Kind of Global English"	article in a print journal	the Minnesota review	2012
"'Living Letterforms': The Ecological Turn in Contemporary Digital Poetics"	article in a print and online journal; conference paper/presentation	Contemporary Literature	2011
"On Locative Narrative"	article in ta print journal	Genre: Forms of Discourse and Culture	2008
"Editor's Introduction: Writing.3D"	article in an online journal	The Iowa review	2006
"'Of Dolls and Monsters': An INterview with Shelley Jackson"	article in an online journal	The Iowa Review	2002
"Interferences: [Net.Writing] and the Practice of Codework"	article in an online journal	Electronic Book Review (ebr)	2002
"The Digital Loop: Feedback and Recurrence"	article in an online journal	Leonardo Electronic Almanac	2002
"Reveal Codes: Hypertext and Performance"	article in an online journal	Postmodern Culture	2001

=== Works ===
Rita Raley published Tactical Media with the University of Minnesota Press in 2009, which was published as part of the Electronic Mediations series. "In Tactical Media, Raley provides a critical exploration of the new media art activism that has emerged out of, and in direct response to, postindustrialism and neoliberal globalization." She has published excerpts of this work in The Yale Journal of Criticism and Diaspora.

She is the co-editor of the Electronic Literature Collection, Volume 2 (2011) as well as a special issue from American Literature at Duke University Press (2023) on Critical AI.

Raley has given many talks on electronic literature, such as the 2013 talk at the University of Texas at Austin as the featured presenter of the Digital Writing and Research Lab's annual Speaker Series.
