= Mez Breeze =

Australian artist

- Occupations: Artist and practitioner of net.art

Mez Breeze is an Australian-based artist and practitioner of net.art, working primarily with code poetry, electronic literature, mezangelle, and digital games. Born Mary-Anne Breeze, she uses a number of avatar nicknames, including Mez and Netwurker. She received degrees in both Applied Social Science [Psychology] at Charles Sturt University in Bathurst, Australia in 1991 and Creative Arts at the University of Wollongong in Australia in 2001. In 1994, Breeze received a diploma in Fine Arts at the Illawarra Institute of Technology, Arts and Media Campus in Australia. As of May 2014, Mez is the only Interactive Writer and Artist who is a non-USA citizen to have her comprehensive career archive (called "The Mez Breeze Papers") housed at Duke University, through their David M. Rubenstein Rare Book & Manuscript Library.

== Work ==
"Mez does for code poetry as jodi and Vuk Ćosić have done for ASCII Art: Turning a great, but naively executed concept into something brilliant, paving the ground for a whole generation of digital artists."

— Florian Cramer

Breeze developed, and continues to write in, the hybrid language mezangelle. Her unorthodox use of language demonstrates the ubiquity of digitisation and the intersections of the digital and the real that are increasingly common in 21st century life. As well as creating static literary texts using mezangelle, Breeze also creates multi-disciplinary multimedia works online, and participates in online happenings that blur the lines between on- and off-line behaviour.

=== Code poetry ===
"These works are not content to let code remain below the surface but rather show it erupting through the surface of the screen to challenge the hegemony of alphabetic language."

— N. Katherine Hayles

Mezangelle is a type of poetry Breeze developed in the 1990s using Internet text language found in ASCII codes, online games, and other forms of Internet communication. For example, Breeze titled her 2022 work "[Por]TrAIts" where the capitalization of AI represents the subject of the book (a collaboration between a human and an AI writer). "Mezangelle" refers both to the works themselves and the hybrid language in which they are composed—codeworks of this sort "playfully utilize programming terminology and syntax" alongside "human-only" or so-called natural language, creating a creolised language that combines human language and code. In these works, the primary message is semantically overcoded in such a way that multiple different readings are made possible. For example, the word 'mezangelle' itself is sometimes written as 'm[ez]ang.elle', which itself demonstrates the ways in which punctuation and non-alphabetical symbols (in this case the period and square brackets) disrupt and erupt through the human readable language. The word "mezangelle", itself a neologism, is fractured into multiple fragments that may allude to the words '"Mez", "ez" (easy), "mangle", "angle", "angel", and "elle", along with many possible others. This hybridisation of human-only and digital languages demonstrates both the reliance of human language upon connotation and context, and the inclusion of code in everyday digital communications. Breeze also creates games in which texts in mezangelle are combined with images and sound. These works are often fragmentary or chaotic, as they rely both upon the polysemic nature of mezangelle and the inherent possibilities of computer programming for the display of dynamic audiovisual elements.

=== Online interventions ===
Breeze also explores and exploits environments that involve online socialisations or encounters. Such encounters involve the modification of online gaming environments, such as World of Warcraft, EVE Online, and social networking and alternate gaming software. As a member of the online group Third Faction, Breeze has been involved in a number of in-game projects within World of Warcraft, with the aim of disrupting and challenging the combative structure of the game. In this way, Breeze challenges the assumed binary division between the online environment and the real world, and acts to subvert the factionalised “confrontational player-vs-player interaction” that the game world tries to enforce. Breeze's use of multiple avatars for her digital works further emphasises the breakdown of the division between digital and real selves.

=== List of works ===
- V[R]erses in the New River (Fall 2020). Work is described as a microstory in virtual reality where text nodes are embedded in a three-dimensional form, with a sound loop in the background. Users can control the sequence or leave in an autopilot mode.
- All the Delicate Duplicates (2017) is described as a literary walking simulator game where the reader interacts with objects that have narrative cues.
  1. PRISOM (2013) uses Unity to reflect on social surveillance
- The Dead Tower (212) was a Flash work that used Mezangelle
- <? echo [THE_SIGNIFIER] ?> (2002) Reviewed in I love E-Poetry April 10, 2012
- _the data][h!][bleeding texts_ (2001)
- internal damage report and Fleshis.tics in Cauldron & Net, Volume 2 (1999) Reviewed in I love E-Poetry October 14, 2012
- datahbabee Vs Narrow][B][randing first appeared in frAme 5 from trAce. This work has been preserved in the Next

== Exhibitions ==
- Wollongong World Women Online, 1995
- ISEA, 1997 Chicago USA
- ARS Electronica, 1997
- The Metropolitan Museum, Tokyo Japan 1999
- SIGGRAPH, 1999 & 2000
- _Under_Score_, The Brooklyn Academy of Music, USA 2001
- +playengines+, Melbourne Australia 2003
- p0es1s, Berlin Germany 2004
- Arte Nuevo InteractivA, Yucatán Mexico 2005
- Radical Software, Turin Italy, 2006
- DIWO, the HTTP Gallery London, 2007
- Y O U . O W N . M E. N O W . U N T I L . Y O U . F O R G E T . A B O U T . M E. Museum of Modern Art Ljubljana 2008
- New Media Scotland, 2008
- The Laguna Art Museum California and Alternator Gallery Canada, 2009
- Federation Square Melbourne, 2010
- Transmediale Berlin, 2011
- [Por]TrAIts: #AI Characters + Their Microstories [Book 1]’ (2022). Featured in the Future of Text Symposium, London, September 28, 2022.
- International Digital Media and Art Association’s 2022 Weird Media Exhibition, 2022 (Dayforth)

== Awards ==
- Marjorie Luesebrink Career Achievement Award (2018)
- VIF Prize, Germany (2001)
- Electronic Literature Organisation Fiction Award Finalist for "the data][h!][bleeding texts" (2001)
- JavaArtist of the Year, Austria (2001)
- Newcastle Digital Poetry Prize, Australia (2002)
- Site Specific Index Page Competition, Italy (2006)
- Burton Wonderland Gallery Winner - judged by Tim Burton, Australia (2010)
- Transmediale Vilèm Flusser Award Nominee, Germany (2011)
- Western Australian Premier's Book Awards Finalist: “Digital Narrative” Category for “#PRISOM” (2014)
- BBC Writersroom/The Space Digital Theatre Competition Finalist (2014)
- Thiel Grant Award for Online Writing Finalist (2015)
- Shortlisted in the “Games Development” Category of the MCV Pacific Women In Games List, which profiles the: “…most influential women across all facets of the Australian and New Zealand Games Industries.” (2015)
- Tumblr International Prize (2015)
- The Space's “Open Call” Commission for “Pluto” (2015)
- Queensland Literary Awards: QUT Digital Literature Award for "V[R]ignettes" (2019)
- Woollahra Digital Literary Awards Readers’ Choice Award: Mez Breeze, Perpetual Nomads (2020)
- Woollahra Digital Literary Awards Digital Innovation Development Prize Winner: Mez Breeze, 1080 (2026)

== Publications ==
- Human Readable Messages_[Mezangelle 2003–2011] (2012).

== See also ==
- List of electronic literature authors, critics, and works
- Digital poetry
- E-book#History
- Electronic literature
- Hypertext fiction
- Interactive fiction
- Literatronica
- Virtual reality
- Digital art
- Artificial intelligence art
