= Collaborative working environment =

Organizational unit

A collaborative working environment (CWE) supports people, such as e-professionals, in their individual and cooperative work. Research in CWE involves focusing on organizational, technical, and social issues.

== Background ==
Working practices in a collaborative working environment evolved from the traditional or geographical co-location paradigm. In a CWE, professionals work together regardless of their geographical location. In this context, e-professionals use a collaborative working environment to provide and share information and exchange views in order to reach a common understanding. Such practices enable an effective and efficient collaboration among different proficiencies.

== Description ==
The following applications or services are considered elements of a CWE:

- E-mail
- Instant messaging
- Application sharing
- Video conferencing, Web conferencing
- Virtual workplace, document management and version control system
- Task and workflow management (Task management and Workflow management)
- Wiki group or community effort to edit wiki pages. (e.g. wiki pages describing concepts to enable a common understanding within a group or community)
- Blogging where entries are categorized by groups or communities or other concepts supporting collaboration

== Overview ==
The concept of CWE is derived from the idea of virtual work-spaces, and is related to the concept of remote work. It extends the traditional concept of the professional to include any type of knowledge worker who intensively uses information and communications technology (ICT) environments and tools in their working practices. Typically, a group of e-professionals conduct their collaborative work through the use of collaborative working environments (CWE).

CWE includes online collaboration (such as virtual teams, mass collaboration, and massively distributed collaboration), online communities of practice (such as the open source community), and open innovation principles.

== Collaborative work systems ==
A collaborative working system (CWS) is an organizational unit that emerges any time when collaboration takes place, whether it is formal or informal, intentional or unintentional. Collaborative work systems are those in which conscious efforts have been made to create strategies, policies, and structures in order to institutionalize values, behaviors, and practices that promote cooperation among different parties in an organization so as to achieve organizational goals. A high level of collaborative capacity will enable more effective work both at the local and daily levels, and at the global and long-term levels.

Collaboration is the collective work of two or more individuals where the work is undertaken with a sense of shared purpose and direction, and is attentive and responsive to the environment. In most organizations collaboration occurs naturally, but ill-defined work practices may create barriers to natural collaboration. The result is a loss of both decision-making quality and valuable time. Well-designed collaborative working systems not only overcome these natural barriers to communication, they also establish a cooperative work culture that becomes an integral part of the organization's structure.

== Differences from CWS ==
A collaborative work system is related to the collaborative working environment. The latter notion is more focused on technology and was issued from the concept of collaborative workspaces, driven from research within the MOSAIC Project.

The concept of 'system' in 'collaborative work system' has a self-explanatory power that is different from 'environment'. The former pertains to an integrated whole, including collaborative work conceived as a purposeful activity, whilst the later stresses the surroundings of an object – the collaborative working practices.

A collaborative work system generally includes a collaborative working environment, but it should be conceived primarily as a set of human activities, intentional or not, that emerge every time a collaboration occurs. This enables focus on the work practices that are necessary for human collaboration and draws attention to important behavioral variables such as leadership and motivation outside the CWE.

=== CWS and collaborative software (or groupware) ===
Besides participatory leadership, another key element of a successful collaborative work system is the availability of group collaboration technology or groupware – hardware and software tools that help groups to access and share the information the professionals need to meet, train or teach.

However, a collaborative work system (CWS) does not necessarily require groupware support. A simple way to conceptualize the relation between the two concepts is to consider computer supported cooperative work (CSCW) as a whole consisting of a collaborative work system (CWS) supported by collaborative software or groupware.

On the other hand, a collaborative working environment which supports people in both their individual and cooperative work, whatever their geographical location, transcends the notion of CSCW which deals specifically with cooperative work.

== See also ==
- Integrated collaboration environment
- Collaborative information seeking
- Collaborative workflow
- Organizational culture
