= Distributed collaboration =

Distributed collaboration is a way of collaboration wherein participants, regardless of their location, work together to reach a certain goal. This usually entails use of increasingly popular cyberinfrastructure, such as emails, instant messaging and document sharing platforms to reduce the limitations of the users trying to work together from remote locations by overcoming physical barriers of geolocation (using cyberinfrastructure) and also to some extent, depending on the application used, the effects of working together in person. For example, a caller software that can be used to bring all collaborators into a single call-in for easier dissemination of ideas.

== Goals ==
One of the major goals for distributed collaboration is to facilitate use of shared resources and communication. There is a need to enable some sort of interaction which may involve exchange of gestures and body language information at an informal level which is usually unavailable to participants at remote locations. The essence is to allow for groups to collaborate over distances in a manner that emulates, as nearly as possible, the effectiveness of collaboration when the participants meet in person.

== Measure of effectiveness ==
The measure of effectiveness of a distributed collaboration often bases itself on the concept of collocation. The idea is to bring the team performance as nearly as possible to a scenario wherein the users are actually collocated. This further brings in the concept of Proximity. Studies have revealed that working on a familiar, previously worked upon topics, with people around you could increase the attentiveness and work output whereas, the same scenario, when applicable to an unfamiliar topic of work, could oftentimes prove to be distracting and unproductive.

== Meaning of collocation ==
Decreasing proximity leads to asymptotic behavior in communication. This means that after a certain finite distance between participants, usually until the participants are actually out of sight of each other, the proximity can be treated the same as if participants were across continents.

The usual type of collocation is the "Project Room" type of collocation wherein the resources for work are stored in a place (e.g. a cloud storage platform) and the participants come in and go out depending upon their availability to work. Another common collocation type is “Radical Collocation” which means all participants and resources are present in the place of work for the duration of the project.

== Advantages of collocation on distributed collaboration ==
Higher proximity (i.e. lesser distance between participants) usually increases the chances of collaboration. This means that people on the same work floor are more likely to collaborate on a project than people in the same building but different work floors. The realization of collocation in a distributed collaborative environment can thus lead to higher productivity.

Moreover, use of cyberinfrastructure, such as emails, instant messaging and document sharing help remove the requirement of synchronicity which would, erstwhile, have been imposed if the participants were to meet physically.

== Infrastructures ==
Following (technical) infrastructures enables distributed collaboration over traditional collaboration:

=== Internet ===
The low cost and nearly instantaneous sharing of ideas, knowledge, and skills through the internet has made collaborative work dramatically easier. It allow files to be exchanged, drawings and images to be shared, or voice and video contact between team members. Not only can a group cheaply communicate and test, but the wide reach of the Internet allows such groups to easily form in the first place, even among niche interests. An example of this is the free software movement, which produced GNU and Linux from scratch.

=== Collaborative software ===
Computer-supported collaboration focuses on technologies that affect groups, organizations, communities, and societies. Collaborative software designed to help people involved in a common task to achieve their goals by creating a computer supported cooperative work, which includes all contexts in which technology is used to mediate human activities such as communication, coordination, cooperation, competition, entertainment, games, art, and music. It addresses "how collaborative activities and their coordination can be supported by means of computer systems."

Base technologies and software such as netnews, email, chat and wikis could be described as social, collaborative, both or neither. Those who say "social" seem to focus on so-called virtual community, while those who say "collaborative" seem to be more concerned with content management and the actual output. While software may be designed to achieve closer social ties or specific deliverables, it is hard to support collaboration without also enabling relationships to form, and hard to support a social interaction without some kind of shared co-authored works.

=== Cloud and document collaboration ===
Document collaboration is a system allowing people to collaborate across different locations using Internet, and cloud collaboration enabled approach. In recent years, the market has seen a rapid development in document collaboration tools. Primitive document collaboration used email, whereby comments would be written in the email with the document attached. However, if the email is then forwarded or replied to, the comments can be easily lost, also it is hard to keep track of the most recent version of a document. Document-centric collaboration is the next step in the evolution of document collaboration. These systems put the document and its contents at the center of the process and allow users to tag the document and add content specific comments, maintaining a complete version control and records and storing all comments and activities associated around a document.

These innovations are possible because of the development of cloud computing, whereby software and applications are provisioned on the Internet. Cloud collaboration is promoted as a tool for collaboration internally between different departments within a firm, but also externally as a means for sharing documents with end-clients and receiving feedback. This makes cloud computing a versatile tool for firms with many different applications in a business environment.

=== Crowdsourcing ===
Crowdsourcing is to divide work between participants to achieve a cumulative result. In modern crowdsourcing, individuals or organizations use contributions from Internet users, which provides a particularly good venue for distributed collaboration since individuals tend to be more open in web-based projects where they are not being physically judged or scrutinized, thus can feel more comfortable sharing. In an online atmosphere, more attention can be given to the specific needs of a project, rather than spending as much time in communication with other individuals.

Crowdsourcing can either take an explicit or an implicit route. Explicit crowdsourcing lets users work together to evaluate, share, and build different specific tasks, while implicit crowdsourcing means that users solve a problem as a side effect of something else they are doing. Advantages of using crowdsourcing may include improved costs, speed, quality, flexibility, scalability, or diversity. Advantages of using crowdsourcing may include improved costs, speed, quality, flexibility, scalability, or diversity. Crowdsourcing in the form of idea competitions or innovation contests provides a way for organizations to learn beyond what their base of minds of employees provides.

== Examples of distributed collaboration ==
=== Peer production ===
Peer production (also may refer to as mass or social collaboration) is a way of producing goods and services that relies on self-organizing communities of individuals. In such communities, the labor of a large number of people is coordinated towards a shared outcome. Peer production is a process taking advantage of new collaborative possibilities afforded by the internet and has become a widespread mode of labor. One of the earliest instances of networked peer production is Project Gutenberg, a project in which volunteers make out-of-copyright works available online. Free and open source software, such as Linux and Wikipedia, an online encyclopedia, are another examples of peer production. Commons-based peer production is a subset of peer production, in which the creative energy of large numbers of people is coordinated into large, meaningful projects, mostly without traditional hierarchical organization or financial compensation.

=== Collaborative writing ===
Collaborative writing refers to projects where written works are collaboratively created by multiple people together rather than individually. These projects might also collaboratively edited. Using collaborative writing tools can provide substantial advantages to projects ranging from increased user commitment to easier, more effective and efficient work processes. Since this software makes it easy for users to contribute from anywhere in the world, projects can benefit from distributed collaboration.

Examples of these collaborative writing tools includes:

- Collaborative programming including Web IDEs such as Cloud9 IDE, PythonAnywhere, and Eclipse Che for collaborative code-writing, and Mercurial and Git (used in GitHub, Bitbucket, GitLab and CodePlex) for collaborative revision control
- Collaborative real-time editors such as ShareLaTeX, Etherpad, Hackpad, Google Docs, Microsoft Office, and Authorea
- Online platforms mainly focused on collaborative fiction that allow other users to continue a story's narrative such as Protagonize and Ficly
- Wikis like Wikipedia, Wikia, and Baidu Baike.

=== Mobile collaboration ===
Mobile collaboration is a technology-based process of communicating using electronic assets and accompanying software designed for use in remote locations. Mobile collaboration utilizes wireless, cellular and broadband technologies enabling effective distributed collaboration independent of location, Where traditional video conferencing has been limited to boardrooms, offices, and lecture theaters, recent technological advancements have extended the capabilities of video conferencing for use with discreet, hand-held mobile devices, permitting true mobile collaborative possibilities.

=== Distributed collaborative learning ===
Collaborative learning is based on the model that knowledge can be created within a population where members actively interact by sharing experiences and take on asymmetry roles. Put differently, collaborative learning refers to methodologies and environments in which learners engage in a common task where each individual depends on and is accountable to each other.

Technology is an important factor in distributed collaborative learning. The Internet has allowed for a shared space for groups to communicate. Virtual environments have been critical to allowing people to communicate long-distances but still feel like they are part of the group. Computer-supported collaborative learning is a relatively new educational paradigm within collaborative learning which uses technology in a learning environment to control and monitor interactions, to regulate tasks, rules, and roles, and to mediate the acquisition of new knowledge. An example of Computer-supported collaborative learning is MOOC, that support collaborative allow for a strong and engaging learning environment.

=== Collaborative translation ===
Collaborative translation is a translation technique that has been enabled by cloud collaboration technology where multiple translation participants with varying tasks participate simultaneously in a collaborative workspace with shared resources. They generally sharing a computer-assisted translation interface that includes tools for collaboration. The purpose of collaborative translation is to reduce the total time of the translation lifecycle, improve communications, particularly between translator and non-translator participants, and eliminate many management tasks.

An example of collaborative translation is Duolingo, where members of the public were invited to translate content and vote on translations. The content came from organizations that pay Duolingo to translate it. Documents could be added to Duolingo for translation with an upload account which had to be applied for.

=== Crowdfunding ===
Crowdfunding is a form of crowdsourcing and the practice of funding a project or venture by raising monetary contributions from a large number of people. Croudfunding is now often performed via Internet-mediated registries. Crowdfunding has been used to fund a wide range for-profit entrepreneurial ventures such as artistic and creative projects, medical expenses, travel, or community-oriented social entrepreneurship projects.

Arguably the best-known example of crowdfunding, and also crowdsourcing, is Kickstarter which missioned to help bring creative projects to life. In Kickstarter, project creators choose a deadline and a minimum funding goal. As an assurance contract, if the goal is not met by the deadline, no funds are collected. The platform is open to backers from anywhere in the world and to creators from some certain countries.

== See also ==
- Collaboration
- Mass collaboration
- Collaborative information seeking
- Collaboration tool
- Collaborative software
