= Electronic meeting system =

An electronic meeting system (EMS) is a type of computer software that facilitates creative problem solving and decision-making of groups within or across organizations. The term was coined by Alan R. Dennis et al. in 1988. The term is synonymous with group support systems (GSS) and essentially synonymous with group decision support systems (GDSS). Electronic meeting systems form a class of applications for computer supported cooperative work.

Mainly through (optional) anonymization and parallelization of input, electronic meeting systems overcome many deleterious and inhibitive features of group work.

Similar to a web conference, a host invites the participants to an electronic meeting via email. After logging into the session, meeting attendees participate primarily through their keyboards, typing responses to questions and prompts from the meeting host.

== Delineation ==
Electronic meeting systems need to be distinguished on the one hand from classic groupware, on the other from web conferencing systems. In reality, there is some overlap between minor features of products of the named categories.

The main difference from groupware is the intensity of collaboration. According to Lubich's classification, groupware supports collaboration within groups where the individual contributions remain identifiable. In contrast, EMS enable the group to cooperatively produce a result for which the group is responsible as a whole. In a business process, groupware and electronic meeting systems complement each other: Groupware supports teams when researching and creating documents in the run up to an EMS session or when implementing the results of such a session.

Web conferencing systems and electronic meeting systems complement each other in the online meeting or workshop: EMS extends the web conferencing system by providing interactive tools for producing and documenting group results. On the other hand, web conferencing systems complement EMS with the screensharing and voice conferencing functionality required in synchronous online meetings and not present in EMS.

== History ==
=== Beginnings ===
Nunamaker et al. cite the CASE project PSL/PSA of the mid sixties as the beginnings of EMS technology. The first systems recognizable as EMS from today's perspective developed in the early 1980s as university and research projects. (1) At the University of Arizona, a prototype called Plexsys was developed building on the PSL/PSA project. (2) At the University of Minnesota a system called SAMM (Software Aided Meeting Management) was created. (3) At Xerox PARC, Colab was developed. (4) Researchers at the University of Michigan developed MAC-based EMS-tools.

The efforts differed in their goals: While work at Xerox PARC focused on small cooperating groups of 2 – 6 individuals, work at the University of Arizona focused on groups of 16 – 24.

The late 1980s saw the beginnings of a commercial market for EMS. In 1989, the University of Arizona founded Ventana Corporation to transfer the Plexsys technology from the laboratory to the workplace. In 1992 Xerox PARC spun off Live Works Inc which developed the product LiveBoard based on the project Colab.

=== 1990s: Early LAN-based systems ===
Group Systems, which was developed by the Ventana Corporation, is generally acknowledged to be the ancestor of modern EMS. Group Systems provided the standard functionality of modern EMS such as brainstorming and categorization, votes and discussions in the context of a chronological agenda. Contributions could be entered in parallel and anonymously. The results of one step of the meeting process e.g., a brainstorming, could be copied to a follow-up tool e.g., a vote.

The product was based on Clients running on Microsoft Windows machines which accessed a server running a Paradox database via a mapped drive on the local network (LAN). The limitation to local ("same place") meetings, the substantial infrastructure requirements and the complexities of controlling the software prevented widespread adoption. Consequently, Group Systems was developed as a tool for the expert facilitator of computer-aided meetings. These meetings were often conducted in custom computer-equipped conference rooms or by specialised consultancies with dedicated kit.

In the late 1990s and early 2000s further EMS such as the Dutch Inteam or the American Meetingworks sprang up. As LAN-based client-server systems they shared the limitations of such systems. In contrast, facilitate.com adopted HTML suffering the (then) severe functional limitations of that technology for the advantage of working over the Internet.

=== Web applications ===
Since 2005 EMS development has focused on browser-based systems and easy to use GUIs. Prototypical for this generation of EMS are the product Thinktank which is based on Group Systems, the later MeetingSphere the anonymous electronic brainstorming focused Monsoon and the pure HTML yet another Meeting All of these products deliver the functionality of an EMS over the Internet, however, they differ as to their focus and functional depth: MeetingSphere and Spilter are very complete, functional, user-friendly and professional. ThinkTank provides and extends rich functionality with an eye to professionally facilitated workshops. yaM, and other pure HTML options position their products as integrated tool kits for everyday online meetings and workshops as well as the asynchronous work of virtual teams.

A special role is played amongst EMS by the product nextModerator which provides interactive tools to very large groups assembled in one location for a special event.

On the territory of post Soviet countries and Western Europe an important part in popularization and development of EMSs in recent years played locally-developed systems like SW 6000, PATENTEM, GlavCom etc.

== Standard functionality ==
An electronic meeting system is a suite of configurable collaborative software tools that can be used to create predictable, repeatable patterns of collaboration among people working toward a goal. With an electronic meeting system, each user typically has his or her own computer, and each user can contribute to the same shared object (session) at the same time. Thus, nobody needs to wait for a turn to speak and people don't forget what they want to say while they are waiting for the floor. When a group or a group's host deem it appropriate, people can contribute anonymously to most electronic meeting systems tools: this allows the group to focus on the content of ideas, rather than their sources.

Most EMS provide the standard functionalities described below but differ markedly in the handling and functional depth of these tools. Further, they differ by the set of additional tools they provide and by the way they are administered or integrated into a corporate IT environment. They also differ in the degree of interoperability with web conferencing systems for screen sharing and voice conferencing.

=== Brainstorming and categorization ===
In an electronic brainstorming, the group creates a shared list of ideas. In contrast to paper-based brainstorming or brain-writing methods, contributions are directly entered by the participants and immediately visible to all, typically in anonymous format. By overcoming social barriers with anonymity and process limitations with parallelized input, more ideas are generated and shared with less conformity than in a traditional brainstorming or brain-writing session. The benefits of electronic brainstorming increase with group size.

In many cases, subsequent to a brainstorming session or the collection of contributions, ideas require categorization. For this, in modern EMS, participants drag contributions from the shared list to category folders or buckets.

=== Discussion ===
Discussion tools in EMS resemble a structured chat which may be conducted on separate topics in parallel, often based on a superordinate task or question. Parallelization occurs at multiple levels: (1) At the level of multiple topics which are presented for discussion at the same time. Participants are free to contribute to some topics while merely scanning others. (2) Further, parallelization occurs at the level of contributions which the participants can enter independently of each other. Discussions are conducted anonymously or named. In most EMS group identity is also available (e.g., "marketing department").

Compared to an oral discussion, an electronic discussion enables a much more intensive exchange of arguments in shorter time. With anonymity, interpersonal conflict is minimized, peer pressure reduced. In many cases, a parallel electronic discussion enables the exploration of topics which would have been bypassed in traditional settings for lack of time.

=== Vote ===
Sophisticated EMS provide a range of vote methods such as numeric scale, rank order, budget or multiple selection. In more advanced systems, a ballot list can be subjected to multiple votes on multiple criteria with different vote methods for utility or impact analysis. Results are available in real time, typically both as tables and charts.

Further features include integration with social media as well as a Q&A system.

In contrast to voting methods available in traditional workshops such as raising hands or the placing of sticky notes on a white board, electronic votes are anonymous and provide for a more differentiated assessment of ideas, opinions or facts. Some EMS provide for voting with group identity for extra insight into the structure of consensus or dissent.

=== Agenda ===
Modern EMS organize the process of a meeting into an agenda which structures the activities of a meeting or workshop by topic, chronology and the use of a supporting tool. From the agenda, the host (facilitator) of the meeting invites ("starts") the participants to contribute to the various activities. In some EMS, agendas can be copied from an existing meeting or from meeting templates.

=== Automatic minutes ===
The results of an EMS-based meeting exist as content in a database. The content can be exported to a file, delivered to an externally integrated system of record, or simply printed. Formatting and available file formats differ substantially between EMS, with commonly available options including HTML, Markdown, and office document formats.

== Synchronous and asynchronous meetings ==
Modern EMS support both synchronous (participants meet at the same time) and asynchronous (participants contribute at different times) meetings.

Synchronous meetings provide for immediate, spontaneous interaction between participants. Asynchronous meetings increase participant availability by setting no more than a time frame in which the participants are free to contribute in their own time. Asynchronous meetings are a good option when reflected input is required rather than instant spontaneous interaction.

Technically, synchronous and asynchronous meetings differ by the time for which tools are available to the participants. In a typical synchronous meeting, all participants are active in one shared activity. For this, synchronous meetings usually require support by a voice conference for oral interaction within the group and screen sharing by web conference for presenting non-EMS content.

In contrast, asynchronous sessions often involve multiple activities for contribution. The actual meeting and direct interaction between two or more participants in a particular activity are coincidental. Asynchronous sessions are often employed for gathering feedback or input. Asynchronous sessions can be conducted independently of synchronous meetings or in the run-up to such meetings or in the aftermath, e.g. to discuss questions unresolved in the meeting.

EMS differ substantially in the way and the extent to which they support asynchronous meetings. Differences include the duration of asynchronous meetings (24 hours/days/weeks), support for planning and publication of asynchronous meetings (agenda, invitations) and the licensing model (flat-rate, pay-per-use, concurrent meetings, concurrent users, etc.).

== Advantages ==
Electronic meeting systems have been designed to enhance group effectiveness, efficiency and satisfaction. Face-to-face groups can suffer from a number of process losses including:

- domination of the conversation by one or more members
- individuals withholding comments for fear of criticism or negative evaluation
- members failing to participate because they perceive that their input is not required
- pressure to conform with senior members of the group

Consequently, the advantages of EMS supported meetings vs traditional face-to-face meetings and workshops are:

- increased openness and less personal prejudice through anonymity
- any-place (online) capability which avoids travel time and cost
- increased participant availability (any place, any time).
- increased interactivity and participation by parallelization
- more sophisticated analysis by voting and analysis in real time
- less effort in preparation by using meeting templates
- repeatable meeting and workshop process through meeting templates
- automatic, comprehensive, neutral documentation

== Disadvantages ==
The majority of drawbacks of EMS versus traditional conferences or workshops have been overcome by technological progress or by adaptation of EMS to particular target groups and their dominant use cases:

- the formerly high infrastructure requirements have been reduced to Internet access and a web browser
- the formerly high demands on facilitators have been greatly reduced in systems that are designed to support everyday use by the non-expert user
- the traditional cultural barriers to the use of technology in meetings have been overcome through the general familiarization of users with telephone and web conferences.

The remaining drawbacks mostly result from the physical distribution of the participants when meeting online. Video conferences can only make up in part for not meeting in person.
