= Mor Naaman =

Israeli information scientist

Mor Naaman (Hebrew: מור נעמן; born 4 December 1971) is a professor of information science at Cornell Tech. He is the founder of the Connective Media Hub and director of the Connective Media degree program. Naaman is known for foundational work on tagging behavior on social networking sites, the use of sites such as Twitter as social awareness streams, and real-world identification from social network activity. His research in these areas has been cited over 12,000 times on Google Scholar.

Naaman is known for being the co-creator, along with Jeffrey Boase and Chih-Hui Lai, of the term "meformer", a play on the word "informer" that describes a social media user who posts content meant to notify others of their personal status rather than to convey information. The highly cited paper also posited the idea of social media feeds as "social awareness streams".

== Education ==
Naaman received a Ph.D in Computer Science from Stanford University in 2005, where he was advised by computer scientist Héctor García-Molina. He also earned an undergraduate degree from Tel Aviv University.

== Career ==
Between 2005 and 2008, Naaman held a position at Yahoo! Research Berkeley, where his work focused on automated tagging and classification of photos. He participated in the development of Yahoo's now-defunct location sharing platform Fire Eagle. In 2008, he became an assistant professor at Rutgers University's School of Communication and Information, which he held for five years until becoming one of the first faculty members at Cornell Tech in 2013.

Naaman participated in the founding of several startups. He was the co-founder (along with Tarikh Korula) and Chief Scientist of Mahaya Inc, a media aggregation and ranking service, which created the event-based photo aggregation app Seen. In 2014, Seen received $1.25 million in venture funding from Horizons Ventures and KEC Ventures and was used for live event aggregation by customers such as The Bowery Presents and Governors Ball Music Festival.

Naaman is the lead organizer for the Tech, Media, and Democracy course, a partnership between six New York City universities (Cornell Tech, Columbia, CUNY, NYU, The New School, and Pratt Institute). The course combines journalistic and computational methods to teach students interested in media and technology about issues relating to credibility and misinformation, protection of media and journalists, media business models, and technology that supports journalism.

In 2018, Naaman served as a General Chair of the ACM Conference on Computer-Supported Cooperative Work and Social Computing.

At Cornell Tech, Naaman is the director of the Connected Experiences Lab and the Social Technologies Lab.

== Honors and awards ==
Naaman has received several awards for his work, including a Google Faculty Research Award in 2016. In 2025, Naaman was elected an ACM Distinguished Member.

== Basketball ==
Naaman played professional basketball in his native Israel, for various teams in the Israeli Basketball Premier League between 1993 and 1998. He retired from basketball to focus on his academic career.
