= Banting and Best Centre for Innovation and Entrepreneurship =

- Type: Business accelerator
- Founded: September 2012
- Headquarters: Banting and Best buildings on College Street, Toronto

The Banting and Best Centre for Innovation and Entrepreneurship is an initiative of the University of Toronto which facilitates business mentorship and the development of commercially viable innovations. The goal of the Centre is to foster startup companies by supporting new ideas as they are developed and then during the incubation phase on through commercialization.

== History ==
The centre was launched in September 2012, in the Banting and Best buildings on College Street, Toronto. The 50,000 square foot Centre was named after Frederick Banting and Charles Best, co-discoverers of insulin, a treatment for diabetes developed in 1921.

The Centre, managed by the University of Toronto, set up facilities to foster collaborative work between students, faculty and private enterprise by providing office space, courses and equipment. The centre has also provided jobs for students and recent graduates of the university.

Soon after its establishment, the centre began raising money from private investors to fund startup companies. During the first year about $23 million was raised. As of 2016, the centre operates nine business accelerators.
