= Jaime Teevan =

American computer scientist (born 1976)

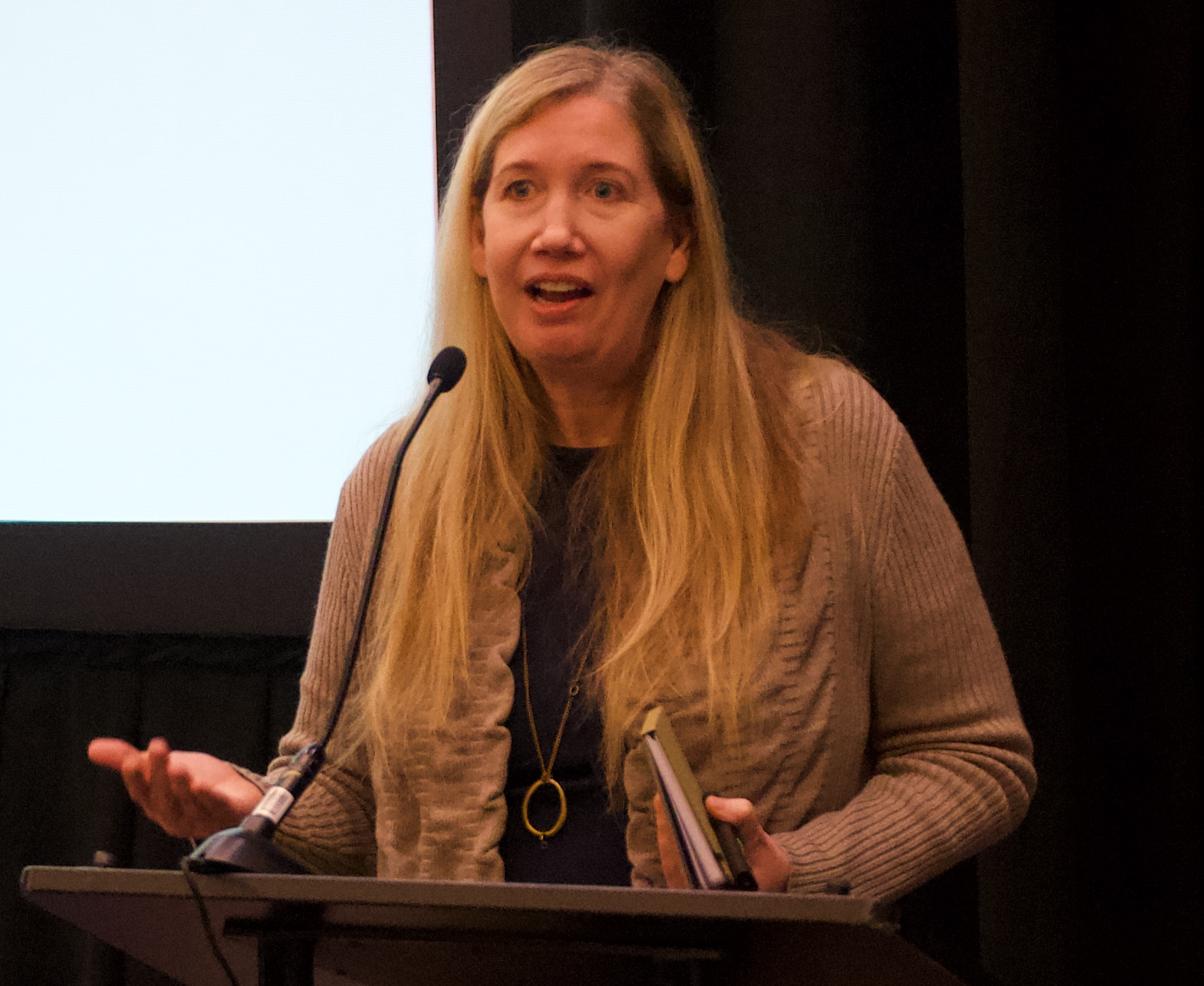
- Teevan speaking at the AEA Conference in 2025
- Born: 1976 (age 49–50)
- Education: Yale University (BS); Massachusetts Institute of Technology (PhD)
- Awards: TR35 (2009); Borg Early Career Award (2014); Karen Spärck Jones Award (2016); ACM Fellow (2022); SIGIR Academy (2022); CHI Academy (2022); TIME 100 AI (2023)
- Scientific career
- Fields: Computer science Human-Computer Interaction; Information Retrieval
- Workplaces: Microsoft Research
- Doctoral advisor: David Karger
- Website: teevan.org

Jaime Teevan (born 1976) is an American computer scientist and Microsoft executive known for her work on AI and productivity.

== Education and background ==
Teevan received a B.S. in Computer Science from Yale University. As an undergraduate, she sold her senior thesis to Infoseek, an early web search engine. In it she invented an early approach to using the web link graph to support information seeking.

Teevan also received a Ph.D. and S.M. from MIT where she helped pioneer the field of Personal Information Management.

== Career ==
Teevan spent a number of years as a researcher at Microsoft Research, where she has studied various aspects of human-computer interaction, information retrieval, and computer-supported cooperative work. Her work has focused on how to help people find, manage, and use information more effectively, especially in the context of time constraints, personal preferences, and collaborative settings.

From 2017 to 2018, Teevan served as Technical Adviser to Microsoft CEO Satya Nadella. She was his first technical advisor with a background in AI.

She is currently Microsoft's Chief Scientist and was inaugurated as a Microsoft Technical Fellow in 2022. As Microsoft has doubled down on AI-driven products and integrated research more tightly into Microsoft products, Jaime has been one of the key people driving that shift. According to Business Insider, "she's the brains behind Microsoft's productivity innovations."

Following the COVID-19 pandemic, Teevan lead Microsoft's Future of Work initiative to bring together researchers from Microsoft, LinkedIn, and GitHub to study how the pandemic has changed work. This led to innovations in Microsoft products, including, for example, better technological support for hybrid meetings.

Starting in Fall 2022, Teevan led the early M365 Copilot work to integrate the latest AI into Microsoft's core products. During this period, she focused on seamlessly embedding AI technologies into tools like Word, Excel, and Teams. In an interview with Reid Hoffman recorded on the day M365 Copilot launched, Teevan spoke about her experience bringing generative AI to Microsoft products. She participated in the announcement of M365 Copilot to talk about the "art and science underlying Copilot."

== Research and awards ==
Teevan has published over 100 papers at international conferences and journals and received many awards for her papers. Much of her work focuses on information retrieval, human-computer interaction, and the future of work. She co-authored the first book on collaborative information seeking, and edited a book on Personal Information Management (PIM).

Teevan is particularly known for the work she has done on personalized search. According to the Technology Review, Teevan "is a leader in using data about people's knowledge, preferences, and habits to help them manage information."

Teevan also works on 'microproductivity,' breaking down complex tasks into a series of microtasks that can be completed more easily and efficiently. She developed the concept of selfsourcing, where microtasks are completed by the task owner rather than crowd workers. A 2017 article in the New York Magazine quotes her as saying, "I could probably pretty easily find an extra hour in my day at work, just in these little micro-moments of time when I’m not being productive."

Teevan was named a Technology Review (TR35) 2009 Young Innovator for her research on personalized search and received the CRA-W Borg Early Career Award (BECA) in 2014. In 2016 she received the Karen Spärck Jones award from the British Computer Society for her "technically strong and exceptionally creative contributions to the intersection of information retrieval, user experience and social media."

In 2022, she was inaugurated as a Microsoft Technical Fellow, and named to the 2022 class of ACM Fellows, "for contributions to human-computer interaction, information retrieval, and productivity". That same year she also became a member of the SIGCHI and SIGIR Academies. In 2023 she was featured in TIME's first ever list of the 100 most influential people in artificial intelligence.

Teevan served on the board of the Computing Research Association (CRA) from 2017-2025. In 2025, she was elected to serve as the alumni fellow on the board of the Yale Corporation, Yale University’s governing body.

== Personal ==
Teevan is married to Alexander Hehmeyer. The couple live in Bellevue, Washington and have four children. Teevan is an advocate for helping researchers successfully integrate parenthood and academic efforts.
