= Digital collaboration =

Digital collaboration is using digital technologies for collaboration. Dramatically different from traditional collaboration, it connects a broader network of participants who can accomplish much more than they would on their own. Digital Collaboration is used in many fields, for example digital collaboration in classrooms.

== Examples ==
- Online meetings and webinars
- Online team chatrooms
- Co-authoring documents and shared spreadsheets
- Social media
- Shared task lists or issue tracking systems
- Wikis
- Email
- Digital Collaboration in Classrooms

== Background ==
21st century mobile devices such as apps, social media, bandwidth and open data, connect people on a global level. This has led to an increase in information and at the same time increased levels of stress. As a result, workplace innovators and visionaries want to discover new digital tools and are rethinking how, when and where they work.

== Processes ==
=== E-mail ===
A collaborative system through electronic devices which allows users to exchange messages and information online by way of computer, tablet, or smartphone. Users develop accounts and use E-mail for work and leisure related topics. A great reliance is placed on e-mail to communicate, gone are the days when a message can go unread. Adapting digital tools such as notetaking apps, task lists and ical to David Allen's Getting Things Done (GTD) productivity workflow, users can find "weird time", to process the e-mail in box. GTD principles can be difficult to maintain over the long term. Examples of providers for e-mail are Gmail, Comcast, and Outlook.

=== Social media ===
Social Media networks foster collaboration as well as manage and share knowledge between peers and interested groups. Participation in these networks builds trust among peers, which leads to open sharing of ideas. News and information can be activity filtered through subscription, allowing users to focus on what interests them, as opposed to passively receiving information. Events, activities, files and discussions are searchable and presented as a timeline. Platforms such as Facebook, Twitter, and Instagram bring users together by connecting them on the internet.

=== Open data sources ===
Applications that can deliver data to help make decisions. Public agencies and GIS services provide, what was once thought of as proprietary data, to the private sector developers to present useful context and decision-making. People themselves can also provide data about their location or experience, which has social value to interested users.

=== Wikis ===
Wikis are websites which allow collaborative modification of its content and structure directly from the web browser. In a typical wiki, text is written using a simplified markup language—known as "wiki markup"—and often edited with the help of a rich-text editor. A wiki is run using wiki software, otherwise known as a wiki engine. There are a large number of different wiki engines, both as standalone software and extensions to other programs, such as bug tracking systems. Some wiki engines are open source, whereas others are proprietary.

== See also ==
- Cloud collaboration
- Collaborative consumption
- Collaborative editing
- Collaborative software
- Collaborative writing
- Commons-based peer production
- Document collaboration
- Mass collaboration
- Open collaboration
- Open-source model
- Open-source software movement
