= Fire Eagle =

- Website type: Location-based services
- Available in: English
- Owner: Yahoo!
- Website: www.fireeagle.com
- Commercial: Yes
- Registration: Required
- Launched: August 12, 2008 (beta March 2007)
- Current status: Closed February 2013

Fire Eagle was a Yahoo! owned service that stores a user's location and shares it with other authorized services. It was created by a team which included among others Tom Coates, Simon Willison and Mor Naaman.

A user could authorize other services and applications to update or access this information via the Fire Eagle API, allowing a user to update their location once and then use it on any Fire Eagle enabled-website. The intention of Fire Eagle was to serve as a central broker for location data. Services which supported Fire Eagle included Pownce, Dopplr, Brightkite and Movable Type.

The Fire Eagle service was one of the first sites to use the OAuth protocol to connect services together.

The service shut down in February 2013.
