= Narayanan Shivakumar =

American computer scientist

Shiva Shivakumar is an entrepreneur that worked for Google between 2001 and 2010. He was a Vice President of Engineering and Distinguished Entrepreneur, helped build Google's R&D centers at Seattle-Kirkland, Zurich, and Bangalore; he and his teams launched AdSense, Dremel, Sitemaps , Google Search Appliance and other key products.

Before he joined Google in its early days, he obtained his PhD in computer science from Stanford University. His advisor was Prof. Hector Garcia-Molina. Before Google, he cofounded Gigabeat.com, an online music startup acquired by Napster.
