= Héctor García-Molina =

Mexican computer scientist (1954–2019)

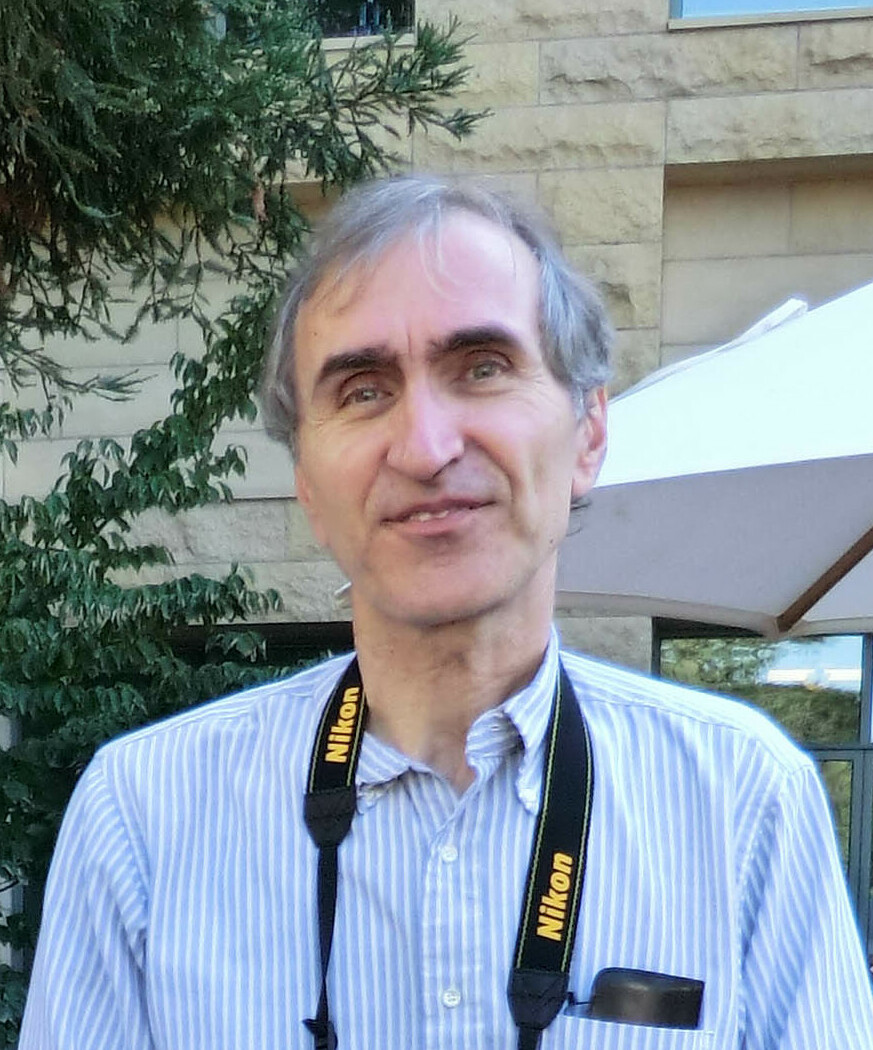
- García-Molina (2011)
- Born: 26 November 1954; Monterrey, Mexico
- Died: 25 November 2019 (aged 64–65)
- Education: Monterrey Institute of Technology and Higher Education (BS) Stanford University (MS, PhD)
- Known for: Distributed databases
- Awards: ACM SIGMOD Edgar F. Codd Innovations Award (1999)
- Scientific career
- Fields: Computer science
- Workplaces: Stanford University
- Doctoral advisor: Gio Wiederhold
- Doctoral students: Robert Abbott, Sergey Brin, Edward Y. Chang, Neil Daswani, Susan B. Davidson, Boris Kogan, Mor Naaman, Narayanan Shivakumar, Mayank Bawa

Héctor García-Molina (26 November 1954 – 25 November 2019) was a Mexican computer scientist and Professor in the Departments of Computer Science and Electrical Engineering at Stanford University. He was the advisor to Google co-founder Sergey Brin from 1993 to 1997 when Brin was a computer science student at Stanford.

== Biography ==
Born in Monterrey, Nuevo León, Mexico, García-Molina graduated in 1974 with a bachelor's degree in Electrical Engineering from the Monterrey Institute of Technology and Higher Studies (ITESM) and received both a master's degree in Electrical Engineering (1975) and a doctorate in Computer Science (1979) from Stanford University.

From 1979 to 1991, García-Molina worked as a professor of the Computer Science Department at Princeton University in New Jersey. In 1992 he joined the faculty of Stanford University as the Leonard Bosack and Sandra Lerner Professor in the Departments of Computer Science and Electrical Engineering and has served as Director of the Computer Systems Laboratory (August 1994 – December 1997) and as chairman of the Computer Science Department from (January 2001 – December 2004). During 1994–1998, he was Principal Investigator for the Stanford Digital Library Project, the project from which the Google search engine emerged.

García-Molina served at the U.S. President's Information Technology Advisory Committee (PITAC) from 1997 to 2001 and was a member of Oracle Corporation's Board of Directors beginning in October 2001 until his death.

García-Molina was also a Fellow member of the Association for Computing Machinery, the American Academy of Arts and Sciences and a member of the National Academy of Engineering. He was a Venture Advisor for Diamondhead Ventures and ONSET Ventures. In 1999 he was laureated with the ACM SIGMOD Innovations Award.

García-Molina died of cancer on the eve of his 65th birthday.

== Awards ==
- (2010) VLDB 10-year Best Paper Award for the paper entitled "The Evolution of the Web and Implications for an Incremental Crawler" in VLDB 2000.
- (2009) SIGMOD Best Demo Award for the demo entitled "CourseRank: A Social System for Course Planning".
- (2007) ICDE Influential Paper Award for the paper entitled "Disk Striping" in ICDE 1986. This early paper on disk striping significantly influenced subsequent work on RAID storage.
- (2007) Honorary doctorate from ETH Zurich for outstanding work in computer science.
