= E-professional =

E-professional or "eprofessional" or even "eProfessional" is a term used in Europe to describe a professional whose work relies on concepts of remote work: working at a distance using information technology and communications technology, as well as online collaboration (i.e. virtual team, mass collaboration, massively distributed collaboration, online community of practice such as the open source community, and open innovation principles.

The concept of e-professional, strongly related to the concept of remote work, extends the traditional concept of professional in including any type of expert or knowledge worker intensively using ICT (Information and Communications Technology) environments and tools in their working practices.

An eprofessional is a member of at least one community of practice which confers him the title of professional and can be either a freelancer or an employed worker. An e-professional is not working in isolation but actively collaborating with other e-professionals within virtual workspaces called collaborative working environments (CWE).
