= Medical CSCW =

The global healthcare industry is charging ahead on the path to practice-wide and nationwide computerization on the heels of developments in electronic health record, medical imaging, and ubiquitous computing fields. While the prospects for benefits such as increased quality of care and increased return on investments abound, the critical need to deal with the underlying socio-technical implications of these technologies and how they affect workflow, coordination, and collaboration in medical practice must be addressed by systems designers, healthcare decision makers, and care providers.

Medical computer supported cooperative work, or medical CSCW is a term that may be used to describe this area of research.

Methodology

Much of the research in CSCW is based on ethnographic methods for investigating organizational and technological settings. These methods include qualitative data collection through observation, participant observation, and semi-structured interviews, as well as analysis using a grounded theory approach.
