= Susan B. Davidson =

American computer scientist

- Education: Cornell University; Princeton University
- Known for: Databases, Bioinformatics
- Awards: ACM Fellow (2001); CorrFRSE (2014); AAAS Fellow (2021)
- Scientific career
- Fields: Computer Science
- Workplaces: University of Pennsylvania
- Doctoral advisor: Hector Garcia-Molina
- Website: www.cis.upenn.edu/~susan/home.html

Susan B. Davidson CorrFRSE is an American computer scientist known for work in databases and bioinformatics. She is Weiss Professor of Computer and Information Science at University of Pennsylvania. Her dissertation work on distributed databases included results on statistical and mathematical techniques for data resolution as well as mechanisms to avoid database conflicts.

Davidson has also done research in bioinformatics, where her work (with collaborators) on data integration was commercialized by GeneticXChange. She also serves on the board of the Computing Research Association.

== Biography ==
In 1978 Davidson graduated with a B.A. in mathematics from Cornell University. She received M.S.E. and Master of Arts degrees in computer science from Princeton University in 1980 and a Ph.D. in computer science from Princeton University in 1982.

Davidson joined the faculty at the University of Pennsylvania as visiting assistant professor (1982), then took up the role of assistant professor (1983–1989), associate professor (1989–1998), and professor (1998–present) in the university's Department of Computer and Information Science. From 2008 to 2013, she was chair of the department. From 2000 to 2003, she also held a secondary appointment in the university's Genetics Department.

== Awards ==
In 2001 Davidson became a Fellow of the Association for Computing Machinery (ACM). She was elected a Corresponding Fellow of the Royal Society of Edinburgh in 2015. She was named to the 2021 class of Fellows of the American Association for the Advancement of Science.
