= Collaborative workflow =

Convergence of social software with service management software

Collaborative workflow is the convergence of social software with service management (workflow) software. As the definition implies, collaborative workflow is derived from both workflow software and social software such as chat, instant messaging, and document collaboration.

== Defining ==
To define collaborative workflow, we can examine the definitions of its components: workflow and collaboration objects.

=== Workflow ===
Workflow is a set of activities (service requests, tasks) and the rules that govern their behavior as they move from one service provider to the next until a project is completed.

=== Collaboration objects ===
Collaboration objects include web-based meetings, instant messaging, knowledge management wikis, documents (ECM), and shared calendars.

=== Goal ===
The goal of collaborative workflow is to provide synergetic efficiency gains to its constituents (social communication and service management) by:

- Improving effectiveness on joint tasks by removing the communication barriers between team members
- Minimizing organizational boundaries and information silos
- Allowing online social interaction to be goal oriented, structured, and measured

Ideally, collaborative workflow is a collection of parallel and sequential tasks that rely on communication and coordination to achieve a desired outcome.

== History ==
=== The data center ===
Prior to the 1980s all IT operations were performed at the data center. Often perceived as faceless and monolithic, the data center was a corporate division housing fields of mainframe computers humming softly in locked rooms with raised floors. Workers regarded this insulated, air-conditioned computer room as an unresponsive ivory tower ruled by corporate information gatekeepers.

=== The IBM PC ===
The introduction of the IBM PC in the early 1980s sparked a renaissance in computing. The personal computer ushered in a power shift from the data center to the knowledge workers (the people who used the data to provide services throughout the company). This radical change led to the democratization of computing, but in the short run led to a period of chaos.

=== The democratization of computing ===
The democratization of computing resources and the empowerment of knowledge workers was an exciting development, and little notice was initially paid to the havoc it was causing in the workplace. The new model lacked standards, was fraught with trial and error, and required an ever growing level of support. This support came not only from the computer department, but increasingly from fellow team members. Peer support, although not explicitly shown in financial statements, led to an alarming drop in worker productivity.

=== Technical support ===
By the early 1990s, studies published by respected consulting groups stated that organizations were spending a shocking amount of money on peer and informal technical support – about three times the amount that was spent on hardware (when a typical IBM PC cost about $5000). Many managers felt that the PC revolution had gotten out of control.

=== The help desk ===
It was against this backdrop, and especially when companies started implementing local area networks, that the modern help desk was born. The corporate data center had disappeared and the resulting power vacuum needed to be filled. Many corporations resolved their data management issues by standardizing and automating processes.

In the United Kingdom, the Office of Government Commerce created ITIL. ITIL promoted standard practices in the deployment and management of IT resources.

=== Simple workflow models ===
The early help desks of the 1980s incorporated simple workflow models: problems were reported, dispatched, routed to a technician, resolved, and then closed. As decentralized computing matured, customized workflow solutions such as change management, configuration management, and problem management, enabled the IT department to focus on its primary objectives – resolving problems, and rolling out new applications faster, more reliably, and with greater ease.

Workflow applications brought to the modern enterprise what Henry Ford's assembly line brought to manufacturing: improved efficiency, uniform outcomes, and greater throughput.

=== The advent of social software and software for social collaboration ===
As with all new technologies, social software went through a lengthy gestation period. Even before the widespread adoption of the Internet, social software was maturing and gaining a foothold with outfits like CompuServe and America Online. Before long, people were contributing to interest groups, using email and bulletin boards, and hanging out in chat rooms.

The latest generation of decision makers has embraced the social communication and collaboration media that grew from popular developments such as interest groups and Wikipedia. For this reason, enterprises have recognized the collaborative value of social software, and have begun using it within their existing IT structures.

== Attributes of a collaborative workflow management system ==
The attributes of a collaborative workflow management system include:

- Collaboration to accomplish defined goals or tasks
- Management of a collaborative goal, task, or project from start to finish
- Integration of collaboration and workflow objects within a secure framework for enterprise applications
- Project and task infrastructure enabling work to be accomplished in an organized fashion (in contrast to pure-play social software)
- Skill-based task assignment to teams or individuals
- Ad hoc projects that span organizational boundaries, and minimize information silos

== Differences between social collaboration software and collaborative workflow software ==
The fundamental difference between social collaboration software and collaborative workflow software is that collaborative workflow is characterized by well-defined goals, activities, and outcomes. Collaborative workflow, while incorporating many of the tools that comprise social collaboration, also relies on:

- Project and task infrastructures
- Role-Based Access Control (RBAC)
- Business rules to control workflow capabilities

== How it works ==
Collaborative workflow involves:

- The integration of collaborative objects (social software) with workflow management
- The transfer of information, documents, tasks, or objects from one step to the next
- Multiple participants working toward a predefined goal, both in parallel and sequentially
- Collaboration across organizational boundaries
- Project-oriented and task-oriented collaboration

== In the workplace ==
With collaborative workflow, managers can oversee an entire project using both traditional methods (project design, reports, and dashboards) as well as collaboration tools (web-based chat, instant messaging, document management, alerts, and shared calendars). Supported by role-based access control (RBAC), ad hoc teams can collaborate on special projects within traditional departmental structures.

=== Implementation phases ===
The phases of implementing collaborative workflows include:

- Planning and setup
- Project/task instantiation
- Execution

=== Planning and setup ===
- Design a model of the organizational hierarchy
- Assign members to skill teams (possibly across organizational boundaries)
- Use role-based access control (RBAC) to define who can access which part of the system, and in what capacity
- Develop skill-based queue folders to facilitate the forwarding of work so that appropriate team members can access it and perform the required tasks
- Use multi-task project templates, such as employee onboarding procedures, to facilitate quick instantiation of standard processes, while avoiding reinvention of the wheel, and promoting uniform outcomes
- Apply business rules to regulate workflow by creating alerts, initiating automatic workflow changes, and issuing communications in response to predefined conditions

=== Project/task instantiation ===
- Instantiate the project/task manually from a template, or automatically through a business rule
- Specify the required outcomes and set the priorities
- Based on the skills required, route the tasks to appropriate queue folders for processing

=== Execution ===
- Work on the task, while logging task activities
- Tag documents, add them to the task, check them out, and update as required
- Schedule task-related team meetings and appointments as needed, with content and outcomes forming part of the task documentation history

Team members communicate online with each other via social software, with the help of document management and shared calendaring facilities.

== ROI for social collaboration software ==
Social collaboration software tools have yet to prove their worth, because they are not structured or goal oriented. They need the constraints of stated goals, commitments, timelines, and performance measurements, so they can align with the productivity goals of workflow components. Until these constraints are adopted at the enterprise level, the benefits of social media will remain anecdotal.

== The world as a service desk ==
Industrialized economies have a massive service sector component. Each year, the Fortune 500 list of service-based companies continues to grow while the list of manufacturing companies shrinks.

Manufacturing firms are now maintaining sizable service components such as marketing, customer service, technical service, and legal support. Companies are manufacturing the physical stuff abroad and developing the services back home. By bundling services with products, companies have realized huge profits, offering packages such as protection plans for television sets, or two-year phone contracts that come with free smart phones. Consumers have expressed mixed opinions on the value of these bundled services.

Firm-level evidence from U.S. multinationals found that production stages intensive in routine tasks were more likely to be performed by foreign affiliates, whereas stages intensive in non-routine tasks were more likely to remain at U.S. headquarters. Related research found that goods and services requiring direct communication with consumers were more likely to be produced in the destination market, while activities requiring complex within-firm communication were more likely to be performed at headquarters and exported.

Many organizations may be service providers for one another. To gain and maintain a global competitive advantage, businesses may need to provide better services that cost less. In a technologically complex world, this means using both collaborative tools and a procedural framework to deliver greater value at a competitive price.

To be effective, the enterprise collaborative workflow solution should include:

- A goal-oriented support system for projects and tasks
- A security network that enables people to collaborate across organizational corporate boundaries, while retaining confidentiality
- Role-based access control (RBAC) providing team members with access to specific tasks, documents, and calendar items
- Communication tools to promote teamwork within the project/task infrastructure
- Document management allowing multiple users to coordinate tasks and workflow
- Communication via LAN, WAN, Web, and mobile devices

Collaborative workflow promises to enhance business processes through the integration of collaboration tools. Used properly, it has the potential to improve service, productivity, and efficiency by reducing information silos and lessening the conventional business friction points of time, space, and organizational structure.

== See also ==
- Workflow
- Collaborative software
  - Project management software
  - Workflow management system
- Business rules engine
- Information silo
