= Integrated collaboration environment =

An integrated collaboration environment (ICE) is an environment in which a virtual team does its work. Such environments allow companies to realize a number of competitive advantages by using their existing computers and network infrastructure for group and personal collaboration. These fully featured environments combine the best features of web-based conferencing and collaboration, desktop videoconferencing, and instant message into a single easy-to-use, intuitive environment. Recent developments have allowed companies include streaming in real-time and archived modes into their ICE.

Common applications found within ICE are:

1. Collaborative software designed to improve the performance of teams by supporting the sharing and flow of information. It allows for real-time collaboration and conferencing.
2. Workflow systems facilitate the automation and management of business processes.
3. Documentation management systems manage a document through all the stages of its processing.
4. Peer-to-peer collaboration software permits users to communicate in real time and share files without going through a central server.
5. Knowledge management systems are information technology (IT) systems that support the capture, organization, and distribution of knowledge (know-how).
6. Social network systems are IT systems that link people to others they know and, from there, to people their contacts know. It is a way to leverage personal and professional contacts.

ICE allows organizations to take advantage of technological advances in computer processing power and video technology while maintaining backward compatibility with existing standards-based hardware conference equipment. ICE can reduce costs for a company. These benefits are achieved through cross discipline fertilization, which allows knowledge workers to share information across departments of a company, which can be important for ensuring that corporate goals are shared and fully integrated.

There can be challenges to implementing ICE due to employees' lack of acceptance of knowledge management systems. Studies have shown that that lack of commitment and motivation by knowledge workers, professionals, and managers is the reason for problems, not the knowledge management technologies. Possible reasons for the lack of acceptance include:

- People do not realize how important the knowledge they possess actually is and therefore do not submit it to the knowledge repository.
- People believe that "knowledge is power" and are reluctant to share what they know with others.
- People do not have time to submit information. Technology can help with this problem. By being closely tied to existing working practices, knowledge management applications transparently capture and store information in the repository.

== See also ==
- Collaborative workspace
- Integrated development environment

=== Specific systems ===
- Collabora Online is an online office suite that allows collaborative real-time editing of word processing documents, spreadsheet, presentations and vector graphics, it can be integrated into any web page e.g. Nextcloud, ownCloud, Moodle, Drupal, Alfresco, Mattermost, OpenText, Nuxeo, EGroupware and others.
- FirstClass
