= Mass collaboration =

Many people working on a single project

Mass collaboration is a form of collective action that occurs when large numbers of people work independently on a single project, often modular in its nature. Such projects typically take place on the internet using social software and computer-supported collaboration tools such as wiki technologies, which provide a potentially infinite hypertextual substrate within which the collaboration may be situated. Open source software such as Linux was developed via mass collaboration.

== Factors ==
=== Modularity ===
Modularity enables a mass of experiments to proceed in parallel, with different teams working on the same modules, each proposing different solutions. Modularity allows different "blocks" to be easily assembled, facilitating decentralised innovation that all fits together.

== Differences ==
=== Cooperation ===
Mass collaboration differs from mass cooperation in that the creative acts taking place require the joint development of shared understandings. Conversely, group members involved in cooperation needn't engage in a joint negotiation of understanding; they may simply execute instructions willingly.

Another important distinction is the borders around which a mass cooperation can be defined. Due to the extremely general characteristics and lack of need for fine grain negotiation and consensus when cooperating, the entire internet, a city, and even the global economy may be regarded as examples of mass cooperation. Thus mass collaboration is more refined and complex in its process and production on the level of collective engagement.

=== Online forum ===
Although an online discussion is certainly collaborative, mass collaboration differs from a large forum, email list, bulletin board, chat session or group discussion in that the discussion's structure of separate, individual posts generated through turn-taking communication means the textual content does not take the form of a single, coherent body. Of course the conceptual domain of the overall discussion exists as a single unified body, however the textual contributors can be linked back to the understandings and interpretations of a single author. Though the author's understandings and interpretations are most certainly a negotiation of the understandings of all who read and contribute to the discussion, the fact that there was only one author of a given entry reduces the entry's collaborative complexity to the discursive/interpretive as opposed to constructive/‘negotiative’ levels

=== Coauthoring ===
From the perspective of individual sites of work within a mass collaboration, the activity may appear to be identical to that of coauthoring. In fact, it is, with the exception being the implicit and explicit relationships formed by the interdependence that many sites within a mass collaboration share through hypertext and coauthorship with differing sets of collaborators. This interdependence of collaborative sites coauthored by a large number of people is what gives a mass collaboration one of its most distinguishing features - a coherent collaboration emerging from the interrelated collection of its parts.

=== Collective online tools ===
Many of the web applications associated with Bulletin boards, or forums can include a wide variety of tools that allows individuals to keep track of sites and content that they find on the internet. Users are able to bookmark from their browser by editing the title, adding a description and most importantly classifying using tags. Other non-collective tools are also used in Mass collaborative environments such as commenting, rating and quick evaluation.

== Changes ==
=== Business ===
In the books Wikinomics: How Mass Collaboration Changes Everything and MacroWikinomics-Rebooting business and the world, Don Tapscott and Anthony Williams list five ideas that the new art and science of wikinomics is based on:

- being open
- interdependence

The concept of mass collaboration has led to a number of efforts to harness and commercialize shared tasks. Collectively known as crowdsourcing, these ventures typically involve on an online system of accounts for coordinating buyers and sellers of labor. Amazon's Mechanical Turk system follows this model, by enabling employers to distribute minute tasks to thousands of registered workers. In the advertising industry, Giant Hydra employs mass collaboration to enable creatives to collaborate on advertising ideas online and create what they call an 'idea matrix', a highly complex node of concepts, executions and ideas all connected to each other. In the financial industry, companies such as the Open Models Valuation Company (OMVCO) also employ mass collaboration to improve the accuracy of financial forecasts.

== The role of discussion ==
In traditional collaborative scenarios, discussion plays a key role in the negotiation of jointly developed, shared understandings (the essence of collaboration), acting as a point of mediation between the individual collaborators and the outcome which may or may not eventuate from the discussions. Mass collaboration reverses this relationship with the work being done providing the point of mediation between collaborators, with associated discussions being an optional component. It is of course debatable that discussion is optimal, as most (if not all) mass collaborations have discussions associated with the content being developed. However it is possible to contribute (to Wikipedia for instance) without discussing the content you are contributing to. (Smaller scale collaborations might be conducted without discussions especially in a non-verbal mode of work - imagine two painters contributing to the same canvas - but the situation becomes increasingly problematic as more members are included.)

== Non-textual ==
Although the only widely successful examples of mass collaboration thus far evaluated exist in the textual medium, there is no immediate reason why this form of collective action couldn't work in other creative media. It could be argued that some projects within the open source software movement provide examples of mass collaboration outside of the traditional written language (see below), however, the code collaboratively created still exists as a language utilizing a textual medium. Music is also a possible medium for mass collaboration, for instance on live performance recordings where audience members' voices have become part of the standard version of a song. Most "anonymous" folk songs and "traditional" tunes are also arguably sites of long term mass collaboration.

== See also ==
- Cloud computing
- Collaborative fiction
- Collective intelligence
- Crowdmapping
- Digital collaboration
- Distributed collaboration
- Decentralized knowledge
- Fisheries co-management
- GitHub
- Human flesh search engine
- Intelligence agency
- Mass communication
- Open collaboration
- Peer production
- SCP Foundation
- Think tanks

== Bibliography ==
- A. Désilets; L. Gonzalez; S. Paquet; M. Stojanovic (2006). "Translation the Wiki way". Proceedings of the 2006 international symposium on Wikis (PDF). p. 19. doi:10.1145/1149453.1149464. ISBN 978-1595934130. S2CID 3080602. Archived from the original (PDF) on 2014-05-12.
- A. Désilets (2007). "Translation Wikified: How will Massive Online Collaboration Impact the World of Translation?". Proceedings of Translating and the Computer. Archived from the original on 2011-07-20.
- Leadbeater, Charles (2008). We-Think – Mass innovation not mass production. Profile Books. ISBN 978-1-86197-892-9.
- Leimeister, J. M.; Huber, M.; Bretschneider, U.; Krcmar, H. (2009). "Leveraging Crowdsourcing: Activation-Supporting Components for IT-Based Ideas Competition". Journal of Management Information Systems. 26: 197–224. doi:10.2753/MIS0742-1222260108. S2CID 17485373. Archived from the original on 2010-01-23.
- Laurie Taylor (Presenter), Charles Leadbeater (Guest) (2008-03-05). Thinking Allowed (Radio). London, UK: BBC Radio 4. Event occurs at start.
- Cress, Ulrike, Johannes Moskaliuk, and Heisawn Jeong, (2016) Mass collaboration and education. Springer, 2016.
