= History of hypertext =

Aspect of Internet history

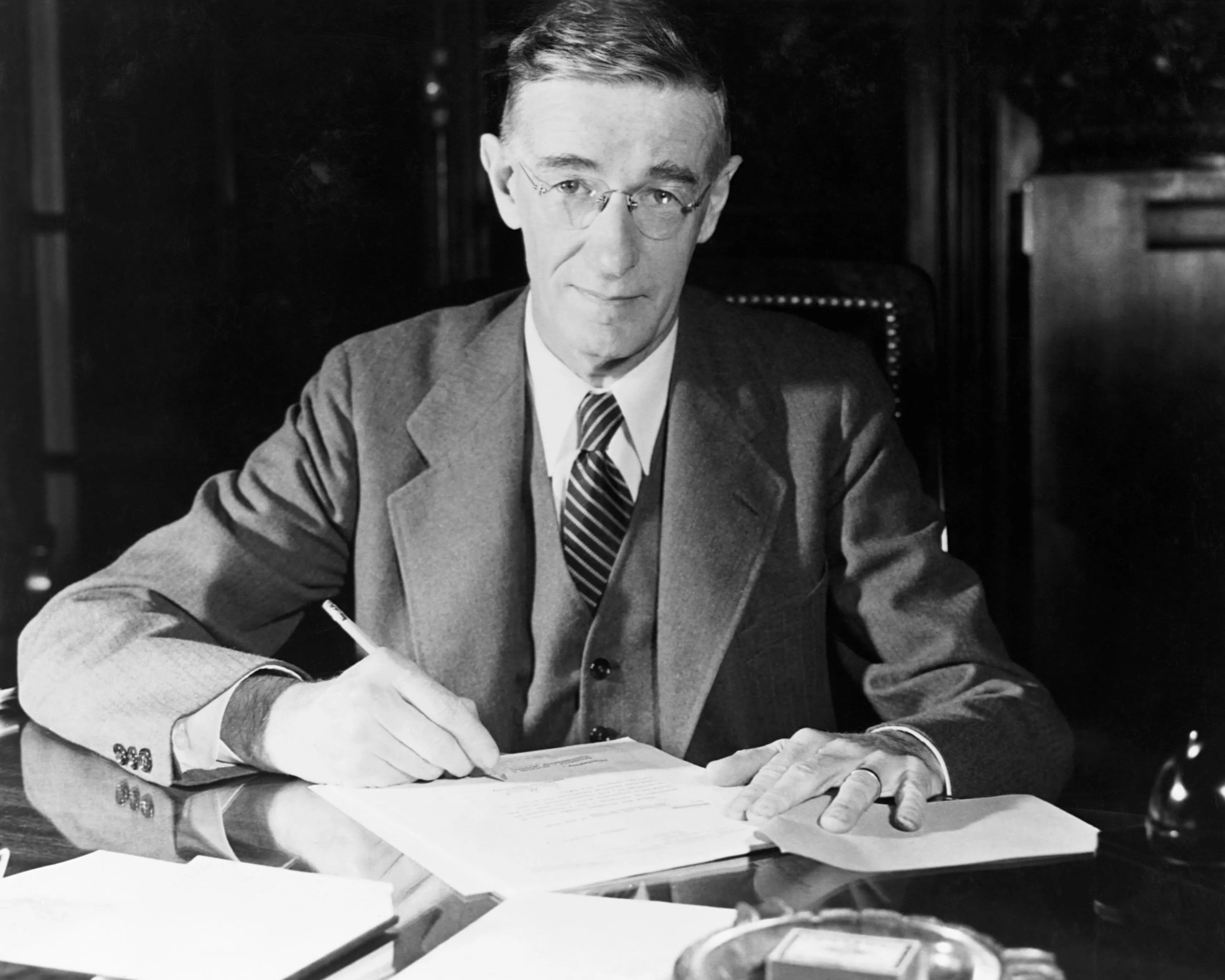
Engineer Vannevar Bush wrote As We May Think in 1945 describing his conception of the Memex, a machine that could implement what we now call hypertext. His aim was to help humanity achieve a collective memory with such a machine and avoid the use of scientific discoveries for destruction and war

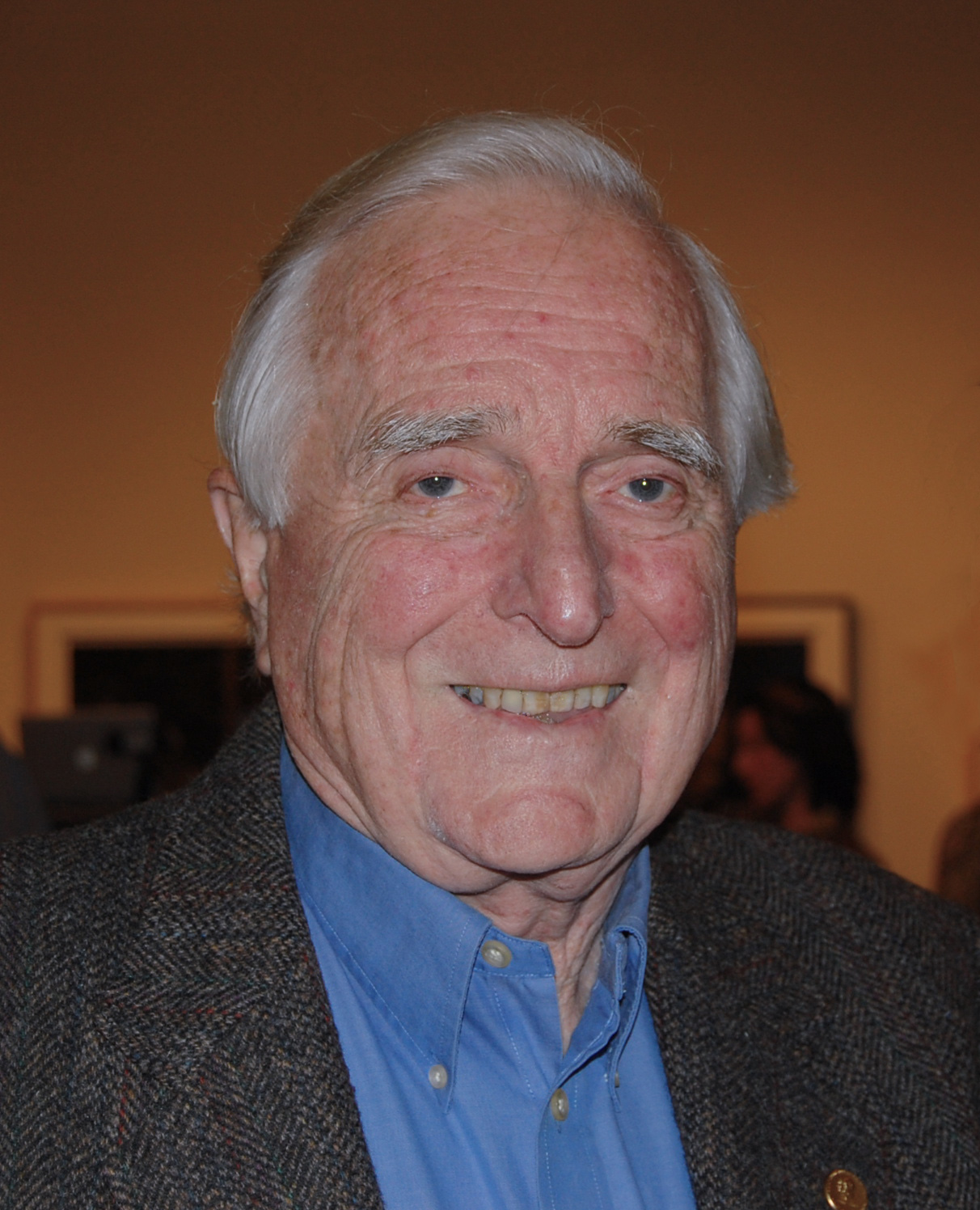
Douglas Engelbart in 2008, at the 40th anniversary celebrations of "The Mother of All Demos" in San Francisco, a 90-minute 1968 presentation of the NLS computer system which was a combination of hardware and software that demonstrated many hypertext ideas

Hypertext is text displayed on a computer or other electronic device with references (hyperlinks) to other text that the reader can immediately access, usually by a mouse click or keypress sequence. Early conceptions of hypertext defined it as text that could be connected by a linking system to a range of other documents that were stored outside that text. In 1934 Belgian bibliographer Paul Otlet developed a blueprint for links that telescoped out from hypertext electrically to allow readers to access documents, books, photographs, and so on, stored anywhere in the world.

== History ==
Recorders of information have long looked for ways to categorize and compile it. There are various methods of arranging layers of references/annotations within a document. Print reference works, such as dictionaries and encyclopedias, have used various typographical elements such as bold text, small caps, and symbols such as the manicule or arrow to indicate terms that can be cross-referenced, or looked up under another entry in the text. For example, instead of a hyperlink to another article, they might have the term formatted as ☞ hyperlink or → hyperlink. The cross-references and marginal notes in printed text served a linking function similar to what is seen in hypertext, and links in digital encyclopedias replaced textual cross-references.

=== Ancient proto-hypertextual literature ===
Venkatraman Balasubramanian, David Porush, and others argue that the concept of hypertext can be traced back as far as to the ancient texts of Ramayana, Mahabharata, and the Talmud:

"The Talmud, with its heavy use of annotations and nested commentary, and Indian epics such as Ramayana and Mahabharata (stories branching off to other stories) are ancient prototypes of hypertext representation."

"The Talmud makes a very good analog of the Internet. The little notations on the sides are hot buttons. The different commentaries are very like frames, a common HTML implementation in which different sections of text can be read as accompaniments to each other, but can be, indeed must be, read at different times and speeds in separate spaces on the electronic page. But beyond their physical similarities, both hypertext and the Talmud imply a way of knowing that is very different from the linear book."

=== Modern proto-hypertextual literature ===
==== Jorge Luis Borges - The Garden of Forking Paths ====
Janet Murray has referenced Jorge Luis Borges' "The Garden of Forking Paths" as a precursor to the hypertext novel and aesthetic:

"The concept Borges described in 'The Garden of Forking Paths'—in several layers of the story, but most directly in the combination book and maze of Ts'ui Pen—is that of a novel that can be read in multiple ways, a hypertext novel. Borges described this in 1941, prior to the invention (or at least the public disclosure) of the electromagnetic digital computer. Borges also mentions how hypertext has similarities to a labyrinth in which each link brings the navigator to a set of new links, in an ever expanding maze. Not only did he invent the hypertext novel—Borges went on to describe a theory of the universe based upon the structure of such a novel." —Wardrip-Fruin and Montfort

==== James Joyce - Finnegans Wake ====
In "The Role of the Reader", Umberto Eco drew the following semiotic schema, "tracing possible nodes of association linking the words 'Neanderthal,' 'Meander,' and 'Tale' from which Joyce formed the transformative word 'Meandertale.' The newly coined word 'Meandertale' appears to signify the very name of the process that forms it: a meandering quest for associations between words — a quest in which these associations simultaneously tell the story of the words' evolution and transform them. In such a well-ventilated world, perhaps one necessary constraint might be to assume that no word suffers more than six degrees of separation from any other:"

Semiotic schema of the words "Neanderthal," "Meander," and "Tale", from which James Joyce formed the transformative word "Meandertale" in Finnegans Wake. Following the lines (edges) between the words (nodes) in the schema (graph) is like following hyperlinks and it can therefore be considered a form of hypertext.

Eco's description of the process of decoding the puns in Finnegans Wake evokes the notion of hypertext buried in James Joyce's writing:

"The field that we have outlined utilizes only a restricted quantity of the lexemes existing in Finnegans Wake. While it would be interesting to trace the entire system of interconnections, such a task would require one to reduce the work, a layer at a time, to each of its possible readings. Every lexeme in every reading might then become the patriarch of a new chain of associations, sending back to other fields, so that by connecting the fields together, one could trace an unending ribbon of associations. Every word of the book becomes the main issue that introduces every other word, a sort of topological maze in which everything is both the deep 'inside' and the peripheral 'outside.'"

=== Information system thinking ===
Later, several scholars entered the scene who believed that humanity was drowning in information, causing foolish decisions and duplicating efforts among scientists. These scholars proposed or developed proto-hypertext systems predating electronic computer technology. For example, in the early 20th century, two visionaries attacked the cross-referencing problem through proposals based on labor-intensive, brute force methods. Paul Otlet proposed a proto-hypertext concept based on his monographic principle, in which all documents would be decomposed down to unique phrases stored on index cards. In the 1930s, H.G. Wells proposed the creation of a World Brain.

Michael Buckland summarized the very advanced pre-World War II development of microfilm based on rapid retrieval devices, specifically the microfilm based workstation proposed by Leonard Townsend in 1938 and the microfilm and photoelectronic based selector, patented by Emanuel Goldberg in 1931. Buckland concluded: "The pre-war information retrieval specialists of continental Europe, the 'documentalists,' largely disregarded by post-war information retrieval specialists, had ideas that were considerably more advanced than is now generally realized." But, like the manual index card model, these microfilm devices provided rapid retrieval based on pre-coded indices and classification schemes published as part of the microfilm record without including the link model which distinguishes the modern concept of hypertext from content or category based information retrieval.

=== The Memex ===
In 1945, Presidential Scientist Advisor Vannevar Bush wrote an article in The Atlantic Monthly called As We May Think, about a futuristic device he called a Memex. He described the device as an electromechanical desk linked to an extensive archive of microfilms, able to display books, writings, or any document from a library. The Memex would also be able to create 'trails' of linked and branching sets of pages, combining pages from the published microfilm library with personal annotations or additions captured on a microfilm recorder. Bush's vision was based on extensions of 1945 technology—microfilm recording and retrieval in this case. However, the modern story of hypertext starts with the Memex because As We May Think directly influenced and inspired the two American men generally credited with the invention of hypertext, Ted Nelson and Douglas Engelbart.

=== The invention of hypertext ===
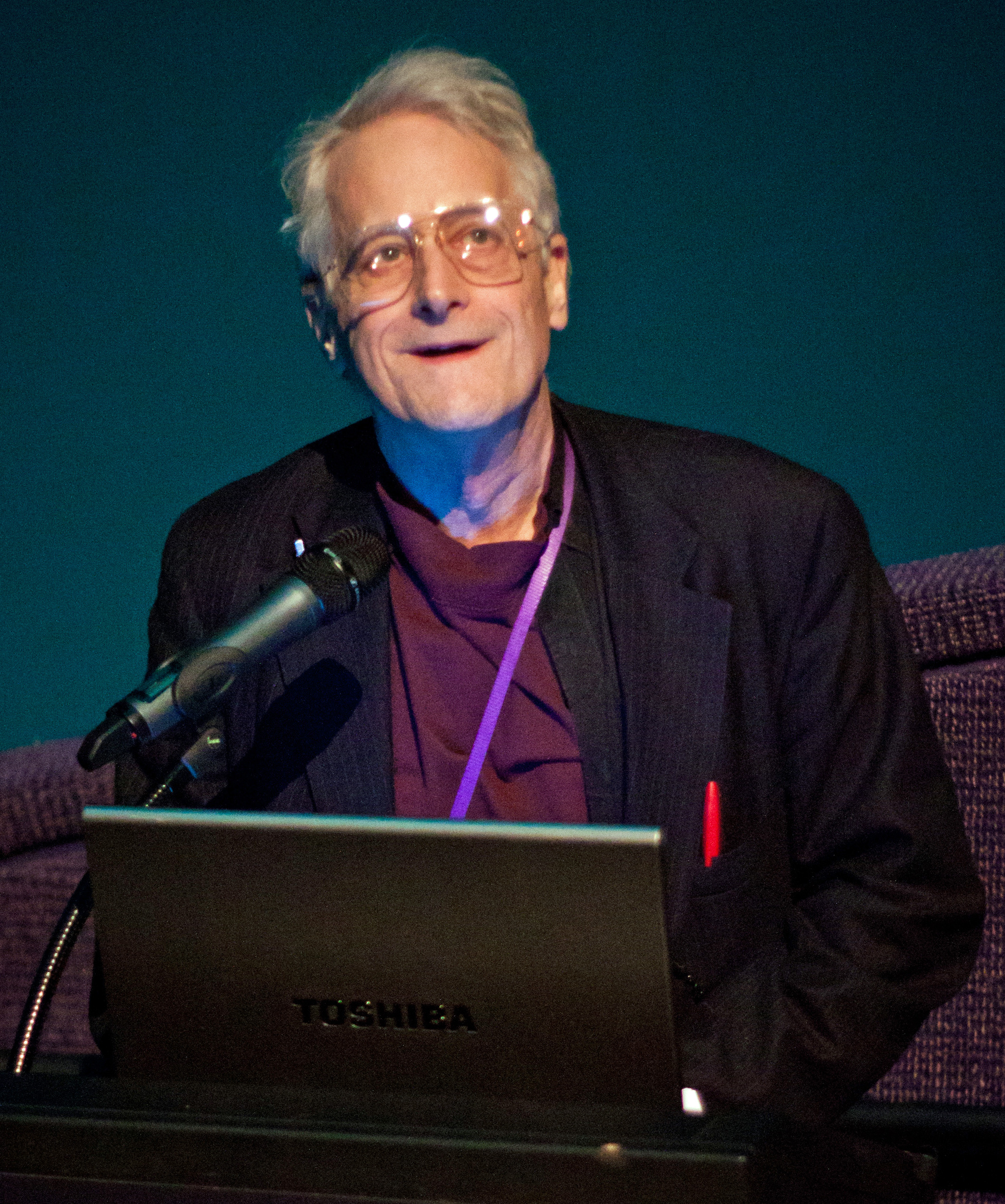
Ted Nelson gives a presentation on Project Xanadu, a theoretical hypertext model conceived in the 1960s, whose first and incomplete implementation was first published in 1998

Starting in 1963, Ted Nelson developed a model for creating and using linked content he called "hypertext" and "hypermedia" (first published reference 1965). Ted Nelson said in the 1960s that he began implementation of Project Xanadu, a hypertext system, but his first incomplete public release was finished much later, in 1998. In 1967, Nelson worked with Andries van Dam to develop the Hypertext Editing System (HES) at Brown University. HES was the first hypertext system available on commercial equipment that novices could use, and it didn't have arbitrary limits on text lengths.

Douglas Engelbart independently began working on his NLS system in 1962 at Stanford Research Institute, although delays in obtaining funding, personnel, and equipment meant that its key features were not completed until 1968. In December of 1968, Engelbart demonstrated a hypertext interface to the public for the first time, in what has come to be known as "The Mother of All Demos". Funding for NLS slowed after 1974.

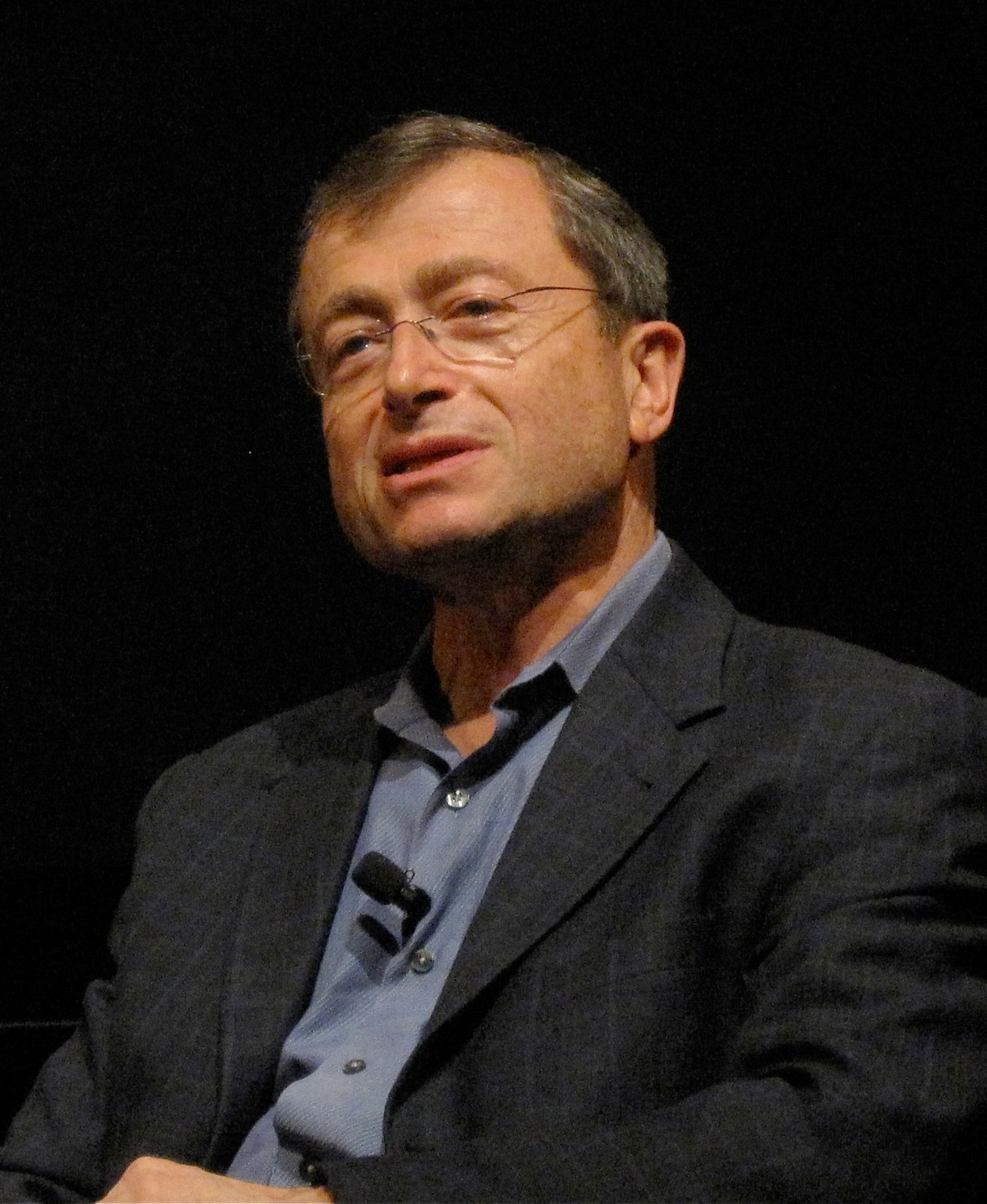
Andries van Dam

Later in 1968, van Dam's team incorporated ideas from NLS into a successor to HES. the File Retrieval and Editing System (FRESS). This was the first hypertext system to run on readily-available commercial hardware. Its user interface was simpler than NLS; where NLS was designed for a cadre of expert students, FRESS was intended for a university audience. By 1976 FRESS received NEH funding and was used in a poetry class in which students could browse and annotate a hyperlinked set of poems and discussion by experts, faculty and other students, in what was arguably the first online scholarly community, which van Dam says "foreshadowed wikis, blogs and communal documents of all kinds".

Influential work in the following decade included NoteCards at Xerox PARC and ZOG at Carnegie Mellon. ZOG started in 1972 as an artificial intelligence research project under the supervision of Allen Newell, and pioneered the "frame" or "card" model of hypertext. ZOG was deployed in 1982 on the U.S.S. Carl Vinson and later commercialized as Knowledge Management System. Other influential hypertext projects from the early 1980s were Ben Shneiderman's The Interactive Encyclopedia System (TIES) at the University of Maryland (1983) and Intermedia at Brown University (1984).

=== Early commercial applications ===
Guide was the first significant hypertext system for personal computers.

In August 1987, Apple Computer released HyperCard for the Macintosh line at the MacWorld convention. Its impact, combined with interest in Peter J. Brown's GUIDE (marketed by OWL and released earlier that year) and Brown University's Intermedia, led to broad interest in and enthusiasm for hypertext and new media. The first ACM Hypertext academic conference took place in November 1987, in Chapel Hill NC, where many other applications, including the hypertext literature writing software Storyspace were also demoed

Meanwhile, Nelson, who had been working on and advocating for his Xanadu system for over two decades, stirred Autodesk to invest in his revolutionary ideas. The project continued at Autodesk for four years, though no product was released.

van Dam's research groups at Brown University continued as well. For example, in the late '70s Steve Feiner and others developed an ebook system for Navy repair manuals, and in the early '80s Norm Meyrowitz and a large team at Brown's Institute for Research in Information and Scholarship built Intermedia (mentioned above), which was heavily used in humanities and literary computing. In '89, Lou Reynolds and former van Dam students Steven DeRose and Jeff Vogel spun off Electronic Book Technologies, whose SGML-based hypertext system DynaText was widely used for large online publishing and e-book projects. Brown's Center For Digital Scholarship (née Scholarly Technology Group) was heavily involved in related standards efforts such as the Text Encoding Initiative, Open eBook and XML, as well as enabling a wide variety of humanities hypertext projects.

=== Hypertext and the World Wide Web ===
In the late 1980s, Berners-Lee, then a scientist at CERN, invented the World Wide Web to meet the demand for simple and immediate information-sharing among physicists working at CERN and different universities or institutes all over the world.

"HyperText is a way to link and access information of various kinds as a web of nodes in which the user can browse at will. It provides a single user-interface to large classes of information (reports, notes, data-bases, computer documentation and on-line help). We propose a simple scheme incorporating servers already available at CERN... A program which provides access to the hypertext world we call a browser... " Tim Berners-Lee, R. Cailliau. 12 November 1990, CERN

In 1992, Lynx was born as an early Internet web browser. Its ability to provide hypertext links within documents that could reach into documents anywhere on the Internet began the creation of the Web on the Internet.

Early in 1993, the National Center for Supercomputing Applications (NCSA) at the University of Illinois released the first version of their Mosaic web browser to supplement the two existing web browsers: one that ran only on NeXTSTEP and one that was only minimally user-friendly. Because it could display and link graphics as well as text, Mosaic quickly became the replacement for Lynx. Mosaic ran in the X Window System environment, which was then popular in the research community, and offered usable window-based interactions. It allowed images as well as text to anchor hypertext links. It also incorporated other protocols intended to coordinate information across the Internet, such as Gopher.

After the release of web browsers for both the PC and Macintosh environments, traffic on the World Wide Web quickly exploded from 500 known web servers in 1993 to over 10,000 in 1994. Thus, earlier hypertext systems were overshadowed by the success of the Web, even though it lacked many features of those earlier systems, such as an easy way to edit what you were reading, typed links, backlinks, transclusion, and source tracking.

In 1995, Ward Cunningham made the first wiki, adding easy editing, backlinks and source tracking to WWW transport.

== See also ==
- Timeline of hypertext technology
- History of the Internet
- History of the World Wide Web
- HTML – Markup language for documents
- Association of Computing Machinery – International Society for Computing
- Electronic literature – Literary works created for digital devices
