= Timeline of hypertext technology =

This article presents a timeline of hypertext technology, including "hypermedia" and related human–computer interaction projects and developments from ancient times and up to the present day. The term hypertext is credited to the author and philosopher Ted Nelson.

See also Graphical user interface, Multimedia; also Paul Otlet and Henri La Fontaine's Mundaneum, a massively cross-referenced card index system established in 1910.

== 700 BCE–600 CE ==
- 700 BCE–300 CE
  - Ramayana
- 300 BCE–400 CE
  - Mahabharata
- 300–600 CE
  - Talmud

== 1930s ==
- 1939
  - James Joyce's "Finnegans Wake"

== 1940s ==
- 1941
  - Jorge Luis Borges' "The Garden of Forking Paths"
- 1945
  - Memex (concept by Vannevar Bush)

== 1960s ==
- 1960
  - Project Xanadu (concept)
- 1962
  - Marshall McLuhan's The Gutenberg Galaxy uses the term surfing
- 1967
  - Hypertext Editing System (HES) by Andries van Dam and Ted Nelson at Brown University
- 1968
  - FRESS (File Retrieval and Editing System, successor to HES)
  - NLS (oN-Line System)

== 1970s ==
- 1972
  - ZOG
- 1973
  - Xerox Alto desktop
- 1976
  - PROMIS
- 1978
  - Aspen Movie Map
- 1979
  - PERQ

== 1980s ==
- 1980
  - ENQUIRE (not released)
- 1981
  - Electronic Document System (EDS, aka Document Presentation System)
  - Kussmaul Encyclopedia
  - Xerox Star desktop
- 1982
  - Guide
- 1983
  - Knowledge Management System (KMS, successor to ZOG)
  - TIES (The Interactive Encyclopedia System, later HyperTies)
- 1984
  - NoteCards
- 1985
  - Intermedia (successor to FRESS and EDS)
  - Symbolics Document Examiner (Symbolics workstations)
  - Grolier Academic American Encyclopedia CD-ROM Edition
- 1986
  - Texinfo
  - TextNet (a network-based approach to text handling)
  - Neptune (a hypertext system for CAD applications)
- 1987
  - Macromedia Authorware
  - Canon Cat ("Leap" function, interface)
  - HyperCard
  - Knowledge Navigator (concept described by former Apple Computer CEO John Sculley in his book Odyssey)
  - Storyspace
- 1988
  - Microcosm (hypermedia system) (University of Southampton)
- 1989
  - Macromedia Director
  - Information Management: a proposal, Tim Berners-Lee, CERN

== 1990s ==
- 1990
  - DynaText
  - World Wide Web
  - Hyperland (BBC documentary written by Douglas Adams)
  - ToolBook
  - HyTelnet
  - WinHelp
- 1991
  - Gopher
  - AmigaGuide
- 1995
  - Wiki
- 1996
  - Hyperwire (Kinetix)
- 1998
  - Everything2
  - XML
- 1999
  - RSS

== 2000s ==
- 2001
  - Wikipedia
- 2005
  - Atom (web standard)
- 2014
  - OpenXanadu, an implementation of Project Xanadu
- 2019
  - Gemini, a lightweight complement to the Web
