= Problem-Oriented Medical Information System =

Hospital patient records system

The Problem-Oriented Medical Information System, or PROMIS, was a hypertext system specially designed for maintaining health care records. PROMIS was developed at the University of Vermont in 1976, primarily by Jan Schultz and Dr. Lawrence Weed, M.D.

Apparently, the developers of Carnegie Mellon University's ZOG system were so impressed with PROMIS that it reinspired them to return to their own work.

PROMIS was an interactive, touchscreen system that allowed users to access a medical record within a large body of medical knowledge. At its peak, the PROMIS system had over 60,000 frames of knowledge.

PROMIS was also known for its fast responsiveness, especially for its time.
