= Three Rivers Computer Corporation =

Spinoff from the RELCSEDCMU

- Company type: Private
- Industry: Computer hardware and software
- Founded: Pennsylvania (1974)
- Fate: Insolvency (1985)
- Headquarters: Pittsburgh, Pennsylvania, USA
- Key people: Brian Rosen; Ed Fredkin, CEO; Raj Reddy
- Products: PERQ
- Number of employees: 150 (1985)

The Three Rivers Computer Corporation (3RCC) was a spinoff from the Research Engineering Laboratory of the Computer Science Department of Carnegie Mellon University, and was founded in May 1974 by Brian S. Rosen, James R. Teter, William H. Broadley, J. Stanley Kriz, D. Raj Reddy and Paul G. Newbury in Pittsburgh, Pennsylvania, United States to manufacture advanced technology computer displays, peripherals, and systems.

Early products included: the GDP/2A Graphics Display processor with high speed vector generator capable of drawing in excess of 50,000 vectors at 60 Hz refresh rates; a CVD/2 Color Video Display System that displayed a full color raster scanned image with a unique data compression algorithm capable of full frame animation display; ADA-16 Analog to Digital and Digital to Analog converters for high fidelity music and speech research, and a UMB-11 Unibus Monitor that was a low-cost test instrument for PDP-11 series minicomputers. In 1979, the company launched its principal products, a line of workstation computers called PERQ, which were single-user high performance workstations with the power of a medium-scale mainframe computer from that era coupled with a versatile graphics display. In the summer of 1980, the company divested itself of all activities other than those related to PERQ.

From 1981 onwards, 3RCC developed and produced the PERQ jointly with ICL in the United Kingdom. 3RCC changed its name to PERQ Systems Corporation in 1984, but became insolvent in 1985.
