= As We May Think =

1945 essay by Vannevar Bush

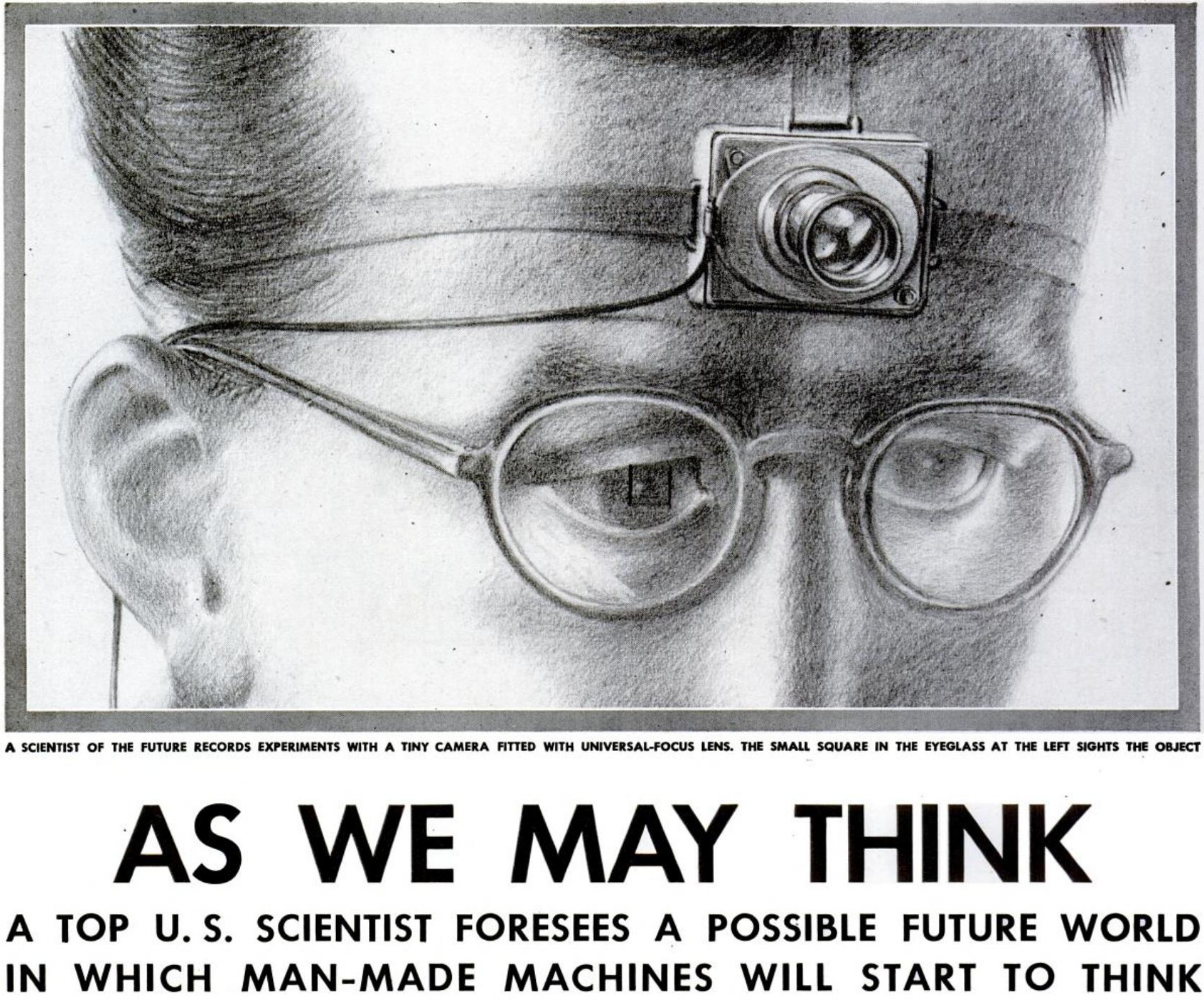
- Author: Vannevar Bush
- Language: English
- Genre: Science and technology
- Published in: The Atlantic
- Publication date: July 1945
- Media type: Print

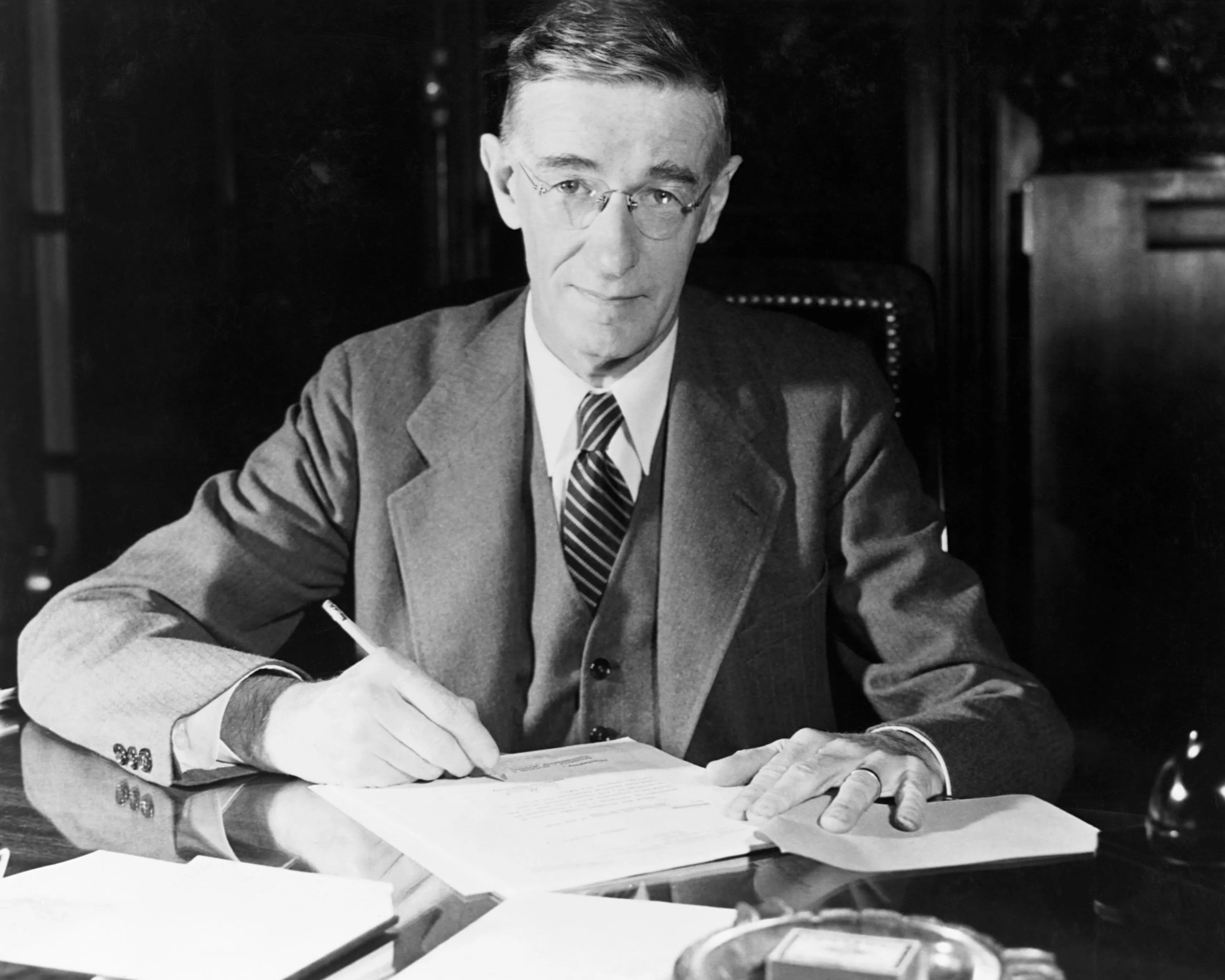
Vannevar Bush

"As We May Think" is a 1945 essay by Vannevar Bush which has been described as visionary and influential, anticipating many aspects of information society. It was first published in The Atlantic Monthly in July 1945 and republished in an abridged version in September 1945—before and after the atomic bombings of Hiroshima and Nagasaki. Bush expresses his concern for the direction of scientific efforts toward destruction, rather than understanding, and explicates a desire for a sort of collective memory machine with his concept of the memex that would make knowledge more accessible, believing that it would help fix these problems. Through this machine, Bush hoped to transform an information explosion into a knowledge explosion.

== Concept creation ==
The article was a reworked and expanded version of Bush's essay "Mechanization and the Record" (1939). Here, he described a machine that would combine lower level technologies to achieve a higher level of organized knowledge (like human memory processes). Shortly after the publication of this essay, Bush coined the term "memex" in a letter written to the editor of Fortune magazine. That letter became the body of "As We May Think", which added only an introduction and conclusion. As described, Bush's memex was based on what was thought, at the time, to be advanced technology of the future: ultra high resolution microfilm reels, coupled to multiple screen viewers and cameras, by electromechanical controls. The memex, in essence, reflects a library of collective knowledge stored in a piece of machinery described in his essay as "a piece of furniture". The Atlantic publication of Bush's article was followed by an abridged version in the September 10, 1945, issue of Life magazine, accompanied by fanciful illustrations of the proposed memex desk and other devices Bush projected. Bush also discussed other technologies such as dry photography and microphotography where he elaborates on the potentialities of their future use. For example, Bush states in his essay that:

The combination of optical projection and photographic reduction is already producing some results in microfilm for scholarly purposes, and the potentialities are highly suggestive.

— Vannevar Bush

== Concept realization ==
"As We May Think" predicted (to some extent) many kinds of technology invented after its publication, including hypertext, personal computers, the Internet, the World Wide Web, speech recognition, and online encyclopedias such as Wikipedia: "Wholly new forms of encyclopedias will appear, ready-made with a mesh of associative trails running through them, ready to be dropped into the memex and there amplified." Bush envisioned the ability to retrieve several articles or pictures on one screen, with the possibility of writing comments that could be stored and recalled together. He believed people would create links between related articles, thus mapping the thought process and path of each user and saving it for others to experience.

Bush's article also laid the foundation for new media. Doug Engelbart came across the essay shortly after its publication, and keeping the memex in mind, he began work that would eventually result in the invention of the mouse, the word processor, the hyperlink and concepts of new media for which these groundbreaking inventions were merely enabling technologies.

Since then, storage has greatly surpassed the level imagined by Vannevar Bush,

The Encyclopædia Britannica could be reduced to the volume of a matchbox. A library of a million volumes could be compressed into one end of a desk.

— Vannevar Bush

On the other hand, it still uses methods of indexing of information which Bush described as artificial:

When data of any sort are placed in storage, they are filed alphabetically or numerically, and information is found (when it is) by tracing it down from subclass to subclass. It can be in only one place, unless duplicates are used.

— Vannevar Bush

This description resembles popular file systems of modern computer operating systems (FAT, NTFS, ext3 when used without hard links and symlinks, etc.), which do not easily enable associative indexing as imagined by Bush.

== Outlook in the use of science ==
Bush urges that scientists should turn to the massive task of creating more efficient accessibility to our fluctuating store of knowledge. For years inventions have extended people's physical powers rather than the powers of their mind. He argues that the instruments are at hand which, if properly developed, will give society access to and command over the inherited knowledge of the ages. The perfection of these pacific instruments, he suggests, should be the first objective of our scientists.

Through this process, society would be able to focus and evolve past the existing knowledge rather than looping through infinite calculations. We should be able to pass the tedious work of numbers to machines and work on the intricate theory which puts them best to use. If humanity were able to obtain the "privilege of forgetting the manifold things he does not need to have immediately at hand, with some assurance that he can find them again if proven important" only then "will mathematics be practically effective in bringing the growing knowledge of atomistic to the useful solution of the advanced problems of chemistry, metallurgy, and biology". To exemplify the importance of this concept, consider the process involved in 'simple' shopping: "Every time a charge sale is made, there are a number of things to be done. The inventory needs to be revised, the salesman needs to be given credit for the sale, the general accounts need an entry, and most important, the customer needs to be charged." Due to the convenience of the store's central device, which rapidly manages thousands of these transactions, the employees may focus on the essential aspects of the department such as sales and advertising.

Indeed, "science has provided the swiftest communication between individuals; it has provided a record of ideas and has enabled man to manipulate and to make extracts from that record so that knowledge evolves and endures throughout the life of a race rather than of an individual". Improved technology has become an extension of our capabilities, much as how external hard drives function for computers so they may reserve memory for more practical tasks.

Another significant role of practicality in technology is the method of association and selection. "There may be millions of fine thoughts, and the account of the experience on which they are based, all encased within stone walls of acceptable architectural form; but if the scholar can get at only one a week by diligent search, his synthesis are not likely to keep up with the current scene." Bush believes that the tools available in his time lacked this feature, but noted the emergence and development of ideas such as the Memex, a cross referencing system.

Bush concludes his essay by stating that:

The applications of science have built man a well-supplied house, and are teaching him to live healthily therein. They have enabled him to throw masses of people against one another with cruel weapons. They may yet allow him truly to encompass the great record and to grow in the wisdom of race experience. He may perish in conflict before he learns to wield that record for his true good. Yet, in the application of science to the needs and desires of man, it would seem to be a singularly unfortunate stage at which to terminate the process, or to lose hope as to the outcome.

— Vannevar Bush

== Outline ==
Editor's note: Technologies like trip hammers exist that can do physical labor better and faster. Soon, technologies will exist that can help people do intellectual labor better and faster.

Introduction: Many scientists, especially physicists, obtained new duties during World War II. Now, after the war, they need new peaceful duties.

Section 1: Scientific knowledge has grown considerably, but the way we manage knowledge has remained the same for centuries. We are no longer able to keep up and find relevant information in the flood of information. Leibniz's computer and Charles Babbage's computer were both failures because technologies of their times could not produce them cheaply and precisely, but now we have enough technology.

Section 2: Science should not only be a vast store of knowledge, but also be frequently consulted and enhanced. Two kinds of technologies can help: analog information on microfilms, and digital information encoded by electric signals. While they are different, both kinds would be vastly cheaper than traditional printed media.

With instant photography and microfilm, it will be cheap to copy and transmit analog information. Microfilm could shrink books and other paper-publications by a linear factor of 100x, or an area factor of 10000x. A library of 1 million books would occupy the volume of 100 books, which can fit on a bookshelf. All the world's books can fit inside a moving van. (Note: "... the human race has produced... a volume corresponding to a billion books... assembled and compressed, could be lugged off in a moving van.") (Note: Google Books estimates there are 130 million books in the world, which means they can be shrunken down to the volume of 13000 books, or about 6 tons.) Production and transmission would cost pennies. (Note: "The material for the microfilm Britannica would cost a nickel, and it could be mailed anywhere for a cent.")

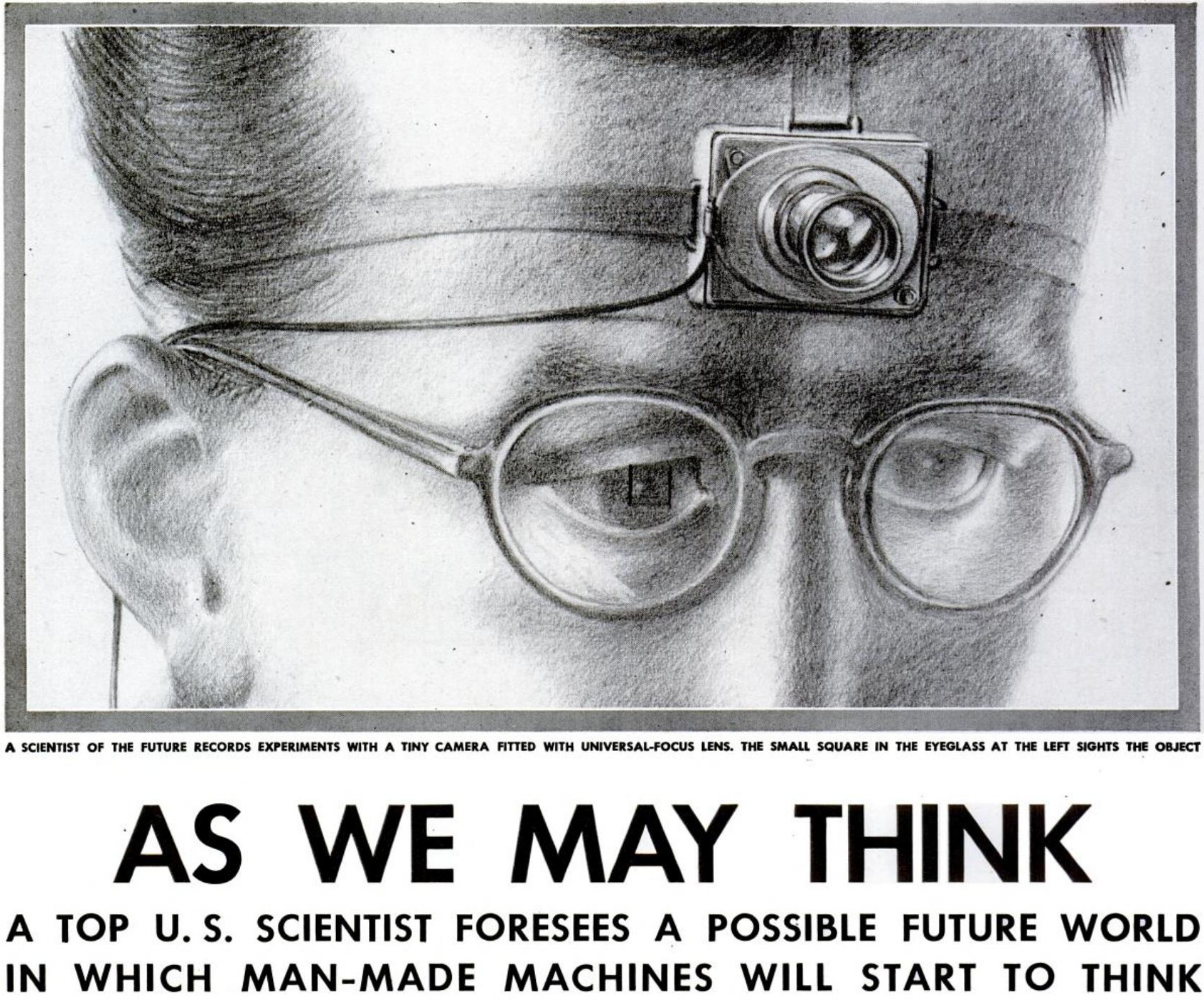
The walnut-sized camera

A possible future device would be a walnut-sized camera strapped to the head of the wearer that can take a photo at the squeeze of a hand, and develop it. The photos can be taken out at the end of a day for further processing. (Illustrated in the header image.)

Bush goes into some technical details about instant photography and electric fax machines. In his days, wet photography was the most common, yet it takes a long time and is hard to shrink into a small camera. However, whiteprint technology (Note: "... films impregnated with diazo dyes... An exposure to ammonia gas destroys the unexposed dye, and the picture can then be taken out into the light and examined.") might be miniaturized, leading to miniature dry photography. (Note: While instant film eventually popularized dry photography, its technology is quite different from whiteprint. It uses a silver halide process where exposure to light releases colorless dye developers that, upon diffusion to a positive sheet in an acidic environment, become colored to form a full-color image.)

Printed material could be transmitted cheaply by digital signals, as demonstrated by electric fax machines. The sending side uses photocells to convert images to electric signals, and on the receiving side, electric printers convert the electric signal into electric sparks hitting iodine-impregnated paper, turning it black. (Note: Likely the fultograph.)

Section 3: Not only will it be cheap to transmit and copy digital material, it will also be cheap to convert printed material into digital form. Language is interconvertible with digital signals, as shown by three technologies:

- The Voder can turn digital signals to speech.
- The Vocoder can turn speech to digital signals.
- The stenotype can turn speech or text to digital signals.

While currently Vocoders need human operators, a future Vocoder could transcribe speech automatically. A future researcher could walk around, take photos with the head-mounted camera, and record sound and speech. The photos and the sounds would have timing information. At the end of the day, this timed record of the day can be processed and reviewed.

To study cosmic rays, physicists built vacuum tubes (Note: Bush calls them "thermionic-tube", an older name for them.) that could count at 0.1 MHz. Future electronic computers could operate at least 100 times faster, at 10 MHz. Herman Hollerith's tabulating machine showed that simple machines programmed by punched cards could be commercially valuable. Future computers could perform complex programs according to punched cards or microfilms.

Section 4: Most of the existing computing machines are tabulating machines, arithmetic machines. Some are more advanced, like tide-predicting machines, and machines for solving differential and integration equations. Future scientists will delegate even more advanced routine mathematics to machines, just as one would delegate the operation of a car to its engine. By delegating away more routines, scientists can perform creative, intuitive work. (Note: Bush did not imagine a general computer. Instead, he imagined many specific computers: "... there still come more machines to handle advanced mathematics for the scientist. Some of them will be sufficiently bizarre to suit the most fastidious connoisseur of the present artifacts of civilization.")

Section 5: Scientists and other knowledge workers manipulate data and perform logical inferences. Any routine logical process that a worker performs repeatedly could be programmed into a machine. Normal or even mathematical language is too vague for programming. A "positional" (Note: By "positional" he meant "resembling punched cards". Earlier in the essay, Bush said: "If we recorded them positionally, simply by the configuration of a set of dots on a card, the automatic reading mechanism would become comparatively simple.") logical language would be needed for entering information the machines.

Not only will they be for entering information, machines will also help people find information. For example, punched card sorters and telephone exchanges are both search machines: the sorter can quickly produce a stack of cards listing, for example, all employees who live in Trenton, New Jersey and know the Spanish language, and a telephone exchange can quickly connect to the line specified by a number sequence.

Bush proceeds to describe in detail a management system for a department store, where a salesperson enters customer and product information, which a central machine uses to update inventory, credit sales, adjust accounts, and charge customers, using analog devices such as punched cards, dry photography, microfilms, Valdemar Poulsen's magnetic wire recorder, and so on.

Section 6: Traditional information systems, such as the library classification system, are tree-like. At the top are the biggest classes, and each class can have subclasses, and so on. Each item belongs uniquely to a leaf on the tree of information. This is cumbersome, and the human mind does not operate that way, but operates by association. In human thinking, one traces out a "trail" of information.

This process can be augmented by the memex. Like human memory, it retrieves information by association, not by going down a tree of classification. The memex is a machine for individual use, where they could store all their books, records, and communications.

The memex looks like a desk. It contains a storage unit for microfilms, sufficient for an individual's lifetime. (Note: "if the user inserted 5000 pages of material a day it would take him hundreds of years to fill the repository, so he can be profligate and enter material freely." Previously, Bush assumed an area shrinking factor of 10000x, so 5000 pages/day * 100 years / 10000 = 18300 pages. It would correspond to 60 books, each having 300 pages, which can fit on one bookshelf.) Microfilms can be bought like books and magazines. Letters, documents, and hand-drawn manuscripts can be placed on a transparent plate that is then photographed and converted to microfilm. One can also manually type onto them with a keyboard.

Typing on the keyboard, the user can find any microfilm by associative search. Pushing on levers allows users to flip through a microfilmed book, moving forward or backward at variable speeds. The user can open up several microfilms at once, then draw lines and commentaries between them using dry photography or by a telautograph-like pen.

Section 7: The essence of memex is associative indexing: the user can make any item associate with any other, so that pulling up the first item automatically pulls up the second. Associations can be chained, building a "trail". A trail can be named and later retrieved by typing on the keyboard. Any item can be a part of many trails. Associative indexing can be implemented by coded dots printed on the bottoms of microfilms, and an optical reader can read the printed code and electrically signal the memex to pull up the next item. (Note: "At the bottom of each there are a number of blank code spaces... on each item these dots by their positions designate the index number of the other item." The associations, as described here, are bi-directional, but the same technology can implement uni-directional association.)

Bush describes a use scenario, where the user is studying why the short Turkish bow was apparently superior to the English longbow in the Crusades. He searches through encyclopedias and textbooks, building a trail of connections. He also branches off another trail through textbooks and handbooks on elasticity. Later, in conversation with a friend about how people resist innovation, he brings up the trail again, and then copies the whole trail out to be installed into his friend's memex. There, the trail is joined into a more general trail about how people resist innovation.

Section 8: Bush envisions a future where memex machines are everywhere. There will be microfilmed encyclopedias with trails already installed. Lawyers, patent attorneys, and other knowledge workers will use the memex to store their associative trails accumulated over their professional life. There will be a new kind of job: "trail blazers", who find new and useful trails.

Bush expect future technology to be superior than those described in the essay, but he keeps to only known technologies, instead of the possible unknown, (Note: The first transistor was built in 1947, two years after the essay.) to keep the idea of memex practical. More speculatively, since the human nervous system is electrical, future human-machine interfaces could be purely electrical.

== Reception ==
"As We May Think" is considered to be a visionary and influential essay. In their introduction to a paper discussing information literacy as a discipline, Johnston and Webber write

Bush's paper might be regarded as describing a microcosm of the information society, with the boundaries tightly drawn by the interests and experiences of a major scientist of the time, rather than the more open knowledge spaces of the 21st century. Bush provides a core vision of the importance of information to industrial/scientific society, using the image of an "information explosion" arising from the unprecedented demands on scientific production and technological application of World War II. He outlines a version of information science as a key discipline within the practice of scientific and technical knowledge domains. His view encompasses the problems of information overload and the need to devise efficient mechanisms to control and channel information for use.

— Johnston and Webber

Indeed, Bush was very concerned with information overload inhibiting the research efforts of scientists. His scientist, operating under conditions of "information explosion" and requiring respite from the tide of scientific documents could be construed as a nascent image of the "Information Literate Person" in an information saturated society.

There is a growing mountain of research. But there is increased evidence that we are being bogged down today as specialization extends. The investigator is staggered by the findings and conclusions of thousands of other workers.

— Vannevar Bush

Schools, colleges, health care, government, etc., are all implicated in the distribution and use of information, under similar conditions of "information explosion" as Bush's post-war scientists. All these people arguably need some sort of personal "information control" in order to function.

— Bill Johnston, Sheila Webber

== See also ==
- Man-Computer Symbiosis
- Timeline of hypertext technology
- Douglas Engelbart
