= Guide (hypertext) =

Guide was a hypertext system developed by Peter J. Brown at the University of Kent in 1982. The original Guide implementation was for Three Rivers PERQ workstations running Unix. The Guide system became the third hypertext system to be sold commercially, marketed by Office Workstations Ltd (OWL) in 1984 and later by InfoAccess. It won Brown the British Computer Society's award for technical innovation in 1988. He retired in 1999 and died of cancer in 2007, according to a tribute page at the University of Kent website.

Ian Ritchie, founder of OWL, presented a TED talk in 2011 describing his missed opportunity to convert Guide to a graphical browser for the Web at its inception in 1990, titled "The day I turned down Tim Berners-Lee".

In September 1986, Guide was ported by OWL to the Apple Macintosh, and in July 1987 to Microsoft Windows.

In August 1987, Apple began bundling its own Macintosh graphical programming system HyperCard. Owl announced that Guide 2.0, scheduled for September, would allow HyperCard files to work on Windows. According to news reports in 1988, OWL announced plans to release a version of Guide for the IBM PS/2 line of computers under the name "Hyper Document", to compete with HyperCard.

OWL gradually shifted the focus of Guide from a low-cost hypertext word processor to a more expensive CD-ROM multimedia development system.

Unlike most hypertext systems, the main link mechanism in Guide is based on replacement, meaning that when following a link, the current node breaks open, making room for the destination node. The anchor of the link is replaced by the contents of the destination node, like an expanded node in an outliner, but without the restraint of a hierarchical outline. One can close the destination node, which means that it is once again replaced by the text of the anchor. Thus, the basic method of navigation using Guide was the expansion button, by which a section was replaced when selected and expansion provided additional levels of detail. This allowed the user, whether a document author or a reader, to expand and contract a document, viewing the desired level at any time, not unlike viewing methods used in Adobe Acrobat files. This method required a hierarchical document structure.

Guide supported pop-ups for small annotations, and jumps, which behaved like the follow-link operation in most hypertexts (as in van Dam's FRESS system). The jumps allowed for the non-hierarchical link creation.
