= Electronic Document System =

Early graphical hypertext system

The Electronic Document System (EDS) was an early hypertext system – also known as the Interactive Graphical Documents (IGD) hypermedia system – focused on creation of interactive documents such as equipment repair manuals or computer-aided instruction texts with embedded links and graphics. EDS was a 1978–1981 research project at Brown University by Steven Feiner, Sandor Nagy and Andries van Dam.

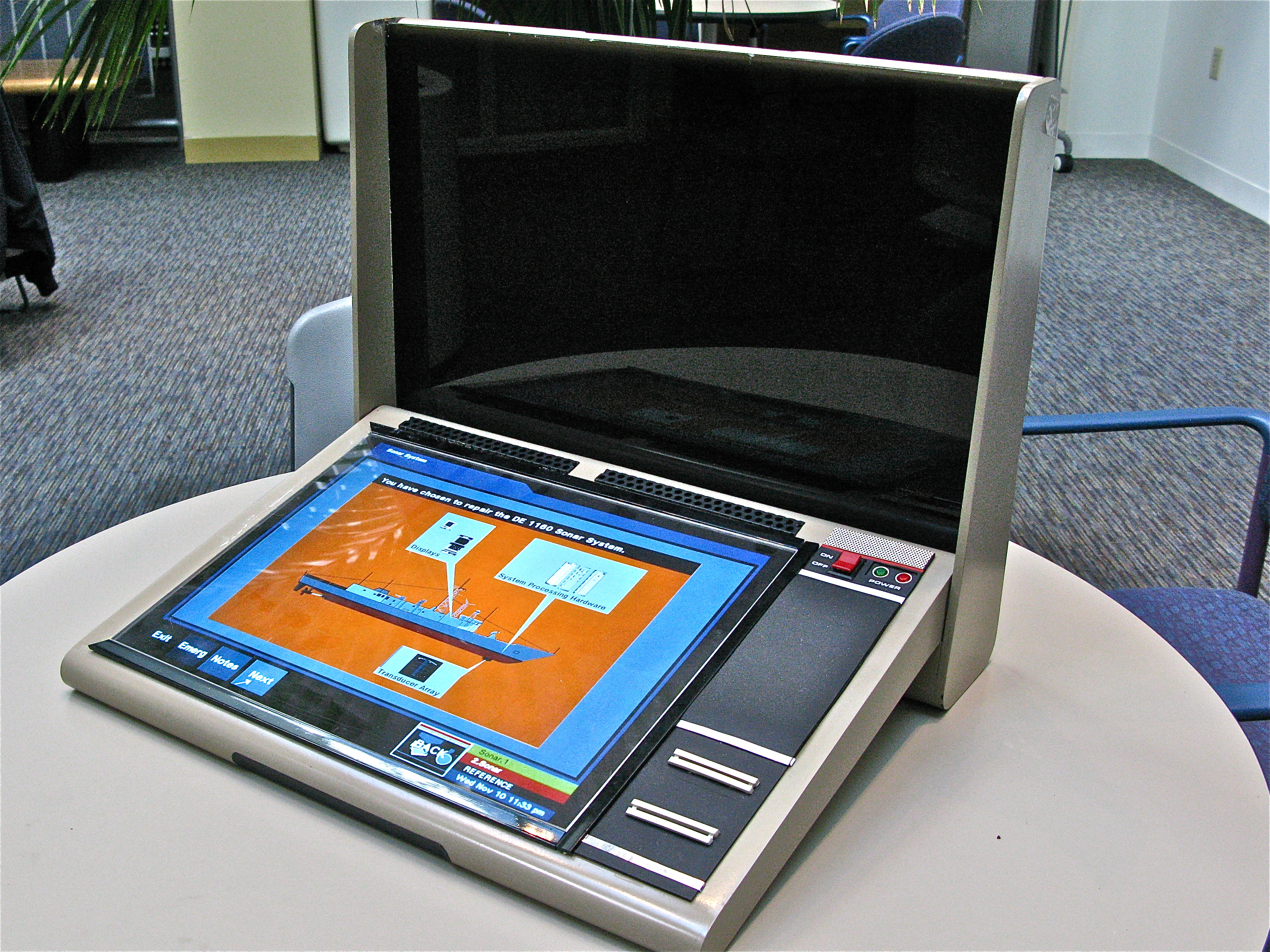
Electronic Document System (EDS) – Electronic Maintenance Manual Concept (circa 1980). Software actually ran on a dedicated VAX 11/780 and Ramtek raster display

EDS used a dedicated Ramtech raster display and VAX-11/780 computer to create and navigate a network of graphic pages containing interactive graphic buttons. Graphic buttons had programmed behaviors such as invoking an animation, linking to another page, or exposing an additional level of detail.

The system had three automatically created navigation aids:

1. a timeline showing thumbnail images of pages traversed;
2. a 'neighbors' display showing thumbnails of all pages linking to the current page on the left, and all pages reachable from the current page on the right;
3. a visual display of thumbnail page images arranged by page keyword, color coded by chapter.

Unlike most hypertext systems, EDS incorporated state variables associated with each page. For example, clicking a button indicating a particular hardware fault might set a state variable that would expose a new set of buttons with links to a relevant choice of diagnostic pages. The EDS model prefigured graphic hypertext systems such as Apple's HyperCard.
