= Memex =

Hypothetical proto-hypertext system

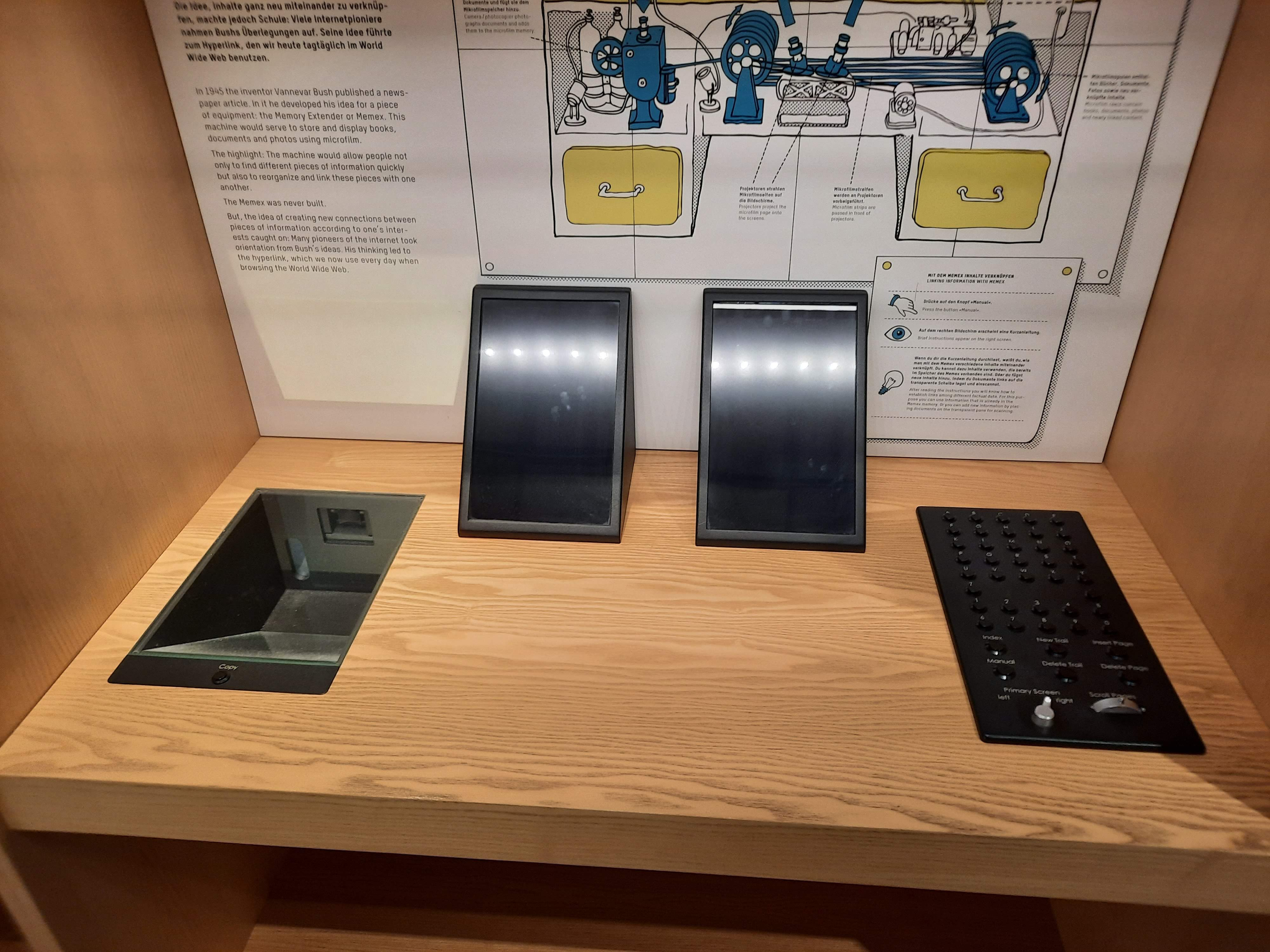
Interpretation of the MEMEX at German Museum of Technology

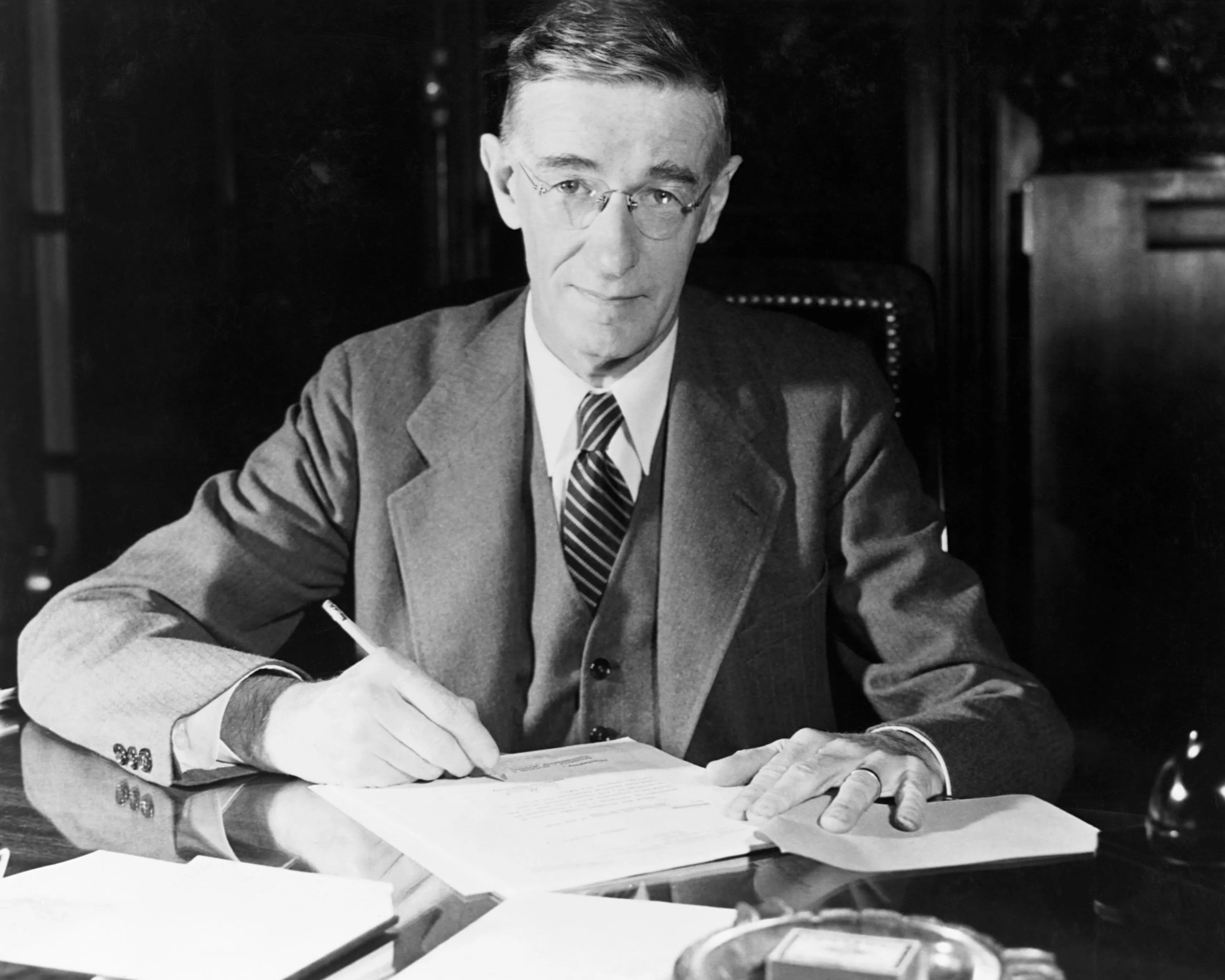
Vannevar Bush

A memex (a portmanteau of "memory" and "index") is a hypothetical electromechanical device for interacting with microform documents and described in Vannevar Bush's 1945 article "As We May Think". Bush envisioned the memex as a device in which individuals would compress and store all of their books, records, and communications, "mechanized so that it may be consulted with exceeding speed and flexibility". The individual was supposed to use the memex as an automatic personal filing system, making the memex "an enlarged intimate supplement to his memory".

The concept of the memex influenced the development of early hypertext systems and personal knowledge base software. The hypothetical implementation depicted by Bush for the purpose of concrete illustration was based upon a document bookmark list of static microfilm pages and lacked a true hypertext system, where parts of pages would have internal structure beyond the common textual format.

== Development ==
=== An electromechanical memex device ===
In "As We May Think", Vannevar Bush describes a memex as an electromechanical device enabling individuals to develop and read a large self-contained research library, create and follow associative trails of links and personal annotations, and recall these trails at any time to share them with other researchers. This device would closely mimic the associative processes of the human mind, but it would be gifted with permanent recollection. As Bush writes, "Thus science may implement the ways in which man produces, stores, and consults the record of the race".

The technology used would have been a combination of electromechanical controls and microfilm cameras and readers, all integrated into a large desk. Most of the microfilm library would have been contained within the desk, but the user could add or remove microfilm reels at will. A memex would hypothetically read and write content on these microfilm reels, using electric photocells to read coded symbols recorded next to individual microfilm frames while the reels spun at high speed, stopping on command. The coded symbols would enable the memex to index, search, and link content to create and follow associative trails.

The top of the desk would have slanting translucent screens on which material could be projected for convenient reading. The top of the memex would have a transparent platen. When a longhand note, photograph, memoranda, or other things were placed on the platen, the depression of a lever would cause the item to be photographed onto the next blank space in a section of the memex film.

According to Bush, the memex could become "a sort of mechanized private file and library". The memex device as described by Bush "would use microfilm storage, dry photography, and analog computing to give postwar scholars access to a huge, indexed repository of knowledge any section of which could be called up with a few keystrokes."

=== Associative trails ===
An associative trail as conceived by Bush would be a way to create a new linear sequence of microfilm frames across any arbitrary sequence of microfilm frames by creating a chained sequence of links in the way just described, along with personal comments and side trails. At the time, Bush saw the current ways of indexing information as limiting and instead proposed a way to store information that was analogous to the mental association of the human brain: storing information with the capability of easy access at a later time using certain cues (in this case, a series of numbers as a code to retrieve data).

=== Other features ===
According to Bush, the memex would have features other than linking. The user could record new information on microfilm, by taking photos from paper or from a touch-sensitive translucent screen. A user could "...insert a comment of his own, either linking it into the main trail or joining it by a side trail to a particular item. ...Thus he builds a trail of his interest through the maze of materials available to him." A user could also create a copy of an interesting trail (containing references and personal annotations) and "...pass it to his friend for insertion in his own memex, there to be linked into the more general trail."

In September 1945, Life magazine published an illustration by Alfred D. Crimi showing the "Memex desk". According to Life magazine, the Memex desk "would instantly bring files and material on a subject to the operator's fingertips". The mechanical core of the desk would also include "a mechanism which automatically photographs longhand notes, pictures and letters, then file them in the desk for future reference."

=== Extending, storing, and consulting the record of the species ===
Bush's 1945 "As We May Think" idea for the memex extended far beyond a mechanism that might augment the research of one individual working in isolation. In Bush's idea, the ability to connect, annotate, and share both published works and personal trails would profoundly change the process by which the "world's record" is created and used:

Wholly new forms of encyclopedias will appear, ready-made with a mesh of associative trails running through them, ready to be dropped into the memex and there amplified. The lawyer has at his touch the associated opinions and decisions of his whole experience, and of the experience of friends and authorities. The patent attorney has on call the millions of issued patents, with familiar trails to every point of his client's interest. The physician, puzzled by a patient's reactions, strikes the trail established in studying an earlier similar case, and runs rapidly through analogous case histories, with side references to the classics for the pertinent anatomy and histology. ...

The historian, with a vast chronological account of a people, parallels it with a skip trail that stops only on the salient items and can follow at any time contemporary trails which lead him all over civilization at a particular epoch. There is a new profession of trailblazers, those who find delight in the task of establishing useful trails through the enormous mass of the common record. The inheritance from the master becomes, not only his additions to the world's record but for his disciples the entire scaffolding by which they were erected. — As We May Think

== Legacy ==
Bush said of his "As We May Think" memex device that "technical difficulties of all sorts have been ignored," but that, "also ignored are means as yet unknown which may come any day to accelerate technical progress as violently as did the advent of the thermionic tube." Michael Buckland concluded that Bush's 1945 vision for an information retrieval machine is unhistorically viewed in relation to the subsequent development of electronic computer technology. Buckland studied the historical background of information retrieval in and before 1939 because the Memex was based on Bush's work during 1938–1940 in building a photoelectric microfilm selector, an electronic retrieval technology invented by Emanuel Goldberg for Zeiss Ikon in the 1920s. According to Buckland, the legacy of Bush is twofold: a significant engineering achievement in building a rapid prototype microfilm selector, and "a speculative article" which through "the social prestige of its author, has had an immediate and lasting effect in stimulating others."

The pioneer of human–computer interaction Douglas Engelbart was inspired by Bush's proposal for a co-evolution between humans and machines. In a 1999 publication, Engelbart recollects that reading "As We May Think" in 1945 he "became 'infected' with the idea of building a means to extend and navigate this great pool of human knowledge". Around 1961, Engelbart re-read Bush's article, and from 1962 onward Engelbart developed a series of technical designs. Engelbart updated the Memex microfilm storage desk and thereby arrived at a pioneering vision for a personal computer connected to an electronic visual display and a mouse pointing device. In 1962, Engelbart sent Bush a draft article for comment; Bush never replied. The article was published in 1963 under the title "A Conceptual Framework for the Augmentation of Man's Intellect".

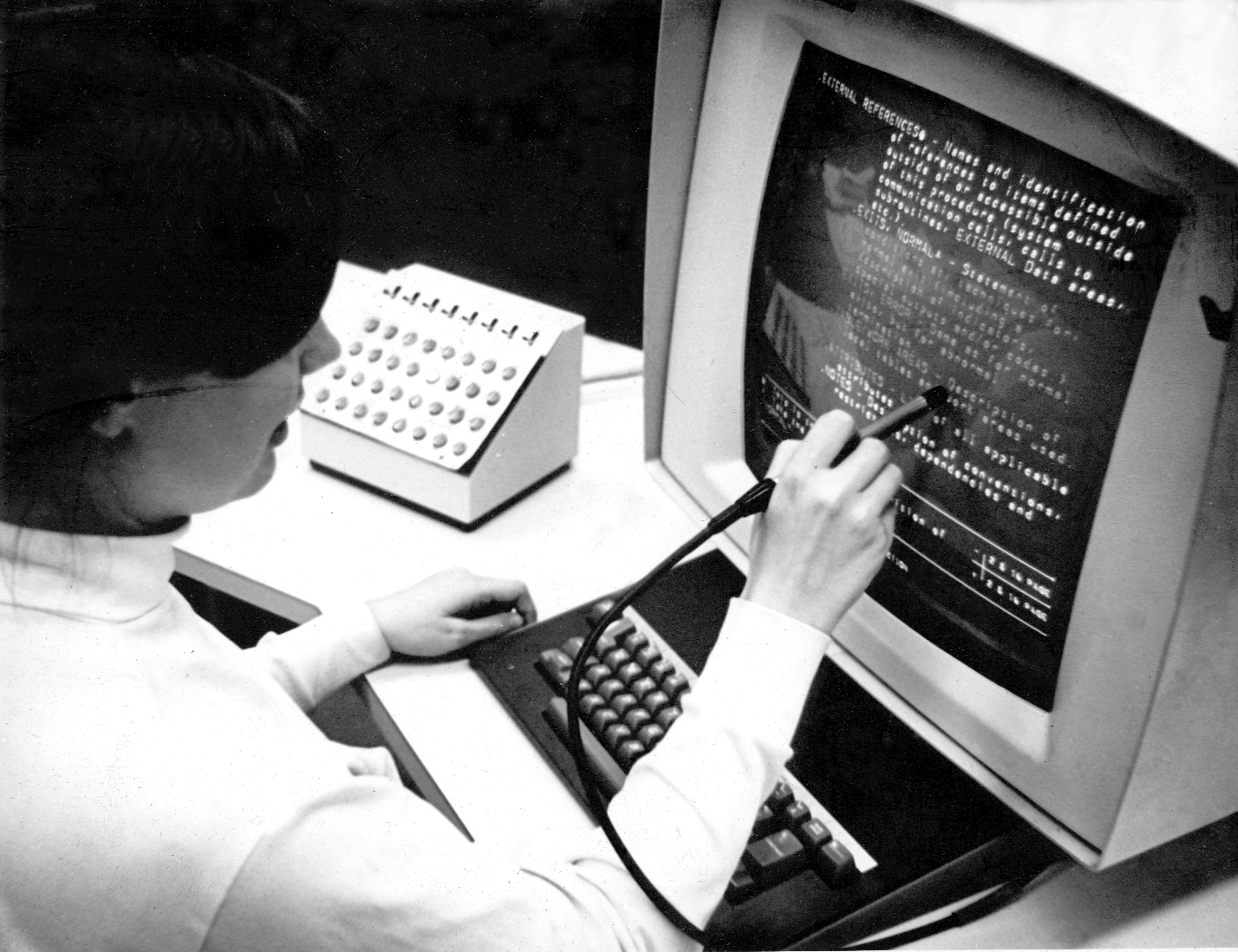
Hypertext Editing System (HES) IBM 2250 Display console – Brown University 1969

In 1965, J. C. R. Licklider dedicated his book Libraries of the Future to Bush. Licklider wrote that he had often heard of the memex and "trails of reference", even before he had read "As We May Think". Also in 1965, Ted Nelson coined the word "hypertext" in a paper that quoted Bush's memex idea at length. Nelson collaborated with Andries van Dam to implement the Hypertext Editing System (HES) in 1968. Nelson later defined hypertext as "non-sequential writing with reader-controlled links" in his 1987 book Literary Machines. Without prior knowledge of the ideas developed by Bush, Engelbart, and Nelson, Tim Berners-Lee built his ENQUIRE software at CERN in 1980. However, as Berners-Lee began to refine his ideas, the work of these predecessors would later help to confirm the legitimacy of his endeavor, which led to his invention of the World Wide Web in 1989. In 2003, Microsoft promoted a life-logging research project under the name MyLifeBits as an attempt to fulfill Bush's memex vision.

== 1959 Memex II ==
In 1959, Vannevar Bush described an improved "Memex II". In the manuscript draft of "Memex II" he wrote, "Professional societies will no longer print papers..." and states that individuals will either order sets of papers to come on tape – complete with photographs and diagrams – or download 'facsimiles' by telephone. Each society would maintain a 'master memex' containing all papers, references, tables "intimately interconnected by trails, so that one may follow a detailed matter from paper to paper, going back through the classics, recording criticism in the margins."

== 1967 Memex revisited ==
Vannevar Bush published the retrospective article "Memex Revisited" in his 1967 book Science Is Not Enough. Over two decades after his initial conception of the Memex, Bush details the various technological advancements that have made his vision a possibility. Specifically, Bush cites photocells, transistors, cathode ray tubes, magnetic and videotape, "high-speed electric circuits", and "miniaturization of solid-state devices" such as the TV and radio. The article claims that magnetic tape would be central to the creation of a modern Memex device. The erasable quality of the tape is of special significance, as this would allow for modification of information stored in the proposed Memex.

In the article, Bush stresses the continued importance of supplementing "how creative men think" and relates that the systems for indexing data are still insufficient and rely too much on linear pathways rather than the association-based system of the human brain. Bush writes that a machine with the "speed and flexibility" of the brain is not attainable, but improvements could be made in regard to the capacity to obtain informational "permanence and clarity".

Bush also relates that, unlike digital technology, Memex would be of no significant aid to business or profitable ventures, and as a consequence, its development would occur only long after the mechanization of libraries and the introduction of what he describes as the specialized "group machine", which would be useful for the sharing of ideas in fields such as medicine. Furthermore, although Bush discusses the compressional ability and rapidity so key to modern machines, he relates that speed will not be an integral part of Memex, stating that a tenth of a second would be an acceptable interval for its data retrieval, rather than the billionths of a second that modern computers are capable of. "For Memex," he writes, "the problem is not swift access, but selective access". Bush states that although the code-reading and potential linking capabilities of the rapid selector would be key to the creation of Memex, there is still an issue of enabling "moderately rapid access to really large memory storage". There is an issue concerning selection, Bush conveys, and despite the fact that improvements have been made in the speed of digital selection, according to Bush, "selection, in the broad sense, is still a stone adze in the hands of the cabinetmaker". Bush goes on to discuss the record-making process and how Memex could incorporate systems of voice-control and user-propagated learning. He proposes a machine that could respond to "simple remarks" as well as build trails based on its user's "habits of association," as Belinda Barnet described them in "The Technical Evolution of Vannevar Bush's Memex." Barnet also makes the distinction between the idea of a constructive Memex and the "permanent trails" described in As We May Think, and attributes Bush's machine learning concepts to Claude Shannon's mechanical mouse and work with "feedback and machine learning".

== DARPA Memex Program ==
In 2014, the Defense Advanced Research Projects Agency (DARPA), launched a program using the name Memex to fight human trafficking crimes on the dark web. Wade Shen, the program manager for Memex at DARPA cited Bush's hypothetical device as inspiration. DARPA later released the Memex artificial intelligence search technologies as open-source software.

In 2016 the White House awarded Chris White, the program manager for Memex, the Presidential Award for Extraordinary Efforts to Combat Trafficking in Persons for his work on Memex.

Dozens of law enforcement organizations worldwide use the Memex software to conduct investigations.

== See also ==
- AltaVista
- Card file
- Commonplace book
- Dublin Core
- Hypomnema
- Intelligence amplification
- Mechanical Encyclopaedia
- Metadata
- Mundaneum
- Office of the future
- Paul Otlet
- Project Xanadu
- Semantic Web
- Total Information Awareness
- Victorian Internet
- Web annotation
- World Brain

== Bibliography ==
- Barnet, Belinda (2013). Memory Machines: The Evolution of Hypertext. Anthem Press. ISBN 9780857281968.
- Bush, Vannevar (July 1945). "As We May Think". The Atlantic Monthly. Vol. 176, no. 1. pp. 101–8.
- Bush, Vannevar (1967). "Memex Revisited" (PDF). Science is Not Enough. Morrow.
- Cronin, Blaise, ed. (2006). Annual Review of Information Science and Technology 2007. Information Today Inc. ISBN 9781573872768.
- Leslie, Christopher. “As We Could Have Thought: Deploying Historical Narratives of the Memex in Support of Innovation.” Technology and Culture 61.2 (2020): 480–511.
- Smith, L. C. (1991). "Memex as an Image of Potentiality Revisited." In J. M. Nyce, & P. Kahn (Eds.), From Memex to Hypertext: Vannevar Bush and the Mind's Machine. (pp. 261–286). Academic Press.
- Wardrip-Fruin, Noah; Montfort, Nick, eds. (2003). The New Media Reader. MIT Press. ISBN 978-0-262-23227-2.
