= The Interactive Encyclopedia System =

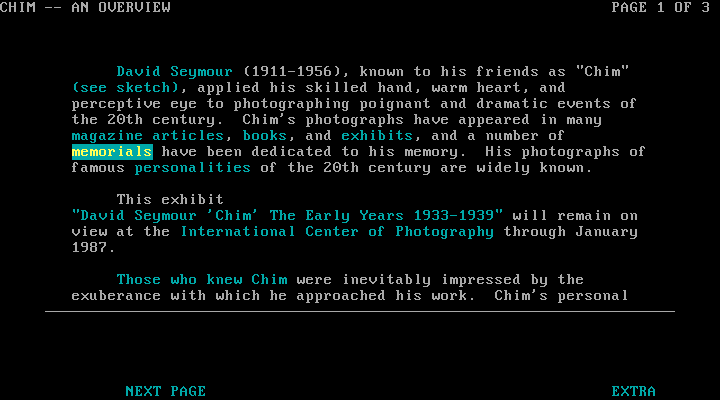
Screenshot of TIES

The Interactive Encyclopedia System, or TIES, was a hypertext system developed in the University of Maryland Human-Computer Interaction Lab by Ben Shneiderman in 1983. The earliest versions of TIES ran in DOS text mode, using the cursor arrow keys for navigating through information. A later version of HyperTIES for the Sun workstation was developed by Don Hopkins using the NeWS window system, with an authoring tool based on UniPress's Gosling Emacs text editor.

== HyperTIES ==
The TIES program has evolved into the HyperTIES commercial product, sold by the Cognetics Corporation. HyperTIES has a small feature set and has touch-screen support which makes it optimal for public displays and information kiosks. As for navigation types, only reference links are supported, which can be either text or graphics. The mouse pointer also highlights anchors when passing over them.
