= File Retrieval and Editing System =

Hypertext system

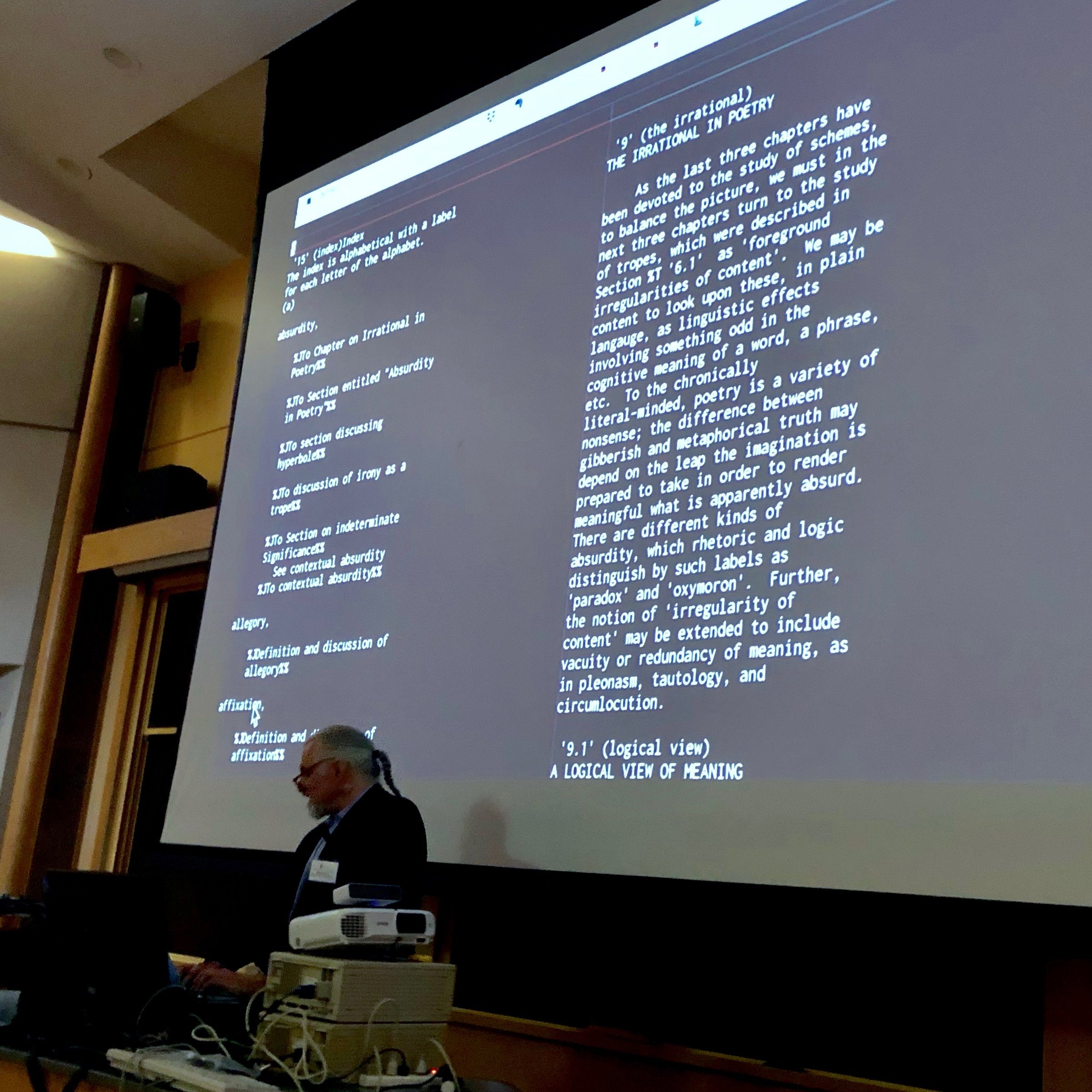
David Durand demonstrating the FRESS hypertext editing system at Brown University in 2019

The File Retrieval and Editing SyStem, or FRESS, was a hypertext system developed at Brown University starting in 1968 by Andries van Dam and his students, including Bob Wallace. It was the first hypertext system to run on readily available commercial hardware and OS. It is also possibly the first computer-based system to have had an "undo" feature for quickly correcting small editing or navigational mistakes.

== Features ==
FRESS was a continuation of work done on van Dam's previous hypertext system, HES, developed the previous year. FRESS ran on an IBM 360-series mainframe running VM/CMS. It improved on HES's capabilities in many ways, inspired by Douglas Engelbart's NLS. FRESS implemented one of the first virtual terminal interfaces, in order to provide device-independence. It could run on various terminals from dumb typewriters up to the Imlac PDS-1 graphical minicomputer. On the PDS-1, it supported multi-window WYSIWYG editing and graphics display. The PDS-1 used a light pen, not a mouse, and the light pen could be "clicked" using a foot-pedal.

FRESS allowed multiple users to collaborate on a set of documents, which could be of arbitrary size, and (unlike prior systems) were not laid out in lines until the moment of display. FRESS users could insert a marker at any location within a text document and link the marked selection to any other point, either in the same document or a different document. This was much like the World Wide Web of today, but without the need for the anchor hyperlinks that HTML requires. Links were also bi-directional, unlike in today's web.

FRESS had two types of links: tags and "jumps". Tags were links to information such as references or footnotes, while "jumps" were links that could take the user through many separate but related documents. FRESS also had the ability to assign keywords to links or text blocks to assist with navigation. Keywords could be used to select which sections to display or print, which links would be available to the user, and so on. Multiple "spaces" were also automatically maintained, including an automatic table of contents and indexes to keywords, document structures, and so on. Users could view a visualization of the "structure space" of the texts and cross-reference links, and could directly rearrange the structure space, and automatically update the links to match.

FRESS was essentially a text-based system and editing links was a fairly complex task unless you had access to the PDS-1 terminal, in which case you could select each end with the lightpen and create a link with a couple of keystrokes. FRESS provided no method for knowing where the user was within a collection of documents.

== Usage ==
FRESS was used as educational technology for several classes at Brown, probably being the first hypertext system used in education. Most notably, it was used for teaching an introduction to poetry in 1975 and 1976. In those days it was difficult to convince faculty in the humanities that computers could be useful in their teaching or work, or to convince the people funding the computer center that writing was an appropriate use of the expensive computers of the time. But English Professor Robert Scholes and two teaching assistants worked with the FRESS team to run a small experiment funded by the National Endowment for the Humanities. They saw hypertext as an attractive new way to present poetry, which is often highly reflexive and full of allusions and references to other works. They also wanted to help students directly interact with the course material, and engage with other students and instructors to collectively add meaning to it. There was only a single Imlac terminal, which students signed up for time on, so only 12 students per course could use FRESS. The students in the section which read and commented on the material via FRESS wrote about three times as much as students in control groups, and seemed to benefit from the use of the system, but given the small number of students in the study, the uncertainty in the results is high. A short film was made to document the project, which was rediscovered and shown as part of NEH's 50th anniversary celebration.

FRESS was for many years the word processor of choice at Brown and a small number of other sites. It was used for typesetting many books, including those by Roderick Chisholm, Robert Coover and Rosmarie Waldrop. For example, in the Preface to Person and Object Chisholm writes "The book would not have been completed without the epoch-making File Retrieval and Editing System..."

Through the diligent work of Alan Hecht, FRESS survived a major OS upgrade around 1978. Around the same time, Jonathan Prusky wrote thorough user documentation for the system as well, in The FRESS Resource Manual. Although support had to be withdrawn a few years later for lack of resources and while rarely used, FRESS still runs on the current Brown mainframe.

For the ACM Hypertext '89 conference, David Durand reverse-engineered the PDS-1 terminal and created an emulator for the Apple Macintosh. He and Steven DeRose, the last FRESS project director, recovered the old poetry class databases and gave live demos on this and a few later occasions.

== Documentary Film ==
- Andries van Dam: Hypertext: an Educational Experiment in English and Computer Science at Brown University. Brown University, Providence, RI, U.S. 1974, Run time 15:16, Hypertext at IMDb, Full Movie on the Internet Archive
