= Hypertext =

Text with references (links) to other text that the reader can immediately access

Visual abstraction of several documents being connected by hyperlinks

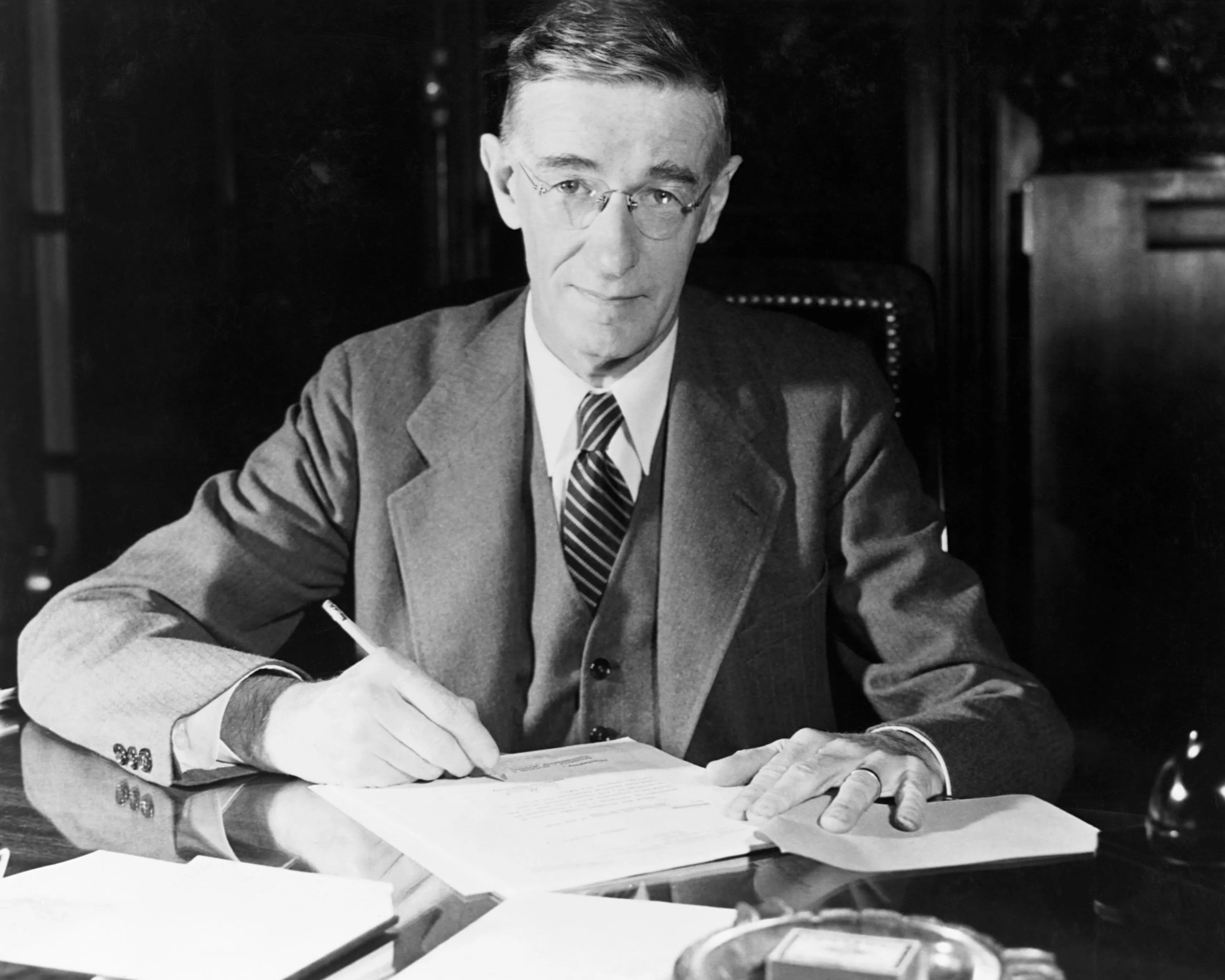
Engineer Vannevar Bush wrote "As We May Think" in July 1945 in which he described the Memex, a theoretical proto-hypertext device which in turn helped inspire the subsequent invention of hypertext.

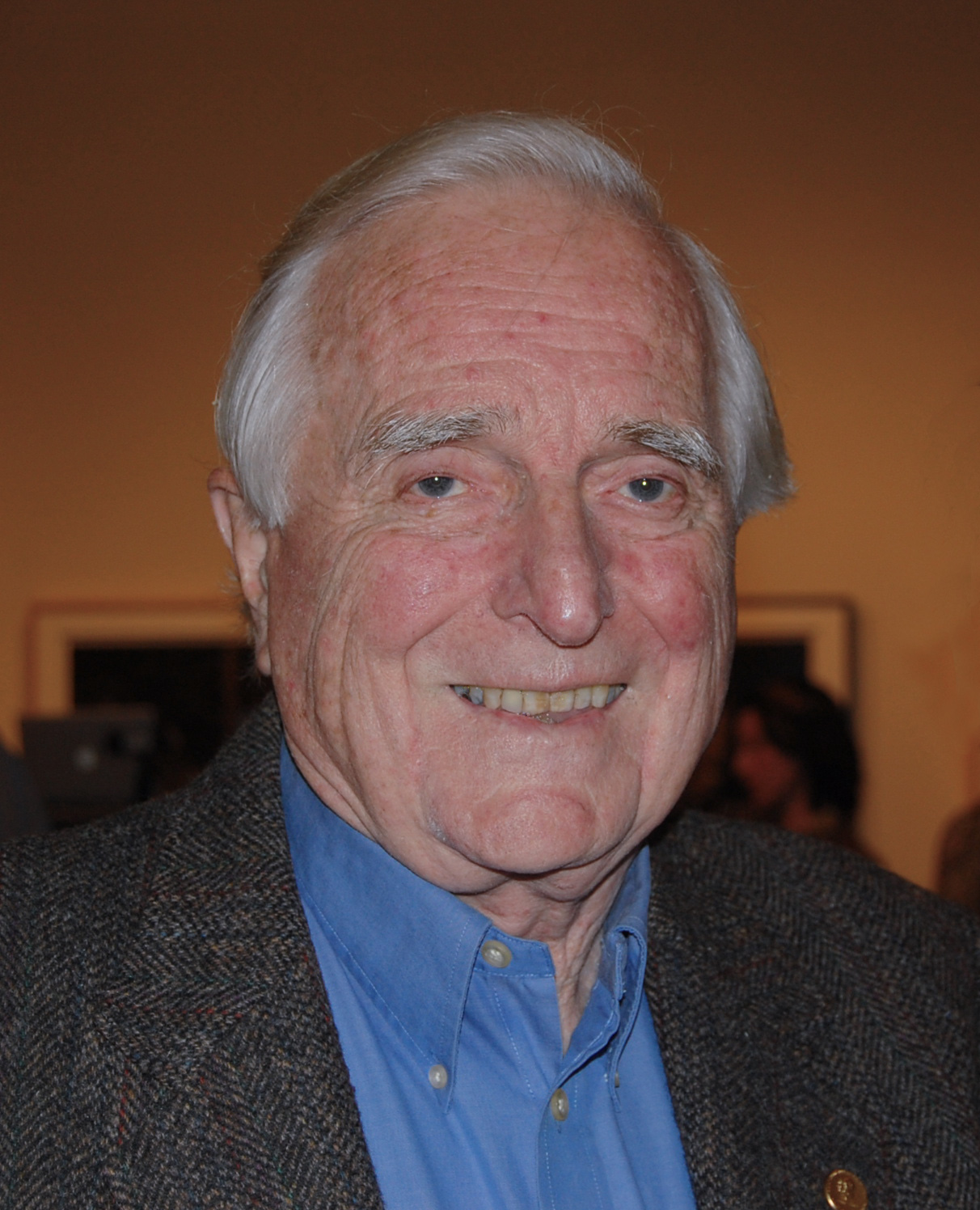
Douglas Engelbart in 2009, at the 40th anniversary celebrations of "The Mother of All Demos" in San Francisco, a 90-minute 1968 presentation of the NLS computer system which was a combination of hardware and software that demonstrated many hypertext ideas

Hypertext is text displayed on a computer display or other electronic devices with references (hyperlinks) to other text that the reader can immediately access. Hypertext documents are interconnected by hyperlinks, which are typically activated by a mouse click, keypress set, or screen touch. Apart from text, the term "hypertext" is also used to describe tables, images, and other presentational materials with integrated hyperlinks. Hypertext is one of the key underlying concepts of the World Wide Web, where Web pages are often written in the Hypertext Markup Language (HTML). As implemented on the Web, hypertext enables the easy-to-use publication of information over the Internet.

== Etymology ==
"(...)'Hypertext' is a recent coinage. 'Hyper-' is used in the mathematical sense of extension and generality (as in 'hyperspace,' 'hypercube') rather than the medical sense of 'excessive' ('hyperactivity'). There is no implication about size— a hypertext could contain only 500 words or so. 'Hyper-' refers to structure and not size."

— Theodor H. Nelson, Brief Words on the Hypertext, 23 January 1967

The English prefix "hyper-" comes from the Greek prefix "ὑπερ-" and means "over" or "beyond"; it has a common origin with the prefix "super-" which comes from Latin. It signifies the overcoming of the previous linear constraints of written text.

The term "hypertext" is often used where the term "hypermedia" might seem appropriate.

In 1992, author Ted Nelson – who coined both terms in 1965 – wrote:

By now the word "hypertext" has become generally accepted for branching and responding text, but the corresponding word "hypermedia", meaning complexes of branching and responding graphics, movies and sound – as well as text – is much less used. Instead they use the strange term "interactive multimedia": this is four syllables longer, and does not express the idea of extending hypertext.

— Nelson, Literary Machines, 1992

== Types and uses of hypertext ==
Hypertext documents can either be static (prepared and stored in advance) or dynamic (continually changing in response to user input, such as dynamic web pages). Static hypertext can be used to cross-reference collections of data in documents, software applications, or books on CDs. A well-constructed system can also incorporate other user-interface conventions, such as menus and command lines. Links used in a hypertext document usually replace the current piece of hypertext with the destination document. A lesser known feature is StretchText, which expands or contracts the content in place, thereby giving more control to the reader in determining the level of detail of the displayed document. Some implementations support transclusion, where text or other content is included by reference and automatically rendered in place.

Hypertext can be used to support very complex and dynamic systems of linking and cross-referencing. The most famous implementation of hypertext is the World Wide Web, written in the final months of 1990 and released on the Internet in 1991.

== History ==
In 1941, Jorge Luis Borges published "The Garden of Forking Paths", a short story that is often considered an inspiration for the concept of hypertext.

In 1945, Vannevar Bush wrote an article in The Atlantic Monthly called "As We May Think", about a futuristic proto-hypertext device he called a Memex. A Memex would hypothetically store — and record — content on reels of microfilm, using electric photocells to read coded symbols recorded next to individual microfilm frames while the reels spun at high speed, and stopping on command. The coded symbols would enable the Memex to index, search, and link content to create and follow associative trails. Because the Memex was never implemented and could only link content in a relatively crude fashion — by creating chains of entire microfilm frames — the Memex is regarded only as a proto-hypertext device, but it is fundamental to the history of hypertext because it directly inspired the invention of hypertext by Ted Nelson and Douglas Engelbart.

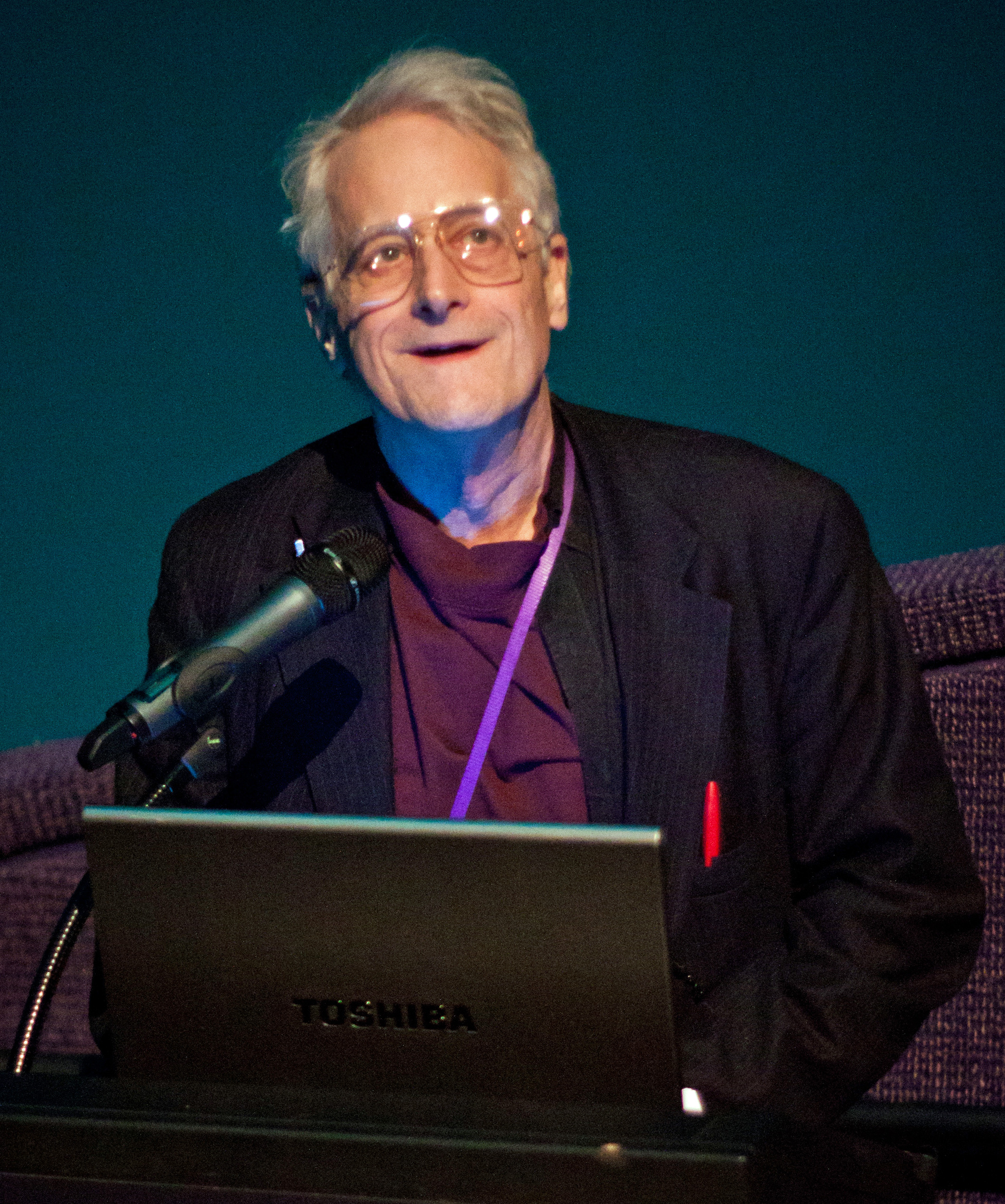
Ted Nelson gives a presentation on Project Xanadu, a theoretical hypertext model conceived in the 1960s whose first and incomplete implementation was first published in 1998.

In 1965, Ted Nelson coined the terms 'hypertext' and 'hypermedia' as part of a model he developed for creating and using linked content (first published reference 1965). He later worked with Andries van Dam to develop the Hypertext Editing System (text editing) in 1967 at Brown University. It was implemented using the terminal IBM 2250 with a light pen which was provided as a pointing device. By 1976, its successor FRESS was used in a poetry class in which students could browse a hyperlinked set of poems and discussion by experts, faculty and other students, in what was arguably the world's first online scholarly community which van Dam says "foreshadowed wikis, blogs and communal documents of all kinds". Ted Nelson said in the 1960s that he began implementation of a hypertext system he theorized, which was named Project Xanadu, but his first and incomplete public release was finished much later, in 1998. During this period, Nelson also proposed using Vladimir Nabokov's 1962 novel Pale Fire as part of a demonstration to IBM, intending to show how hypertext could support complex, non-linear forms of literary analysis. The novel, structured as a long poem with an extensive, self-referential commentary and index, embodied the principles of associative linking and user-directed navigation that Nelson believed defined hypertext. Its layered design enabled readers to follow multiple interpretive paths through the text, resembling the branching structures later implemented in digital hypertext systems. However, IBM chose a more technically conventional presentation, and the literary demonstration was never realized.

Douglas Engelbart independently began working on his NLS system in 1962 at Stanford Research Institute, although delays in obtaining funding, personnel, and equipment meant that its key features were not completed until 1968. In December of that year, Engelbart demonstrated a 'hypertext' (meaning editing) interface to the public for the first time, in what has come to be known as "The Mother of All Demos".

In 1971 a system called Scrapbook, produced by David Yates and his team at the UK's National Physical Laboratory, went live. It was an information storage and retrieval system that included what would now be called word processing, e-mail and hypertext.

ZOG, an early hypertext system, was developed at Carnegie Mellon University during the 1970s, used for documents on Nimitz class aircraft carriers, and later evolving as KMS (Knowledge Management System).

The first hypermedia application is generally considered to be the Aspen Movie Map, implemented in 1978. The Movie Map allowed users to arbitrarily choose which way they wished to drive in a virtual cityscape, in two seasons (from actual photographs) as well as 3-D polygons.

In France, the launch of the Minitel system in 1982 provided widespread public access to interactive digital content via telephone lines and videotex terminals. Minitel allowed users to search directories, make purchases, read news, and access databases using a system of on-screen menus and numbered links. Although it was based on videotex rather than the dynamic linking protocols of later hypertext systems, Minitel introduced many users to the practice of navigating non-linear networks of information. Its use of branching menus and user-selected paths anticipated key aspects of hypertext interaction, particularly the idea of browsing through interconnected data by following associative or logical links. As one of the earliest large-scale deployments of an online information service, Minitel helped familiarize the public with interactive computing and laid cultural groundwork for the broader adoption of hypertext and web technologies in the 1990s.

Between 1984 and 1987 Frank Halasz, Randall Trigg, and Thomas Moran developed NoteCards at Xerox PARC. This early hypertext system was designed to support information analysis and idea processing, employing a central metaphor of "notecards" which operated as discrete units of information that could contain text or graphics. These notecards could be interconnected through typed, directional links, enabling users to create semantically distinct relationships. A key component of NoteCards was the "Browser card," which provided a graphical overview of the structure of linked notecards, facilitating navigation within complex information networks.

Operating on Xerox Lisp machines, NoteCards' primary impact was within the research community rather than as a commercial product. Its most significant contribution to the field of hypertext is often attributed to the insights gained from its use, Halasz identified critical challenges such as search and query in large hypertexts, composite structures, versioning, and collaborative work.

In 1980, Tim Berners-Lee created ENQUIRE, an early hypertext database system somewhat like a wiki but without hypertext punctuation, which was not invented until 1987. The early 1980s also saw a number of experimental "hyperediting" functions in word processors and hypermedia programs, many of whose features and terminology were later analogous to the World Wide Web. Guide, the first significant hypertext system for personal computers, was developed by Peter J. Brown at the University of Kent in 1982.

In 1980, Roberto Busa, an Italian Jesuit priest and one of the pioneers in the usage of computers for linguistic and literary analysis, published the Index Thomisticus, as a tool for performing text searches within the massive corpus of Aquinas's works. Sponsored by the founder of IBM, Thomas J. Watson, the project lasted about 30 years (1949–1980), and eventually produced the 56 printed volumes of the Index Thomisticus the first important hypertext work about Saint Thomas Aquinas books and of a few related authors.

In 1983, Ben Shneiderman at the University of Maryland Human - Computer Interaction Lab led a group that developed the HyperTies system that was commercialized by Cognetics Corporation. They studied many designs before adopting the blue color for links. Hyperties was used to create the July 1988 issue of the Communications of the ACM as a hypertext document and then the first commercial electronic book Hypertext Hands-On!.

In 1985, Grolier's Academic American Encyclopedia on CD-ROM was developed by Activenture. The encyclopedia could be navigated through hypertext links, a full text search engine, and a traditional bookshelf interface.

In August 1987, Apple Computer released HyperCard for the Macintosh line at the MacWorld convention. Its impact, combined with interest in Peter J. Brown's GUIDE (marketed by OWL and released earlier that year) and Brown University's Intermedia, led to broad interest in and enthusiasm for hypertext, hypermedia, databases, and new media in general. The first ACM Hypertext (hyperediting and databases) academic conference took place in November 1987, in Chapel Hill NC, where many other applications, including the branched literature writing software Storyspace, were also demonstrated.

Meanwhile, Nelson (who had been working on and advocating his Xanadu system for over two decades) convinced Autodesk to invest in his revolutionary ideas. The project continued at Autodesk for four years, but no product was released.

In 1989, Tim Berners-Lee, then a scientist at CERN, proposed and later prototyped a new hypertext project in response to a request for a simple, immediate, information-sharing facility, to be used among physicists working at CERN and other academic institutions. He called the project "WorldWideWeb".

HyperText is a way to link and access information of various kinds as a web of nodes in which the user can browse at will. Potentially, HyperText provides a single user-interface to many large classes of stored information, such as reports, notes, data-bases, computer documentation and on-line systems help. We propose the implementation of a simple scheme to incorporate several different servers of machine-stored information already available at CERN, including an analysis of the requirements for information access needs by experiments... A program which provides access to the hypertext world we call a browser. ― T. Berners-Lee, R. Cailliau, 12 November 1990, CERN

In 1992, Lynx was born as an early Internet web browser. Its ability to provide hypertext links within documents that could reach into documents anywhere on the Internet began the creation of the Web on the Internet.

As new web browsers were released, traffic on the World Wide Web quickly exploded from only 500 known web servers in 1993 to over 10,000 in 1994. As a result, all previous hypertext systems were overshadowed by the success of the Web, even though it lacked many features of those earlier systems, such as integrated browsers/editors (a feature of the original WorldWideWeb browser, which was not carried over into most of the other early Web browsers).

== Implementations ==
Besides the already mentioned Project Xanadu, Hypertext Editing System, NLS, HyperCard, and World Wide Web, there are other noteworthy early implementations of hypertext, with different feature sets:

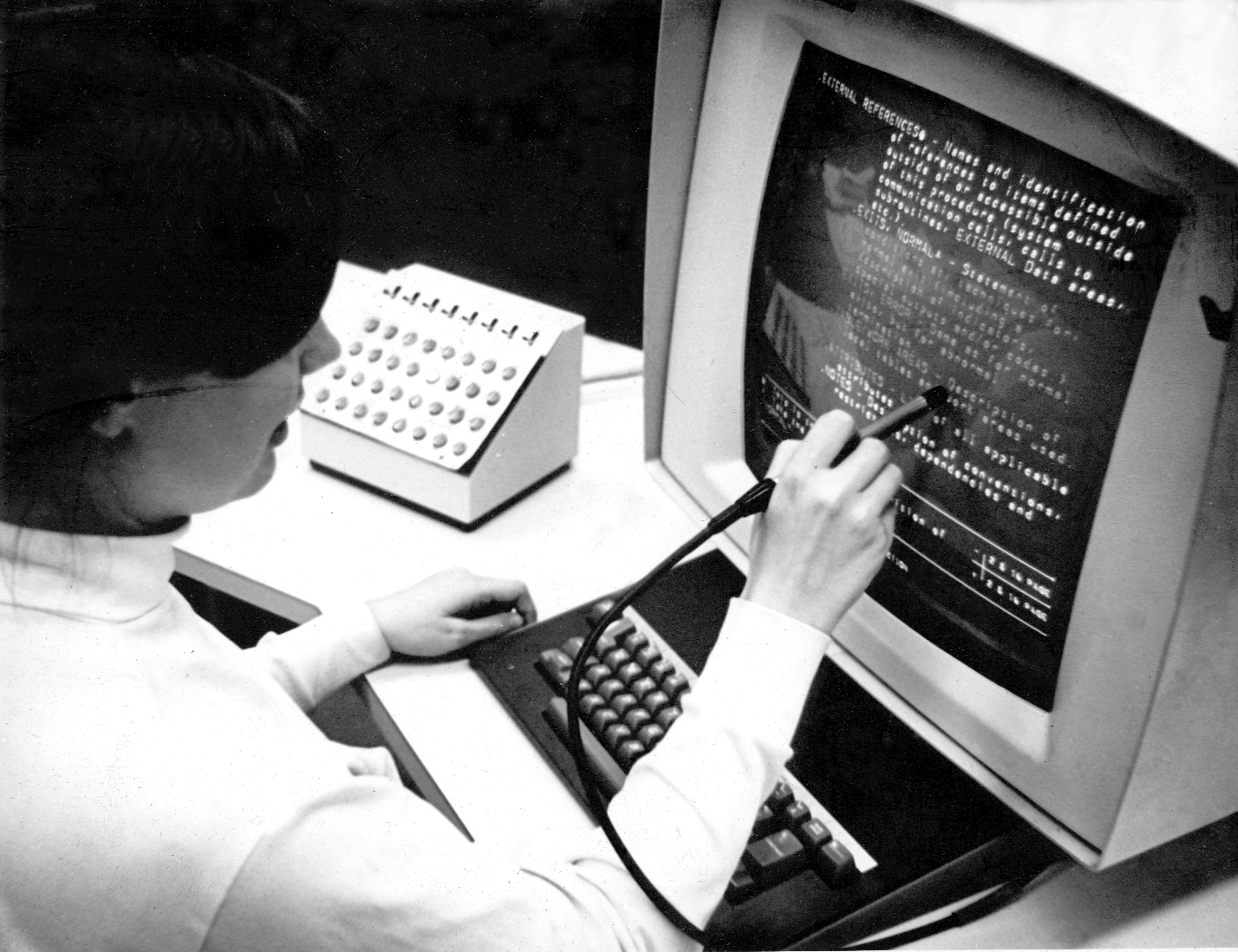
Hypertext Editing System (HES) IBM 2250 Display console – Brown University 1969

- FRESS – a 1970s multi-user successor to the Hypertext Editing System.
- ZOG – a 1970s hypertext system developed at Carnegie Mellon University.
- Electronic Document System – an early 1980s text and graphic editor for interactive hypertexts such as equipment repair manuals and computer-aided instruction.
- Information Presentation Facility – used to display online help in IBM operating systems.
- Intermedia – a mid-1980s program for group web-authoring and information sharing.
- HyperTies - a mid-1980s program commercially applied to hundreds of projects, including July 1988 Communications of the ACM and Hypertext Hands-On! book.
- Texinfo – the GNU help system.
- KMS – a 1980s successor to ZOG developed as a commercial product.
- NoteCards – a mid-1980s system from Xerox PARC using a notecard metaphor and graphical browser for idea processing
- Storyspace – a mid-1980s program for hypertext narrative.
- Document Examiner - an hypertext system developed in 1985 at Symbolics for their Genera operating system.
- Adobe's Portable Document Format – a widely used publication format for electronic documents.
- Amigaguide – released on the Commodore Amiga Workbench 1990.
- Windows Help – released with Windows 3.0 in 1990.
- Wikis – aim to compensate for the lack of integrated editors in most Web browsers. Various wiki software have slightly different conventions for formatting, usually simpler than HTML.
- PaperKiller – a document editor specifically designed for hypertext. Started in 1996 as IPer (educational project for ED-Media 1997).
- XML with the XLink extension – a newer hypertext markup language that extends and expands capabilities introduced by HTML.

== Academic conferences ==
Among the top academic conferences for new research in hypertext is the annual ACM Conference on Hypertext and Social Media. The Electronic Literature Organization hosts annual conferences discussing hypertext fiction, poetry and other forms of electronic literature. Although not exclusively about hypertext, the World Wide Web series of conferences, organized by IW3C2, also include many papers of interest. There is a list on the Web with links to all conferences in the series.

== Hypertext fiction ==
Hypertext writing has developed its own style of fiction, coinciding with the growth and proliferation of hypertext development software and the emergence of electronic networks. Hypertext fiction is one of earliest genres of electronic literature, or literary works that are designed to be read in digital media. Two software programs specifically designed for literary hypertext, Storyspace and Intermedia, became available in the 1990s. Judy Malloy's Uncle Roger (1986) and Michael Joyce's afternoon, a story (1987) are generally considered the first works of hypertext fiction.

An advantage of writing a narrative using hypertext technology is that the meaning of the story can be conveyed through a sense of spatiality and perspective that is arguably unique to digitally networked environments. An author's creative use of nodes, the self-contained units of meaning in a hypertextual narrative, can play with the reader's orientation and add meaning to the text.

One of the most successful computer games, Myst, was first written in HyperCard. The game was constructed as a series of Ages, each Age consisting of a separate HyperCard stack. The full stack of the game consists of over 2500 cards. In some ways, Myst redefined interactive fiction, using puzzles and exploration as a replacement for hypertextual narrative.

Critics of hypertext claim that it inhibits the old, linear, reader experience by creating several different tracks to read on. This can also been seen as contributing to a postmodernist fragmentation of worlds. In some cases, hypertext may be detrimental to the development of appealing stories (in the case of hypertext Gamebooks), where ease of linking fragments may lead to non-cohesive or incomprehensible narratives. However, they do see value in its ability to present several different views on the same subject in a simple way. This echoes the arguments of 'medium theorists' like Marshall McLuhan who look at the social and psychological impacts of the media. New media can become so dominant in public culture that they effectively create a "paradigm shift" as people have shifted their perceptions, understanding of the world, and ways of interacting with the world and each other in relation to new technologies and media. So hypertext signifies a change from linear, structured and hierarchical forms of representing and understanding the world into fractured, decentralized and changeable media based on the technological concept of hypertext links.

In the 1990s, women and feminist artists took advantage of hypertext and produced dozens of works. Linda Dement's Cyberflesh Girlmonster a hypertext CD-ROM that incorporates images of women's body parts and remixes them to create new monstrous yet beautiful shapes. Caitlin Fisher's award-winning online hypertext novella These Waves of Girls (2001) is set in three time periods of the protagonist exploring polymorphous perversity enacted in her queer identity through memory. The story is written as a reflection diary of the interconnected memories of childhood, adolescence, and adulthood. It consists of an associated multi-modal collection of nodes includes linked text, still and moving images, manipulable images, animations, and sound clips. Adrienne Eisen (pen name for Penelope Trunk) wrote hypertexts that were subversive narrative journeys into the mind of a woman whose erotic encounters were charged with a post-feminist satirical edge that cuts deep into the American psyche.

=== Forms ===
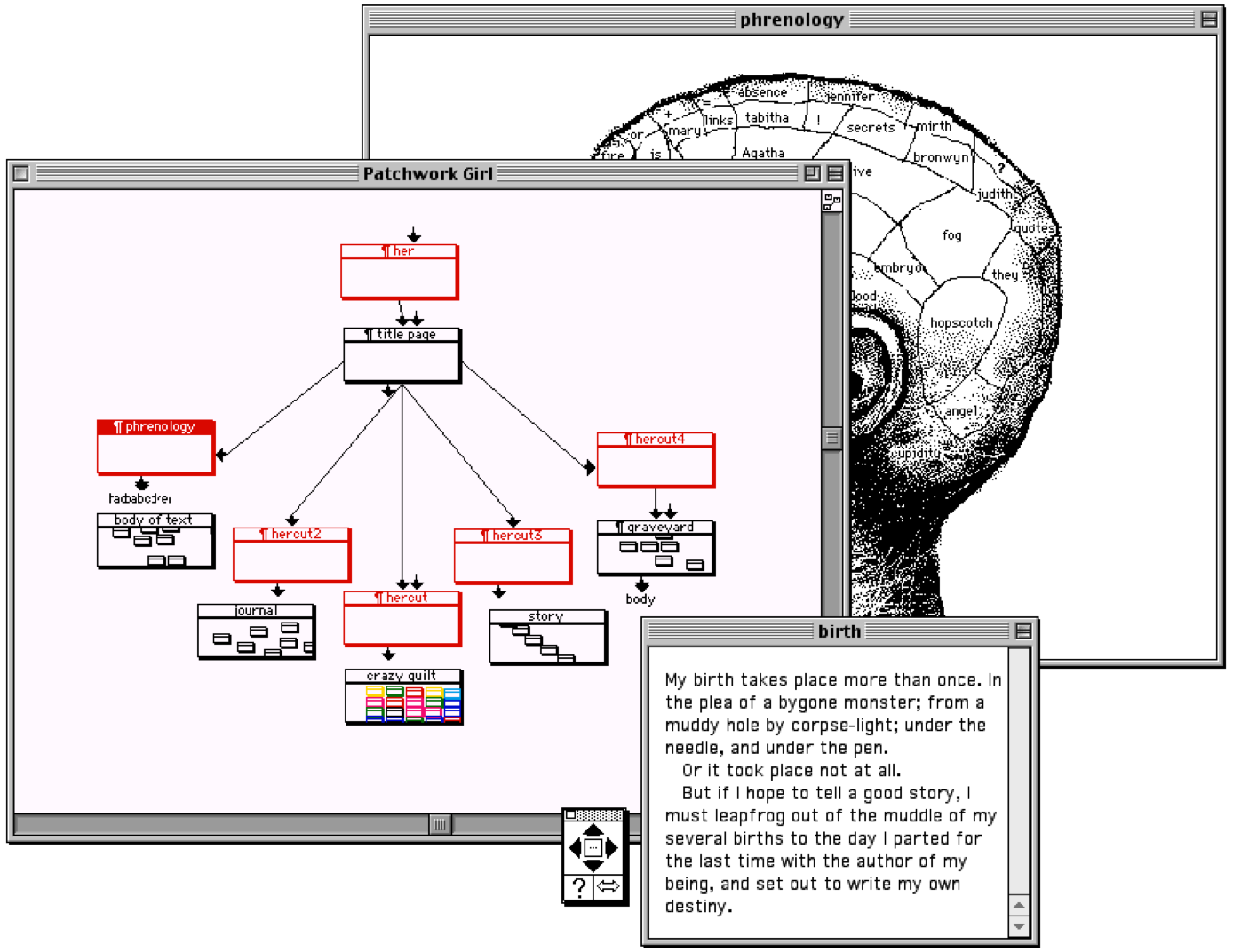
A screenshot from a reading of Shelley Jackson's Patchwork Girl, where windows layer on top of each other

There are various forms of hypertext fiction, each of which is structured differently. Below are four:

- Axial hypertext fiction has the simplest structure. Its hypertext is situated along a linear axis. With a straight path from beginning to end, it is fairly easy for the reader to follow. An example of an axial hypertext fiction is The Virtual Disappearance of Miriam.
- Arborescent hypertext fiction is more complex than the axial form. Its hypertext has a branching structure which resembles a tree, representing one beginning but many possible endings. The branches followed and ultimately the ending reached are determined by choices made by the reader at each branch point in the narrative. This is much like gamebook novels that allow readers to choose their own ending.
- Networked hypertext fiction is more complex than both axial and arborescent forms. It consists of an interconnected system of nodes with no dominant axis of orientation. Unlike the arborescent form, networked hypertexts do not have any designated beginning or any designated endings. An example of a networked hypertext is Shelley Jackson's Patchwork Girl.
- Layered hypertext fiction consist of two layers of linked pages. Each layer is doubly linked sequentially and a page in the top layer is doubly linked with a corresponding page in the bottom layer. The top layer contains plain text, the bottom multimedia layer provides photos, sounds and video. In the Dutch historical novel De man met de hoed designed as layered hypertext in 2006 by Eisjen Schaaf, Pauline van de Ven, and Paul Vitányi, the structure is proposed to enhance the atmosphere of the time, to enrich the text with research and family archive material and to enable readers to insert memories of their own while preserving tension and storyline.

== See also ==
- Timeline of hypertext technology
- Cybertext
- Distributed Data Management Architecture
- HTML (HyperText Markup Language)
- HTTP
- Hyperkino
- Anchor text

== Documentary film ==
- Andries van Dam: Hypertext: an Educational Experiment in English and Computer Science at Brown University. Brown University, Providence, RI, U.S. 1974, Run time 15:16, Hypertext at IMDb, Full Movie on the Internet Archive

== Bibliography ==
- Green, Lelia (2001), Technoculture: From Alphabet to Cybersex, Allen & Unwin Ep, ISBN 978-1-86508048-2.
