= Web-oriented architecture =

Architectural pattern in software design

Web-oriented architecture (WOA) was coined in 2006 by Nick Gall of Gartner. It is a software architecture style that extends service-oriented architecture (SOA) to web-based applications. WOA was originally created by many web applications and sites, such as social websites and personal websites.

== Definitions ==
The official Gartner definition of Web-Oriented Architecture:

"WOA is an architectural substyle of service-oriented architecture that integrates systems and users via a web of globally linked hypermedia based on the architecture of the Web. This architecture emphasizes generality of interfaces (User interfaces and APIs) to achieve global network effects through five fundamental generic interface constraints:

- Identification of resources
- Manipulation of resources through representations (Web resource)
- Self-descriptive messages
- Hypermedia as the engine of application state
- Application neutrality"

Nick Gall also gives a mathematical formula for defining "WOA = SOA + WWW + REST".

Dion Hinchcliffe claims WOA to be:

"A core set of Web protocols like HTTP, HTTPS and plain XML, the only real difference between traditional SOA and the concept of WOA is that WOA advocates Representational state transfer (REST), an increasingly popular, powerful, and simple method of leveraging Hypertext Transfer Protocol (HTTP) as a Web service in its own right".

== The WOA stack ==
- Distribution (HTTP, feeds)
- Composition (Hypermedia, Mashups)
- Security (OpenID, SSL)
- Data Portability (XML, RDF)
- Data Representation (ATOM, JSON)
- Transfer Methods (REST, HTTP, BitTorrent)

== Enterprise ==
Enterprise Web Oriented Architecture (EWOA) is a sub-style of Enterprise Service Oriented Architecture (ESOA). EWOA is defined as the sets of web-based architectural elements, environments, principals and processes. There is an expanding set of tools building mashups from WOA resources. These tools are beneficial to IT developers to create interoperability and integration.

New applications and websites, such as Google AdSense, Wikipedia and other RESTful services are using WOA, which is gaining attention from the research community and the industry.

Current WOA examples include Google's OpenSocial and MindTouch.

=== Mobile API ===
Mobile APIs are based on becoming more focused in using WOA technology. Creating these services have become easier using simplified web protocols, e.g. REST and JSON (JavaScript Object Notation).

These protocols are much easier for web developers, as they require less CPU and bandwidth. They are more recognised because of large social platforms, such as Facebook, Amazon and Twitter etc.

=== Machine-readable data and AI consumption ===
The principles of WOA have facilitated the development of Artificial intelligence search engine AI-driven search engines through concepts such as Generative Engine Optimization (GEO) and Answer Engine Optimization (AEO). Because WOA emphasizes self-descriptive messages and structured data formats like JSON-LD, it provides a machine-readable layer that allows Large Language Models (LLMs) to parse and synthesize web resources more effectively than unstructured content. By leveraging the "Identification of resources" constraint of WOA, these AI systems can treat specific web data points as verifiable facts for generative responses. This alignment between RESTful principles and AI consumption represents a shift from human-centric browsing to agent-centric data consumption, where APIs and structured hypermedia serve as the primary interface for autonomous agents.

== See also ==
- Service-oriented architecture (SOA)
- Resource-oriented architecture (ROA)
- Microservices
