= Hyperland =

- Genre: Technology
- Written by: Douglas Adams
- Presented by: Douglas Adams; Tom Baker
- Country of origin: United Kingdom
- Original language: English
- No. of series: 1
- No. of episodes: 1

Production
- Producer: Max Whitby
- Running time: 50 minutes
- Production company: BBC

Original release
- Network: BBC Two
- Release: 21 September 1990

Hyperland is a 50-minute-long documentary film about hypertext and surrounding technologies. It was written by Douglas Adams and produced and directed by Max Whitby for BBC Two in 1990. It stars Douglas Adams as a computer user and Tom Baker, with whom Adams had already worked on Doctor Who, as a personification of a software agent.

In hindsight, what Hyperland describes and predicts is an approximation of today's World Wide Web.

== Content ==
The self-proclaimed "fantasy documentary" begins with Adams asleep by the fireside with his television still on. In a dream that follows, Adams, fed up by game shows and generally passive, non-interactive linear content, takes his TV to a rubbish dump, where he meets Tom, played by Tom Baker. Tom is a software agent, who shows him the future of TV: interactive multimedia.

Tom Baker plays a "software agent," whose appearance can be manipulated by Douglas Adams. Here, Adams has (temporarily) configured Tom to look like a stereotypical Neanderthal.

Much like Apple Inc's Knowledge Navigator concept, Tom acts as a butler within a virtual space populated with hypermedia: linked text, sound, pictures and movies represented by animated icons. The documentary is centred on Adams browsing these media and discovering their interconnectedness.

This process leads him, for example, from the topic Atlantic Ocean to literature about the sea to The Rime of the Ancient Mariner by Samuel Taylor Coleridge to the poem Kubla Khan by the same author to Xanadu and back to the topic of hypertext via Ted Nelson's Project Xanadu.

=== Multimedia ===
Adams navigates through the interviews and explanations in the documentary using animated icons. Playback controls shown in the bottom right corner during each interview convey an additional sense of interactivity.

While Adams is browsing, many people and projects related to the general theme of hypertext and multimedia are presented:

- Vannevar Bush and his Memex concept of a theoretical proto-hypertext information system are shown.
- Ted Nelson explains hypertext and Project Xanadu.
- Hans Peter Brøndmo talks about the concept of animated navigation icons, which he calls Micons.
- Robert Winter talks about an interactive version of Beethoven's 9th Symphony.
- An idea from Kurt Vonnegut's book Palm Sunday is presented: stories and narrative structures have shapes that can be represented mathematically as graphs.
- Robert Abel shows his multimedia version of Pablo Picasso's Guernica.
- Apple Multimedia Lab employees Steve Gano, Kristee Kreitman, Kristina Hooper, Michael Naimark and Fabrice Florin talk about a multimedia version of Life Story, a BBC TV film dramatisation of the 1953 discovery of the structure of DNA.
- Amanda Goodenough presents Inigo Gets Out, an interactive story for children implemented with Hypercard.
- Brad deGraf and Michael Wahrman talk about their digital puppet Mike Normal.
- A NASA Ames Research Center scientist presents a prototype virtual reality helmet called Cyberiad.
- Marc Canter appears in an animated icon that isn't clicked by Adams.

The dream (and the documentary) ends with a vision of how information might be accessed in 2005.
