= Web tasking =

Web Tasking is a set of web user interactions in hypermedia purposefully conducted for the performance of tasks. Web tasking is a term coined intentionally to contrast web browsing (understood as exploration of the World Wide Web by following one interesting link to another, usually with a definite objective but without a planned search strategy)

== Motivation ==
The web was originally designed as an information space through which people and machines communicate and exchange information. Web browsing through hypermedia links is the primary web interaction model optimal for such purpose. As the web evolves, web users conduct tasks today in web interaction model that was originally designed for information search and exchange. Optimal Web Interactions for task performance was not the web's original design concern.

Web tasking is distinguished from web browsing. The user goal of web browsing web interactions is for information retrieval through users' traversal of ad-hoc, user-driven, sequence of hypermedia links. The user goal of web tasking web interactions is for task performance through traversal of user-defined, purposeful sequence of hypermedia links.

The most critical and common characteristic in both web tasking and web browsing is that web users have freedom to act autonomously, with web interactions constrained to hypermedia links, without any programming requirement nor dependency.

Web tasking, by definition, is the web interaction by which web users freely construct & automate their own tasks, using resources of their choice from across web, but independent of IT, like the freedom of interactions users experience in web browsing for information retrieval. Web tasking inter-operates seamlessly across resources from internet of things; or from enterprises' systems of record; or from other web sources. Then captured in a special media type, so that machine can execute, honoring conditions of execution that user-specified. Machine executes user-construct tasks on user's behalf through hypermedia links,

Perspectives	Web Browsing	Web Tasking
Purpose of Web Interactions	Information Retrieval and Search	Task Performance
Resource Access	Read Only	Create, Read, Update, Delete
State Transition	Ad Hoc	Predictive, Repeatable
Interaction Consequence	No server-side side effect	Server-side transactional side effect

== History ==
The term "Web Tasking" was originally coined by two researchers from IBM Canada CAS Research, Joanna Ng and Diana H. Lau, in "Going Beyond Web Browsing to Web Tasking: Transforming Web Users from Web Operators to Web Supervisors" to depict a set or a sequence of web interactions through hypermedia links for the purpose of performance of tasks. Task elements typically may include a goal, a set of information cues, an action and an outcome (or product). The interaction model of web browsing works well for the web’s original purpose of information search and retrieval. Though the purpose of the web has been extended beyond information search and retrieval into hypermedia-based task executions, the original web interaction model has not been enhanced for native web tasking support.

The first international academic conference about the subject was held in June, 2013 IEEE 2013 Services Conference First International Workshop on Personalized Web Tasking.

The second international academic conference was held in June/July, 2014 Second International Conference for Personalized Web Tasking

== Scope ==
Like web browsing, web tasking is distributed in scope and RESTful in nature. The progress of tasks takes place as application states are being transitioned to the next through hypermedia. The model of web tasking complies with the application constraint of “Hypermedia as the Engine of Application State” (HATEOAS).

Web tasking are users' interactions upon web resources that are typically distributed in nature for the purpose of performance of tasks. Actors of Interactions in web tasking can be a web user or a machine acting on behalf of web users. Web tasking execution complies with the RESTful principled design of the web architecture, and therefore can be executed across distributed domains of the Web.

Other aspects of Web Tasking has been established:

- Context, Situation Awareness and web tasking

University of Victoria contribution of Context to Web Tasking

- Task simplification in web tasking

Castaneda, L.; Muller, H. A.; Villegas, N. M. (2013). "Towards Personalized Web-Tasking: Task Simplification Challenges". 2013 IEEE Ninth World Congress on Services. pp. 147–153. doi:10.1109/SERVICES.2013.61. ISBN 978-0-7695-5024-4.

- Self adaptation in web tasking

Castaneda, L.; Muller, H. A.; Villegas, N. M. (2014). "Self-adaptive applications: On the development of personalized web-tasking systems". Proceedings of the 9th International Symposium on Software Engineering for Adaptive and Self-Managing Systems - SEAMS 2014. pp. 49–54. doi:10.1145/2593929.2593942. ISBN 9781450328647.

- Enabling Social Networking Services for Web Tasking

Ng, Joanna W.; Lau, Diana H. (2013). "Social Ontology and Semantic Actions: Enabling Social Networking Services for Distributed Web Tasking". 2013 IEEE Ninth World Congress on Services. pp. 131–135. doi:10.1109/SERVICES.2013.23. ISBN 978-0-7695-5024-4.
