= Resource (disambiguation) =

A resource is a source or supply from which benefit is produced, typically but not necessarily of limited availability.

Resource may also refer to:

- Natural resource, anything obtained from the environment to satisfy human needs and wants
  - Water resources, sources of water that are useful or potentially useful
- Resource (biology), substances or objects required by a biological organism for normal maintenance, growth, and reproduction
- Resource (economics), commodity, service, or other asset used in production of goods and services, including
  - Human resources (HR), skills, energies, talents, abilities, and knowledge used for production
  - Resource (project management), economic resources used in planning of tasks
- System resource (computing), anything of limited availability to a computer
  - Computational resource, resource used for solving a computational problem
  - Web resource, anything identified by a Uniform Resource Identifier which can be found in a certain location
  - Resource fork, data associated with a Mac OS file
  - Resource (Windows), data embedded in EXE and DLL files
  - Resource (Java), application data
- Resource (band), a former German electronic dance group
