= Fantom (programming language) =

- Paradigm: multi-paradigm: object-oriented, actor, functional
- Developers: Brian Frank, Andy Frank
- First appeared: 2005; 21 years ago
- Stable release: 1.0.81 / December 6, 2024; 20 months ago
- Typing discipline: static, dynamic
- Platform: x86-64, Java
- OS: Windows, Unix-like: Linux, macOS
- License: Academic Free version 3.0
- Filename extensions: .fan, .fwt, .pod
- Website: www.fantom.org

Influenced by
- C#, Java, Scala, Ruby, Erlang

Fantom, formerly Fan, is a general-purpose object-oriented programming language, created by Brian Frank and Andy Frank. It runs on the Java Runtime Environment (JRE), JavaScript, and the .NET Common Language Runtime (CLR) (.NET support is considered "prototype" status). Its stated goal is to provide a standard library application programming interface (API). Fantom uses a curly brace syntax, supports functional programming through closures and concurrency through the actor model, and blends aspects of both static and dynamic typing.

The original name of the Fantom programming language was Fan, named after the Fan District neighborhood in which the creators live in Richmond, Virginia. In November 2009, the name of the project was officially changed from Fan to Fantom due to searchability concerns raised by its community.

Fantom is free and open-source software under Academic Free License 3.0 and is available for operating systems including Windows and Unix-like: Linux, macOS.

== Features and systems ==
All variables in Fantom are statically typed, as it has no generic types, but it has a set of built-in generic types: List, Map, and Func. Fantom also supports dynamic calls and automatic downcasting. Fantom has a reflective programming (reflection) API and metaprogramming abilities.

Fantom supports imports of Java classes and modules with some limitations. Its integer is 64-bit. Unlike Java and C#, Fantom has no long or short integer types, and it supports no tuples.

In Fantom, the unit of deployment is called a pod. Pods take on the role of namespaces, packages, and modules. They are stored as .pod files, which are ZIP files containing the FCode (the Fantom bytecode), the documentation, and resource files necessary to run the pod. The Fantom build system can package a set of pods into a JAR archive through build::JarDist.

== Integrated development environment ==
F4 is the main publicly available integrated development environment (IDE) for the Fantom language, officially supported by one of the main open-source contributors to the language, Steve Eynon. The F4 IDE is available on GitHub.

== Fantom Widget Toolkit ==
Fantom ships with a standard windowing toolkit called the Fantom Widget Toolkit, or FWT for short. FWT was designed to be portable across several platforms. It is implemented on the Java virtual machine (JVM) using the Standard Widget Toolkit as a backend. The JavaScript implementation is backed by the canvas element and JavaFX, allowing FWT applications to be run in a web browser. There are plans for a CLR implementation using Windows Forms.

== Use ==
Escape the Mainframe is a browser game (just like the Google t-rex dinosaur) completely written in Fantom by Steve Eynon.

== See also ==
- Boo (programming language)
- Ceylon (programming language)
- Gosu (programming language)
- Apache Groovy
- Kotlin
- Ruby (programming language)
