= Charles Ibry =

French railway engineer (1819–1883)

Charles (Stéphane Ernest) Ybry
- Born: 1819; Paris
- Died: 10 April 1883 (aged 63–64); Neuilly
- Engineering career
- Discipline: Railway engineer

Charles Ibry (1819-1883) was a French railway engineer who invented a timetable chart in the 1840s for planning train schedules for efficiency and safety on the Paris to Le Havre line.

== Life and politics ==
He was married to Clotilde Delbar, great-grandparents of Emmanuelle de Dampierre. From 1860 to 1870, he was councilmember and from 1868 to 1870 mayor in Neuilly. In 1882, a villa was constructed for him in Dinard.

== Ibry chart ==
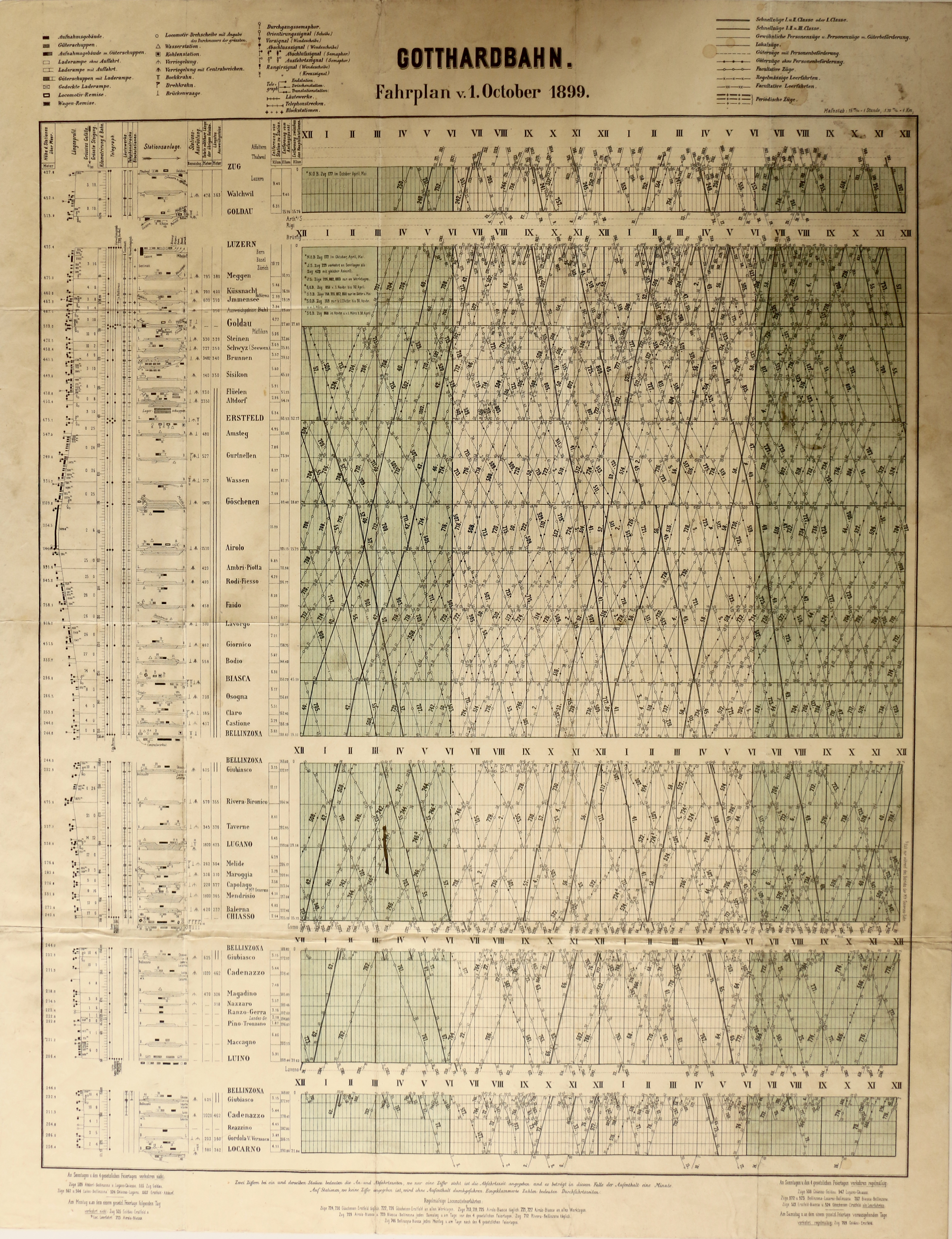
An example of an Ibry chart: Timetable of Gotthard railway in 1899

In the first half of the 1800s, the early days of train operation, little thought was given to punctuality and train safety, and many accidents occurred, often deadly. Also, extending the lax schedule of stagecoach timetabling, trains were often late or early, complicating the task of keeping trains apart on the same section of track.

Ibry developed a time–distance diagram and ruler to determine train plans and keep trains apart. It shows distance (with train stations) on the vertical axis, and time of day on the horizontal axis. Each train is given a diagonal line going from start to destination. If two lines intersect, it means two trains are at the same position at the same time, and one or both must be rescheduled — in some cases trains are paused at stations or sidings. Ibry's chart influenced rail planning ever since, starting in France. It is also known as a line grid, string chart, or commonly referred to as a Marey chart due to its popularization by Étienne-Jules Marey..
