= Resource-oriented architecture =

Architectural pattern in software design

In software engineering, a resource-oriented architecture (ROA) is a style of software architecture and programming paradigm for supportive designing and developing software in the form of Internetworking of resources with "RESTful" interfaces. These resources are software components (discrete pieces of code and/or data structures) which can be reused for different purposes. ROA design principles and guidelines are used during the phases of software development and system integration.

REST, or Representational State Transfer, describes a series of architectural constraints that exemplify how the web's design emerged. Various concrete implementations of these ideas have been created throughout time, but it has been difficult to discuss the REST architectural style without blurring the lines between actual software and the architectural principles behind it.

In Chapter 5 of his thesis, Roy Fielding documents how the World Wide Web is designed to be constrained by the REST series of limitations. These are still fairly abstract and have been interpreted in various ways in designing new frameworks, systems, and websites. In the past, heated exchanges have been made about whether RPC-style REST architectures are RESTful.

== Guidelines for clarification ==
The Resource Oriented Architecture, as documented by Leonard Richardson and Sam Ruby in their 2007 book RESTful Web Services, gives concrete advice on specific technical details. Naming these collections of guidelines "Resource Oriented Architecture" may allow developers to discuss the benefits of an architecture in the context of ROA.

Some guidelines are already common within the larger REST communities such as: that an application should expose many URIs, one for each resource; and that processing cookies representing IDs in a server-side session is not Restful

== Existing frameworks ==
Richardson and Ruby also discuss many software frameworks that provide some or many features of the ROA. These include /db, Django, TurboGears, Flask, EverRest, JBoss RESTEasy, JBoss Seam, Spring, Apache Wink, Jersey, NetKernel, Recess, Ruby on Rails, Symfony, Yii2, Play Framework, and API Platform.

== Web infrastructure ==
While REST is a set of architectural guidelines applicable to various types of computing infrastructures, Resource Oriented Architecture (ROA) is only coupled with the web. This architecture is therefore useful mostly to businesses that consider the web as the computing/publishing platform of choice.

The power of the web seems to mostly reside in its ability to lower the barriers to entry for human users who may not be highly trained in using computing machinery. As such, the web widens the market reach for any business that decides to publish some of its content in electronic format. On the web, such published content is regarded as a web resource.

== Bibliography ==
- Richardson, Leonard; Ruby, Sam (May 2007). RESTful Web Services. O'Reilly Media. ISBN 978-0-596-52926-0.
- Lucchi, R.; Millot, M.; Elfers, C. (2008). Resource Oriented Architecture and REST (PDF). Scientific and Technical Research. Luxembourg: Office for Official Publications of the European Communities. doi:10.2788/80035. ISBN 978-92-79-09320-3. ISSN 1018-5593.
