= NKP =

NKP may refer to:

- The abbreviation and identifying marks of the Nickel Plate Road
- NetKernel Protocol
- New Korea Party, a political party in South Korea
- New Komeito Party, a Japanese political party
- New York, Chicago and St. Louis Railroad, the Nickel Plate Road
- Communist Party of Norway (Norges Kommunistiske Parti)
- Nakhon Phanom Royal Thai Air Force Base, which was used by the United States Pacific Air Forces during the Vietnam War
- Nitrogen, Potassium, and Phosphorus, three essential plant nutrients.
