= Limited resources =

Limited resources may refer to:

- Non-renewable resources
- Scarcity
- Embedded systems, computing devices resource availability
- Poverty
