= Movie map =

Movie map may refer to:

- A guide to filming locations and/or settings for a particular movie.
- An interactive computer video representation of a particular building, site, or town, which allows a virtual tour of the location (see Aspen Movie Map).
