= WADL =

WADL may refer to:

- WADL (TV), a television station (channel 27, virtual 38) licensed to serve Mount Clemens, Michigan, United States
- Web Application Description Language, an XML-based file format
- Lombok International Airport (ICAO code "WADL") in Lombok, Indonesia
