= Amanda Goodenough =

American digital storyteller

Amanda Goodenough is a children's storyteller known for creating one of the first interactive digital stories in 1987.

Goodenough's husband, Bob Goodenough, was a consultant who worked with Bill Atkinson. Atkinson gave Bob a copy of Wildcard, the beta version of HyperCard. Bob was later said to be on the original HyperCard team (though this may be because his name appears on HyperCard's credits page). Amanda used the software to create an interactive story geared towards children where the user could guide the path of the story. Her first story was called Inigo Gets Out about a cat exploring the outdoors. She released that and a follow-up story as shareware, winning an award for the stories from the Boston Computer Society. Goodenough applied for a trademark on Inigo in 1988.

Goodenough met Bob Stein at MacWorld Expo where she was giving a presentation called "A Friendly Guide to HyperCard" and showed him her work. Stein worked for Voyager Company and released AmandaStories with the Inigo stories in 1991 on floppy disk. The next set of AmandaStories came out on CD-ROM and included stories about a camel called Your Faithful Camel as well as color versions of some of the original tales. It was the first set of Hypercard decks the company had published.

Goodenough was inspired by her grandmother's storytelling which would include asking the listener what they thought would happen next, instigating interactive storytelling. Her own story of being "a thoroughly non-technical housewife who was able to create something remarkable" made her well-known in the Macintosh world. She also illustrated at least one other non-HyperCard game. Goodenough's work won the 1st Annual HyperChat Award from MacTech magazine in 1989. Her stories were mentioned in the documentary film Hyperland where she presented Inigo Gets Out which she created in 1987.
