= Sequence step algorithm =

Computer Algorithm

A sequence step algorithm (SQS-AL) is an algorithm implemented in a discrete event simulation system to maximize resource utilization. This is achieved by running through two main nested loops: A sequence step loop and a replication loop. For each sequence step, each replication loop is a simulation run that collects crew idle time for activities in that sequence step. The collected crew idle times are then used to determine resource arrival dates for user-specified confidence levels. The process of collecting the crew idle times and determining crew arrival times for activities on a considered sequence step is repeated from the first to the last sequence step.

== See also ==
- Computational resource
- Linear scheduling method
