= Michael Naimark =

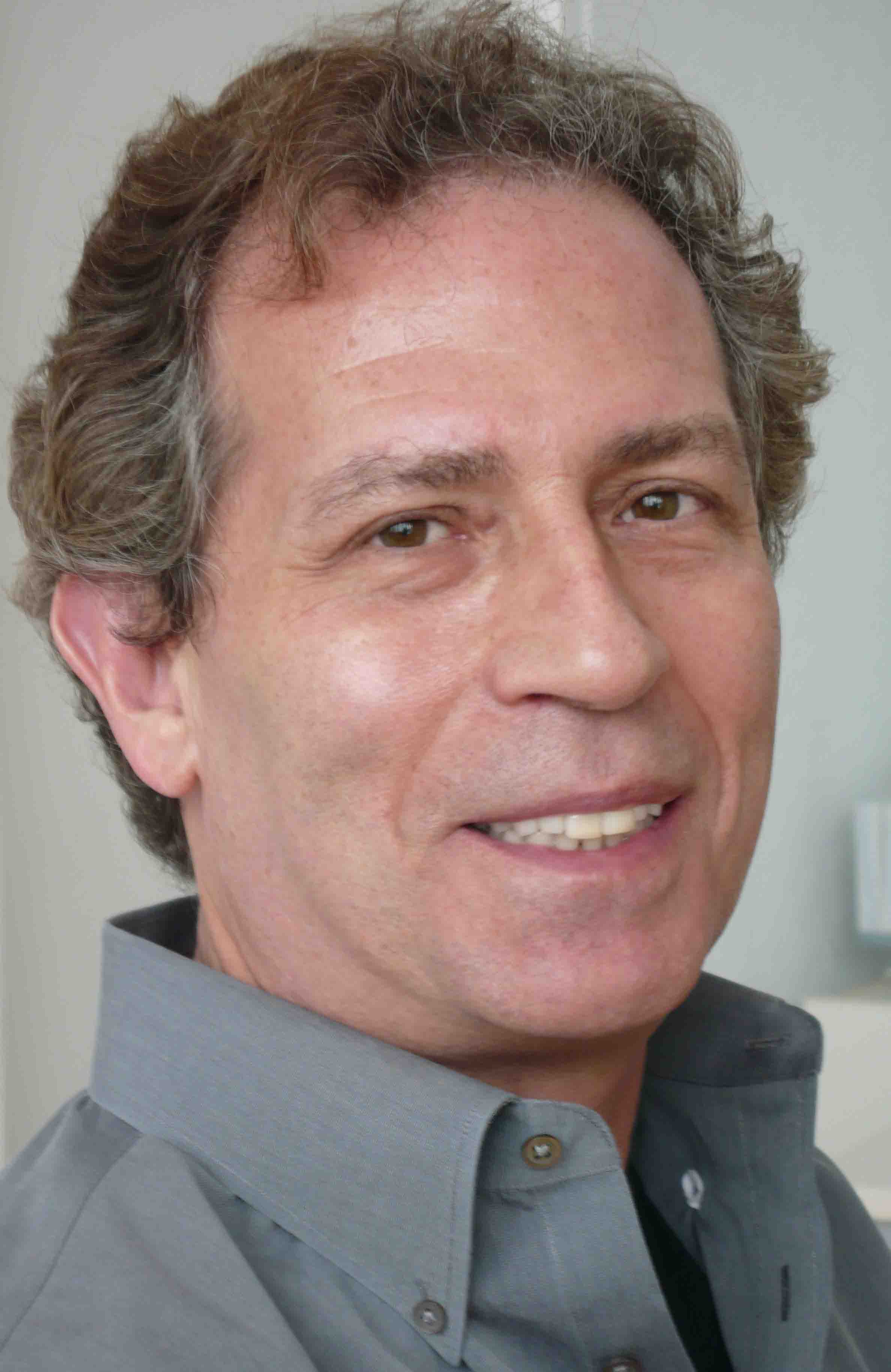
Michael Naimark, NYC, Feb 2010

Michael Naimark is an artist, inventor, and scholar in the fields of virtual reality and new media art. He is best known for his work in projection mapping, virtual travel, live global video, and cultural preservation, and often refers to this body of work as “place representation”.

He has been awarded 16 patents relating to cameras, display, haptics, and live, and his work has been seen in over 300 art exhibitions, film festivals, and presentations around the world. He was the 2002 recipient of the World Technology Award for the Arts.

Since 2009, he has served as faculty at NYU’s Interactive Telecommunications Program, USC’s School of Cinematic Arts, and the MIT Media Lab.

In 2015, he was appointed Google’s first-ever “VR resident artist” in their new VR division.

He works as an independent producer and consultant out of Francis Coppola's Zoetrope building in downtown San Francisco.

In Fall 2017, he accepted an appointment as Visiting Associate Arts Professor at NYU Shanghai, where he teaches VR/AR Fundamentals and directs research on online telepresence both large and small.

== Research and artwork ==
He helped found a number of prominent research labs, including Atari Research Lab (1982), MIT Media Laboratory (1985), Apple Multimedia Lab (1987), Lucasfilm Interactive (1989), and Interval Research Corporation (1992). At MIT, he helped put together the Aspen Movie Map, the predecessor to Google Street View, and was a long-time advisor to ethnomusicologist Alan Lomax’s Global Jukebox Project.

His artwork is included in the permanent collections of the American Museum of the Moving Image in New York, the Exploratorium in San Francisco, and the ZKM | Center for Arts and Media in Karlsruhe, Germany. His large-scale installations include projected living rooms spray painted white and stereo-panoramic rooms with rotating floors.
