= NetKernel =

- Original author: HP Laboratories
- Developer: 1060 Research
- Stable release: 6.2.1 / 27 January 2018; 8 years ago
- Written in: Java
- Type: Application framework
- License: 1060 Public License
- Website: www.1060research.com/products/

NetKernel is a British software company and software platform by the same name that is used for High Performance Computing, Enterprise Application Integration, and Energy Efficient Computation.

It allows developers to cleanly separate code from architecture. It can be used as an application server, embedded in a Java container or employed as a cloud computing platform.

As a platform, it is an implementation of the resource-oriented computing (ROC) abstraction. ROC is a logical computing model that resides on top of but is completely isolated from the physical realm of code and objects. In ROC, information and services are identified by logical addresses which are resolved to physical endpoints for the duration of a request and then released. Logical indirect addressing results in flexible systems that can be changed while the system is in operation. In NetKernel, the boundary between the logical and physical layers is intermediated by an operation-system caliber microkernel that can perform various transparent optimization.

The idea of using resources to model abstract information stems from the REST architectural style and the World Wide Web. The idea of using a uniform addressing model stems from the Unix operating system. NetKernel can be considered a unification of the Web and Unix implemented as a software operating system running on a monolithic microkernel within a single computer.

NetKernel was developed by 1060 Research and is offered under a dual open-source software and commercial software license.

== History ==
NetKernel was started at Hewlett-Packard Labs in 1999. It was conceived by Dr. Russ Perry, Dr. Royston Sellman and Dr. Peter Rodgers as a general purpose XML operating environment that could address the needs of the exploding interest in XML dialects for intra-industry XML messaging.

Rodgers saw the web as an implementation of a general abstraction which he extrapolated as ROC, but whereas the web is limited to publishing information; he set about conceiving a solution that could perform computation using similar principles. Working in close partnership with co-founder Tony Butterfield, they discovered a method for writing software that could be executed across a logical model, separated from the physical realm of code and objects. Recognising the potential for this approach, they spun out of HP Labs.

Rodgers and Butterfield begun their company as "1060 Research Limited" in Chipping Sodbury, a small market town on the edge of the Cotsolds region of England in 2002, and over a number of years developed the platform that became NetKernel.

In early 2018, 1060 Research announced that it was appointing a new CEO, Charles Radclyffe. Radclyffe announced to the NetKernel community in February 2018 that the team were working on a new platform based on NKEE 6 which would be fully hosted, programmable and accessible via the web - NetKernel Cloud. Radclyffe resigned after six months.

== Concepts ==
=== Resource ===
A resource is identifiable information within a computer system. Resources are an abstract notion and they cannot be manipulated directly. When a resource is requested, a concrete, immutable representation is provided which captures the current state of the resource. This is directly analogous to the way the World Wide Web functions. On the Web, a URL address identifies a globally accessible resource. When a browser issues a request for the resource it is sent a representation of the resource in the response.

=== Addresses ===
A resource is identified by an address within an address space. In NetKernel, Uniform Resource Identifier (URI) addresses are used to identify all resources. Unlike the Web, which has a single global address space, NetKernel supports an unlimited number of address spaces and supports relationships between address spaces.

NetKernel supports a variety of URI schemes and introduces new ones specifically applicable to URI addressing within a software system.

=== Request ===
The fundamental operation in NetKernel is a resource request, or request. A request consists of a resource URI address and a verb. Supported verbs include SOURCE, SINK, NEW, DELETE, EXISTS and META. Each request is dispatched to a microkernel which resolves the URI address to a physical endpoint and assigns and schedules a thread for processing. When the endpoint completes processing the microkernel returns the response to the initiating client.

== Programming ==
The fundamental instruction in NetKernel is a resource request, specified by a URI. Mechanisms that sequence URI requests are located above the microkernel. In the current Java-based implementation, requests are dispatched using a Java API. This implies that any language that can call a Java API can be used to program NetKernel.

As of April 2013, the set of languages supported includes:

- Java
- Ruby
- Scala
- Clojure
- JavaScript
- Python 2
- Groovy
- Beanshell
- PHP
- DPML
- XML related languages such as XQuery
- The URI specification itself has sufficient richness to express a functional programming language.

=== Active URI Scheme ===
The active URI scheme was proposed by Hewlett-Packard as a means to encode a functional program within a URI.

active: {function-name} [+ {parameter-name} @ {parameter-value-URI}]*

For example, the following URI calls a random number generator

active:random

and the following uses an XSLT service to transform an XML document with an XSLT stylesheet:

active:xslt+operator@file:/style.xsl+operand@file:/document.xml

Because the argument values may be URI addresses themselves, a tree-structured set of function calls can be encoded in a single URI.

=== Transports ===
Transports are a mechanism used to introduce requests from outside of NetKernel to the NetKernel address space. Transports are available for the HTTP protocol, JMS (Java Message Service), and CRON. Other transports can be easily added as they are independent from the rest of NetKernel.

The role of the transport is to translate an external request based on one protocol into a NetKernel request with a URI and a specific verb (SOURCE, SINK, etc.) and then to send the returned representation back to the client via the supported protocol.

Two mappings are handled by a transport. The first is between the address space of the externally supported protocol to the internal NetKernel address space. And the second is between the verb or action specified externally into a NetKernel verb.

For example, in the case of the HTTP transport, the external address space is a sub-space of a URL. The following mapping illustrates this point.

http://www.mywebsite.com/publications/...
       
             |
             v

file:/src/publications/...

In addition, the HTTP protocol supports methods such as GET, PUT, HEAD, etc. which are mapped to NetKernel verbs.

=== Scripting languages ===
A mechanism is needed to issue the URI requests, capture the returned representations, and communicate with clients.

Scripting languages are executed by their runtime engine, which is itself a service. For example, the Groovy language runtime will run a program contained in the file file:/program.gy with the following:

active:groovy+operator@file:/program.gy

== See also ==
- Representational State Transfer
- Web resource
- Jolie
- List of user interface markup languages
