= Resource (Java) =

In the Java programming language a resource is a piece of data that can be accessed by the code of an application.

An application can access its resources through uniform resource locators, like web resources, but the resources are usually contained within the JAR file(s) of the application. Also the Java resources can be contained within the APK file(s).

A resource bundle is a set of key and value pairs, stored as a resource, that is commonly used to allow the localization of an application. For this purpose different resource bundles with a common set of keys are used to store translations for the messages and user interface texts of an application.
