= Linear scheduling method =

Project scheduling method for repetitive activities

Linear scheduling method (LSM) is a graphical scheduling method focusing on continuous resource utilization in repetitive activities.

== Application ==
LSM is used mainly in the construction industry to schedule resources in repetitive activities commonly found in highway, pipeline, high-rise building and rail construction projects. These projects are called repetitive or linear projects. The main advantages of LSM over critical path method (CPM) is its underlying idea of keeping resources continuously at work. In other words, it schedules activities in such a way that:

1. resource utilization is maximized;
2. interruption in on-going process is minimized, including hiring-and-firing; and
3. the effect of the learning curve phenomenon is maximized

== Alternative names ==
Specific names for the linear scheduling method have been adopted, such as:

- Location-based scheduling (the preferred term in the book)
- Harmonograms
- Line-of-balance
- Flowline or flow line
- Repetitive scheduling method
- Vertical production method
- Time-location matrix model
- Time space scheduling method
- Disturbance scheduling
- Horizontal and vertical logic scheduling for multistory projects
- Horizontal and vertical scheduling
- Multiple repetitive construction process
- Representing construction
- Linear scheduling
- Time versus distance diagrams (T-D charts)
- Time chainage
- Linear balance charts
- Velocity diagrams

== See also ==
- List of project management software
- List of project management topics
- Project management
- Project planning
- Sequence step algorithm
- Time distance diagram
- Work breakdown structure
