= Kristina Hooper Woolsey =

American cognitive scientist

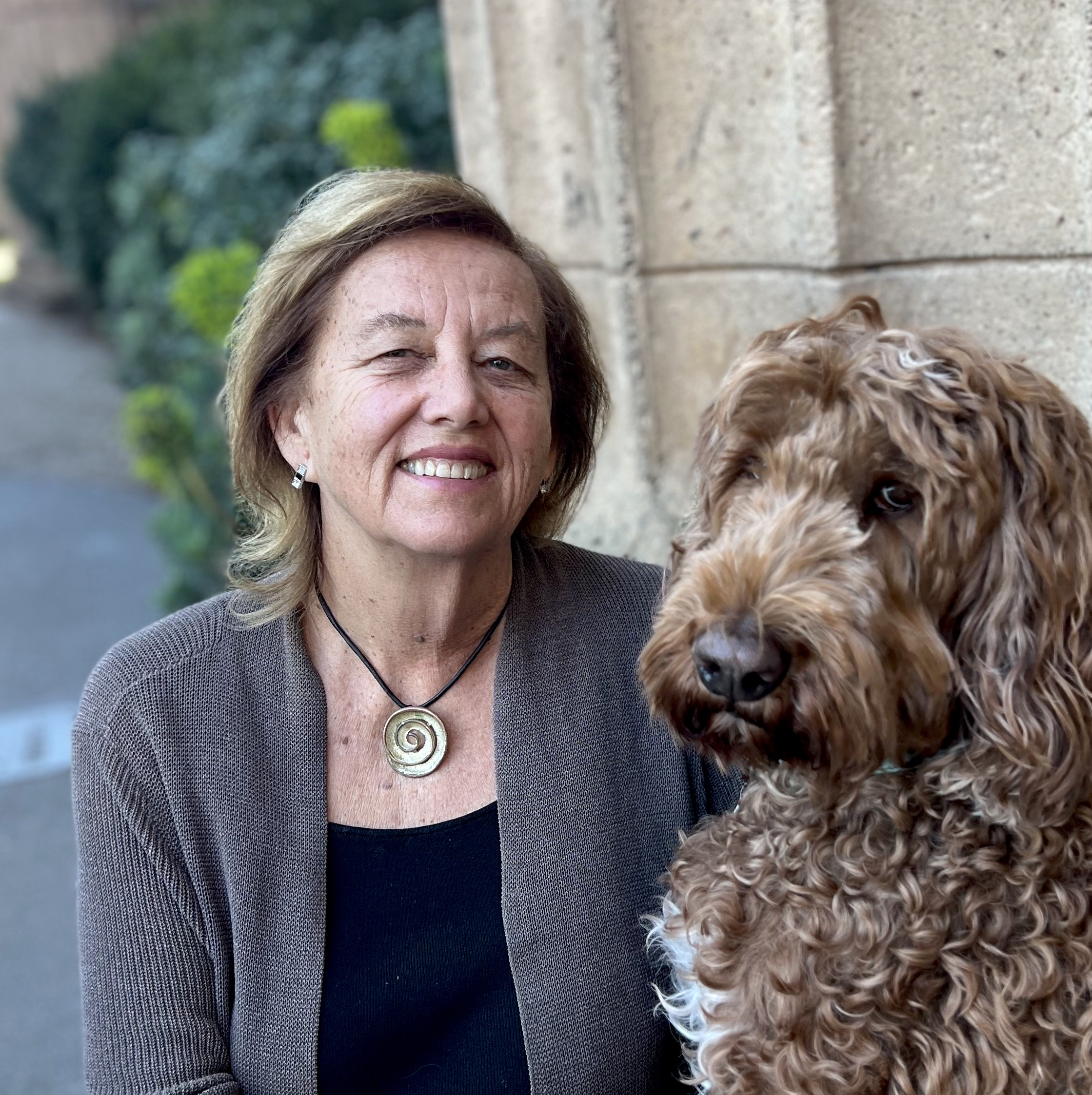
Dr. Kristina Hooper Woolsey with her dog

Dr. Kristina Hooper Woolsey is an American scholar and cognitive scientist known as the "mother of multimedia" for her pioneering work at the Apple Multimedia Lab and Atari Research Labs, which she directed. Woolsey was a founding member of the Apple Human Interface Group.

== Career ==
=== Academic and non-profit roles ===
As a postdoctoral fellow in architecture in the 1970s, she explored the connections between "movies", e.g. film and video, and physical spaces. As an assistant professor at the University of California, Santa Cruz she explored geographic information systems, working on the Aspen Movie Map as a visiting faculty member at MIT. Woolsey also serves as Adjunct Faculty in the Department of Cognitive Science at Case Western Reserve University. She was Director of the Marin Learning Conservancy and served as president of the Ross School Board of Trustees. She was also a member of the Advisory Council for the New Orleans Center for Creative Arts. In 2009 Woolsey was the Project Director for a Capital Project at the San Francisco Exploratorium to relocate this science museum to the San Francisco Embarcadero. She was also a member of the Emeritus Board of the New Media Consortium, an organization she has worked with since its inception, and Head of the Advisory Board for the Learning, Design and Technology Program at Stanford University.

=== Producer roles ===
She has served as executive producer of a range of critically acclaimed multimedia titles, including Life Story, the Visual Almanac, and Voices of the Thirties.

=== Writing ===
Woolsey is author of many articles, chapters, and books, including VizAbility, from Ceengage Publishers, which she coauthored with Scott Kim and Gayle Curtis. She served as co-editor with Sueann Ambron for Learning with Interactive Multimedia from Microsoft Press. She summarized the research and development at the Apple Multimedia Lab with her book Learn Different: Designing multimedia at Apple 1987-1992.

== Recognition and awards ==
She was named a Distinguished Scientist by Apple Computer in acknowledgment of her pioneering work in multimedia in education, and an NMC Fellow by the New Media Consortium for her lifetime of contributions to the field.
