= EHLLAPI =

1986 communication software by IBM

Emulator High-level Language Application Program Interface (EHLLAPI) is an enhanced version of HLLAPI. It was introduced in 1986 by IBM in association with the IBM 3270 PC to provide access from a DOS PC environment to data on an IBM mainframe.

EHLLAPI can be used to determine screen characters, track and send keystrokes, check the host status and perform file transfers. Typically this API was employed for communication with existing mainframe applications without the need to modify the application code. EHLLAPI could map a screen between different IBM 3270 legacy applications, allowing information to be transferred between the two. It was often used for automated control of applications via keystroke input and screen scraping.

This IBM standard is supported by most terminal emulators.

== See also ==
- 3270 emulator
