= Resource-oriented computing =

Architectural pattern in software design

Resource-oriented computing (ROC) is a simple abstract computing model used for describing, designing, and implementing software and software systems. The fundamental idea behind ROC is derived from the World Wide Web, Unix, and other sources as well as original research conducted at HP Laboratories.

== Fundamental concepts ==
Resource-oriented computing describes an abstract computing model. The fundamental idea is that sets of information known as resources are treated as abstracts; that is, a resource is a Platonic concept of the information that is the subject of a computation process.

Resources are identified by logical addresses (typically a URI) and processing is defined using compositions and sequences of resource requests.

At the physical level, a ROC system processes resource-representations, executes transformations and, in so doing, computes new resources. In this respect ROC is no different from any other computational model – computation is performed to collate and reveal new information.

The fundamental principles of ROC include:

Resource
A resource is an abstract set of information.
Identity
Each resource may be identified by one or more logical identifiers.
Resolution
A logical identifier may be resolved within an information-context to obtain a physical resource-representation.
Computation
Computation is the reification of a resource to a physical resource-representation.
Immutability
Resource representations are immutable.
Transreption
Transreption (short for transrepresentation) is the isomorphic lossless transformation of one physical resource-representation to another.

== See also ==
- Microservices
- NetKernel
