= Hypermedia =

Type of electronic literature

Hypermedia, an extension of hypertext, is a nonlinear medium of information that includes graphics, audio, video, plain text, and hyperlinks. This designation contrasts with the broader term multimedia, which may include non-interactive linear presentations as well as hypermedia. The term was first used in a 1965 article written by Ted Nelson. Hypermedia is a type of multimedia that features interactive elements, such as hypertext, buttons, or interactive images and videos, allowing users to navigate and engage with content in a non-linear manner.

The World Wide Web is a classic example of hypermedia to access web content, whereas a conventional cinema presentation is an example of standard multimedia, due to its inherent linearity and lack of interactivity via hyperlinks.

The first hypermedia work was, arguably, the Aspen Movie Map. Bill Atkinson's HyperCard popularized hypermedia writing, while a variety of literary hypertext and non-fiction hypertext works (electronic literature), demonstrated the promise of hyperlinks. Most modern hypermedia is delivered via electronic pages from a variety of systems including media players, web browsers, and stand-alone applications (i.e., software that does not require network access). Audio hypermedia is emerging with voice command devices and voice browsing.

== Development tools ==
Hypermedia may be developed in a number of ways. Any programming tool can be used to write programs that link data from internal variables and nodes for external data files. Multimedia development software such as Adobe Flash, Adobe Director, Macromedia Authorware, and MatchWare Mediator may be used to create stand-alone hypermedia applications, with emphasis on entertainment content. Some database software, such as Visual FoxPro and FileMaker Developer, may be used to develop stand-alone hypermedia applications, with emphasis on educational and business content management.

Hypermedia applications may be developed on embedded devices for the mobile and the digital signage industries using the Scalable Vector Graphics (SVG) specification from W3C (World Wide Web Consortium). Software applications, such as Ikivo Animator and Inkscape, simplify the development of hypermedia content based on SVG. Embedded devices, such as the iPhone, natively support SVG specifications and may be used to create mobile and distributed hypermedia applications.

Hyperlinks may also be added to data files using most business software via the limited scripting and hyperlinking features built in. Documentation software, such as the Microsoft Office Suite and LibreOffice, allow for hypertext links to other content within the same file, other external files, and URL links to files on external file servers. For more emphasis on graphics and page layout, hyperlinks may be added using most modern desktop publishing tools. This includes presentation programs, such as Microsoft PowerPoint and LibreOffice Impress, add-ons to print layout programs such as Quark Immedia, and tools to include hyperlinks in PDF documents such as Adobe InDesign for creating and Adobe Acrobat for editing. Hyper Publish is a tool specifically designed and optimized for hypermedia and hypertext management. Any HTML editor may be used to build HTML files, accessible by any web browser. CD/DVD authoring tools, such as DVD Studio Pro, may be used to hyperlink the content of DVDs for DVD players or web links when the disc is played on a personal computer connected to the internet.

== Learning ==
There have been a number of theories concerning hypermedia and learning. One important claim in the literature on hypermedia and learning is that it offers more control over the instructional environment for the reader or student. Another claim is that it levels the playing field among students of varying abilities and enhances collaborative learning. A claim from psychology includes the notion that hypermedia more closely models the structure of the brain, in comparison with printed text.

== Application programming interfaces ==
Hypermedia is used as a medium and constraint in certain application programming interfaces. HATEOAS, Hypermedia as the Engine of Application State, is a constraint of the REST application architecture where a client interacts with the server entirely through hypermedia provided dynamically by application servers. This means that in theory no API documentation is needed, because the client needs no prior knowledge about how to interact with any particular application or server beyond a generic understanding of hypermedia. In other service-oriented architectures (SOA), clients and servers interact through a fixed interface shared through documentation or an interface description language (IDL).

== See also ==
- Cybertext
- Electronic literature
- Hyperland is a 1990 documentary film that focuses on Douglas Adams and explains adaptive hypertext and hypermedia.
- Metamedia
