= Apple Multimedia Lab =

American Mass Media Company

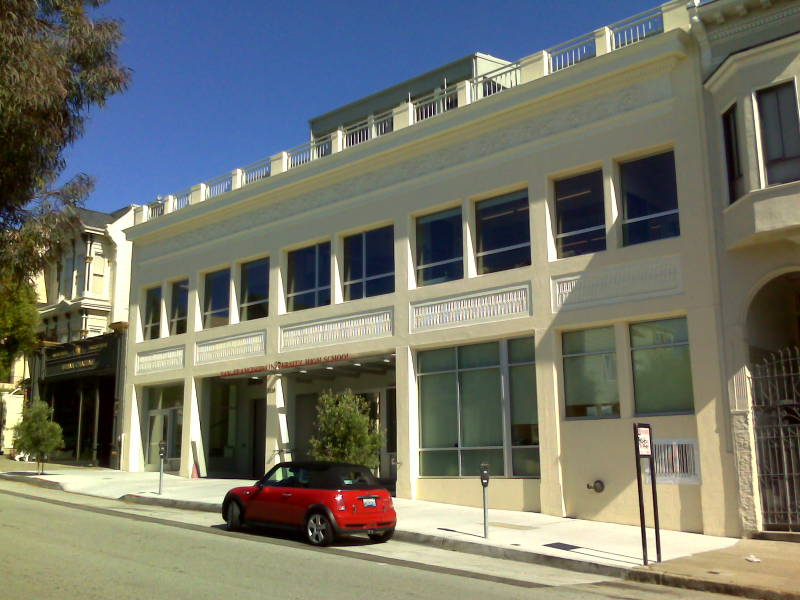
- 3220 Sacramento St., San Francisco
- Founded: 1987
- Defunct: 1992
- Headquarters: San Francisco, California, USA
- Products: Interactive media research lab for educational software
- Parent: Apple Computer

The Apple Multimedia Lab was a pioneering electronic media research group operated by Apple Computer. It was founded in 1987 by cognitive psychologist Kristina Hooper Woolsey and educational psychologist Sueann Ambron.
