= Roy Fielding =

American computer scientist

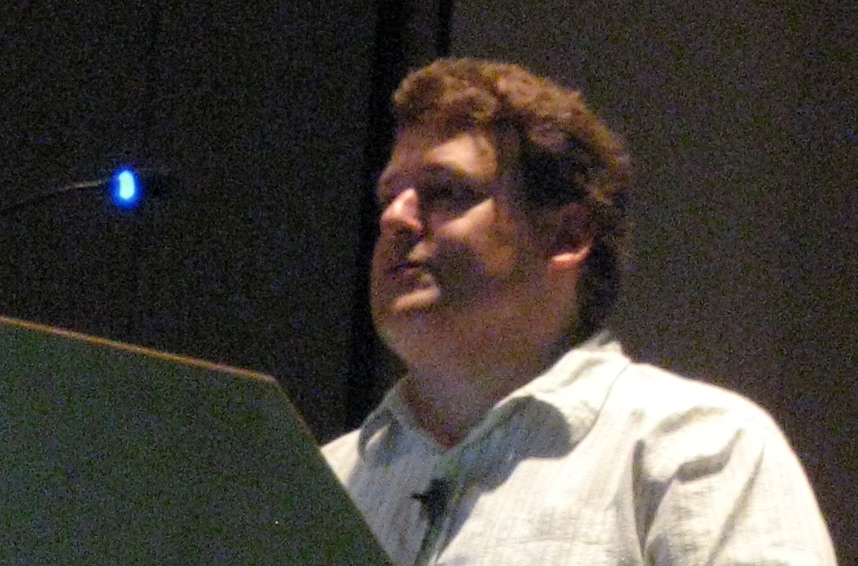
- Fielding speaking at OSCON08
- Born: Roy Thomas Fielding; September 1965 (age 61); Laguna Beach, California
- Education: University of California, Irvine
- Known for: REST, Apache HTTP Server
- Scientific career
- Fields: Computer science
- Thesis: Architectural Styles and the Design of Network-based Software Architectures (2000)
- Website: roy.gbiv.com

Roy Thomas Fielding (born 1965) is an American computer scientist, one of the principal authors of the HTTP specification and the originator of the representational state transfer (REST) architectural style. He is an authority on computer network architecture and co-founded the Apache HTTP Server project.

Fielding works as a senior principal scientist at Adobe in San Jose, California.

== Biography ==
Fielding was born in 1965 in Laguna Beach, California. He describes himself as "part Maori, Kiwi, Yank, Irish, Scottish, British, and California beach bum". In 1999, the Massachusetts Institute of Technology (MIT) Technology Review TR100 named him one of the top 100 innovators in the world under the age of 35. In 2000, he received his doctorate from the University of California, Irvine.

== Contributions ==
Architectural Styles and the Design of Network-based Software Architectures, Fielding's doctoral dissertation, describes Representational State Transfer (REST) as a key architectural principle of the World Wide Web and received a large amount of attention. Computer engineers frequently hold up REST as an approach to developing web services, as an alternative to other distributed-computing specifications such as SOAP. Fielding has also been heavily involved in the development of HTML and Uniform Resource Identifiers. Fielding co-founded the Apache HTTP Server project and was a member of the interim OpenSolaris Boards until he resigned from the community in 2008. He chaired the Apache Software Foundation for its first three years and sat on its board of directors until May 2014.

Between 2001 and 2006, Fielding worked on Waka, an application protocol intended as "a binary, token-based replacement for HTTP". It was "designed to match the efficiency of the REST architectural style".

He coined the term HATEOAS (Hypermedia As The Engine of Application State) in 2000 in his doctoral dissertation.

== Bibliography ==
- Fielding, Roy Thomas (2000). "Architectural Styles and the Design of Network-based Software Architectures". Dissertation. University of California, Irvine.
