= Intertwingularity =

Coined term by Ted Nelson in 1974

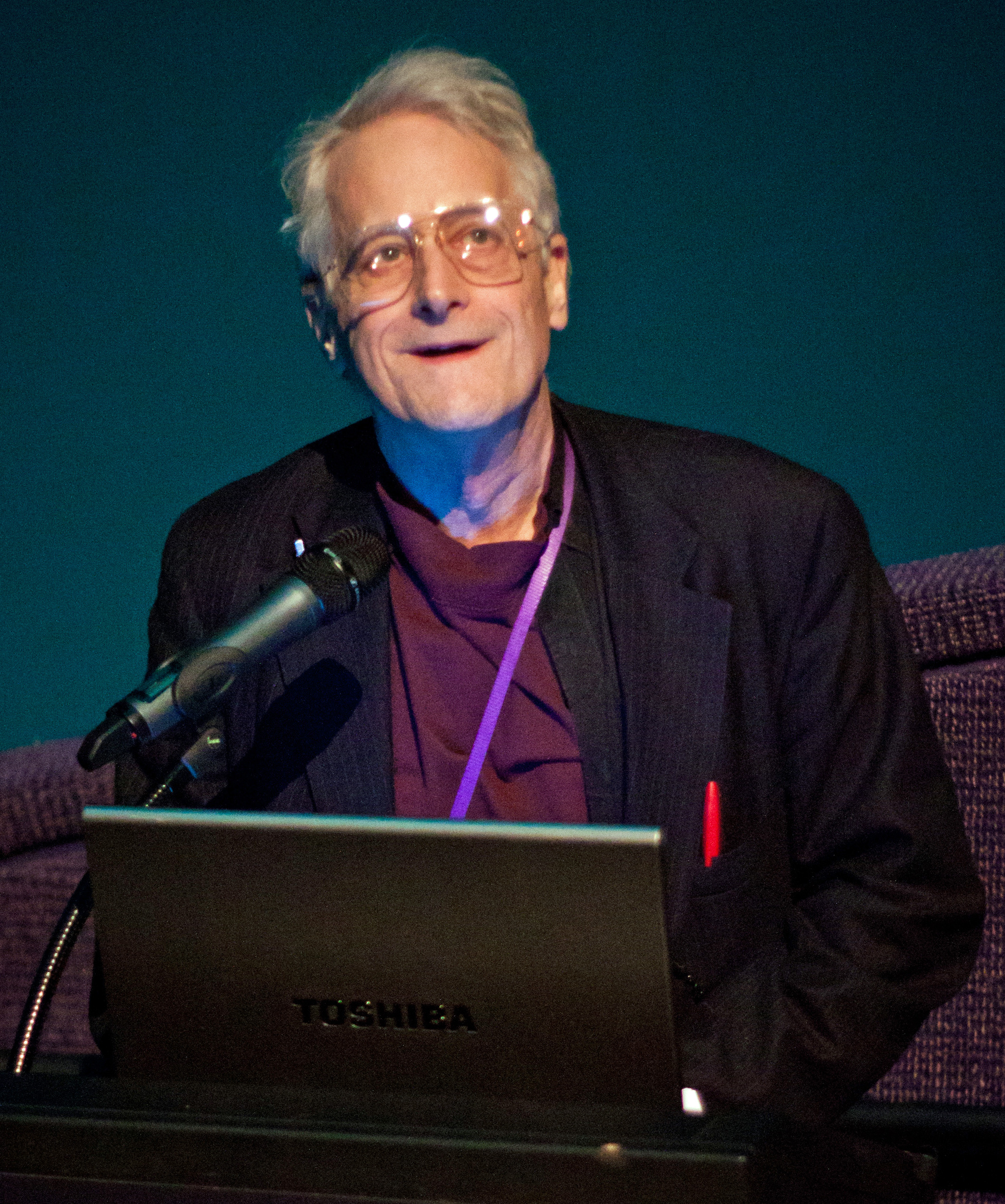
Ted Nelson, in 2011, giving a talk on Project Xanadu at The Tech Museum of Innovation

Intertwingularity is a portmanteau of the words intertwined and intermingled, coined by information-technology theorist Ted Nelson in 1974 to express the dense and interconnected relationships in human knowledge. The term is now commonly used to describe semantic systems of organization that are non-sequential, non-hierarchical, and which are antithetical to hierarchical systems. Nelson first introduced this term in Computer Lib/Dream Machines as part of his broader critique of existing hierarchical systems of organization in computers, and, historically, it is associated with his other work on hypertext and Project Xanadu in reimagining the linear organizational structures of computers with cross-connections.

== Origin and theory ==
Intertwingularity was introduced by Nelson as a way to describe his position on how all information is "intertwined" and "intermingled", first mentioned in Computer Lib/Dream Machines where he states how "everything is deeply intertwingled ... there are no "subjects" at all; there is only all knowledge, since the cross-connections among the myriad topics of this world simply cannot be divided up neatly." Nelson refers to intertwingularity by contrasting it with conventional forms of organization, such as hierarchical classification or sequential organization; he believes that the structural imposition of categories or hierarchy distorts the relations between the things being represented.

Intertwingularity is closely related to the memex as introduced in Vannevar Bush's essay "As We May Think", owing largely to the memex's influence on Nelson in his conceptualization of intertwingularity and Project Xanadu. The use of associative trails in memex was meant to emulate the mental processes of the human brain, similar to Nelson's theorization of intertwingularity and implementation in Project Xanadu.

=== Computer Lib/Dream Machines ===
In Computer Lib/Dream Machines, Nelson uses his belief in intertwingularity to justify his opposition to hierarchical organization in hypertext and computers, differing from the views of Douglas Engelbart and Gordon Pask. Nelson specifically identifies Gutenberg's invention of the printing press as the source of hierarchical structures of organization: "Hierarchical and sequential structures, especially popular since Gutenberg, are usually forced and artificial. Intertwingularity is not generally acknowledged—people keep pretending they can make things hierarchical, categorizable and sequential when they can't." The dos-à-dos structure of Computer Lib and Dream Machines is intended by Nelson to be a representation of intertwingularity.

=== Philosophy ===
Nelson connects Heraclitus' idea of the unity of opposites, or flux, to his thinking on intertwingularity, notably Heraclitus' metaphor of a flowing river. He positions this in contrast to Aristotle, whom he believes is in "support of hierarchy".

== Uses and implementations ==
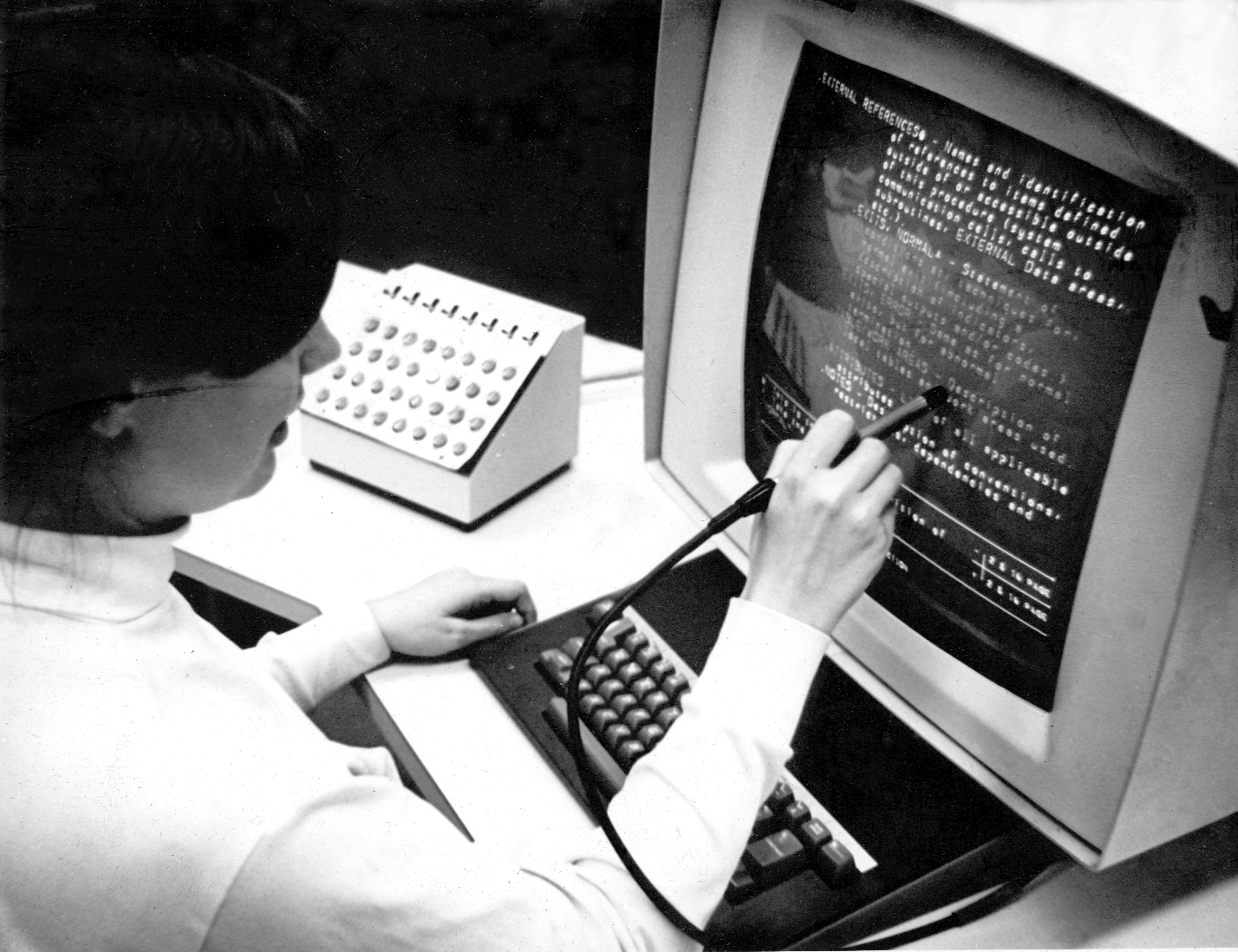
The Hypertext Editing System (HES) used with a light pen on an IBM 2250 in 1969

Nelson is generally credited with the invention of hypertext and was involved in the development of the Hypertext Editing System (HES) at Brown University with Andries van Dam, which was inspired in part by intertwingularity. Branching text and links in the HES were among the first implementations of user interaction with hypertext that allowed for the cross-connection and reorganization of different text, and also acted as a foundation for his hypertext work in Project Xanadu.

=== Project Xanadu ===
Project Xanadu was Ted Nelson's project to develop a full-scale infrastructure that preserves the intertwingled nature of knowledge in a hypertext system. Many envisioned mechanisms in Xanadu systems, including transclusion, intercomparison and tumblers, were designed to mirror intertwingled ways of organizing content and knowledge. Enfilade data structures, also invented by Nelson, were used to facilitate cross-connections between data through versioning and inheritance, allowing for the sharing of subtrees between multiple trees.

== Influence ==
=== Information systems and design ===
Intertwingularity is perceived to have anticipated developments in information design concerning the non-linearity of knowledge. Nelson's intertwingularity-inspired Project Xanadu attempted to address some of these concerns through persistent links, transclusion and version management, many of which are recurring points of comparison with the World Wide Web.

Peter Morville, an influential figure in information architecture, discusses intertwingularity in some of his books. In Ambient Findability: What We Find Changes Who We Become (2005), Morville uses the concept of intertwingularity to describe the experience of using hypertext on the web and starting to use computers embedded in everyday objects, known as ubiquitous computing. In 2014, he published a book called Intertwingled: Information Changes Everything about the intertwingularity of the universe, crediting Nelson with the word.

David Weinberger wrote about intertwingularity in Everything Is Miscellaneous: The Power of the New Digital Disorder in 2008, explaining that providing unique identifiers for items helps enable intertwingularity. Intertwingularity and the philosophy of hypertextual systems have also been considered within system design as a means of increasing user agency in opposition to algorithm-based or agentic systems.

=== Academic ===
The concept of intertwingularity was celebrated at the "Intertwingled: The Work and Influence of Ted Nelson" conference on April 14, 2014, at Chapman University. The organizers published a book called Intertwingled: The Work and Influence of Ted Nelson in 2015, with articles about Nelson's work and legacy. One of the organizers of the conference and editors of the book, Douglas Dechow, said, "In the 1960s, he saw a world of networked, interlinked – intertwingled, if you will – documents where all of the world’s knowledge is able to interact and intermingle [...] He was the first, or among the first, people to have that idea."

Often referring back to Ted Nelson's characterization of intertwingularity, intertwingularity is used in other academic disciplines to describe a non-hierarchical form of organization based on the interconnectedness of its associated elements. In education, intertwingularity has been used to describe the interconnectedness of concepts and technology in learning environments, largely in support of the digitization, accessibility or reassessment of traditional pedagogy.

== See also ==
- Connectedness
- Directed graph
- Gunk (mereology)
- Multicategory
- Multiclass classification, Multicriteria classification, Multi-label classification
- Multigraph
- Multiple inheritance
- Polysemy
- Rhizome (philosophy)
