= Intermedia (hypertext) =

Intermedia was the third notable hypertext project to emerge from Brown University, after HES (1967) and FRESS (1969). Intermedia was started in 1985 by Norman Meyrowitz, who had been associated with sooner hypertext research at Brown. The Intermedia project coincided with the establishment of the Institute for Research in Information and Scholarship (IRIS). Some of the materials that came from Intermedia, authored by Meyrowitz, Nancy Garrett, and Karen Catlin were used in the development of HTML.

Intermedia ran on A/UX version 1.1. Intermedia was programmed using an object-oriented toolkit and standard DBMS functions. Intermedia supported bi-directional, dual-anchor links for both text and graphics. Small icons are used as anchor markers. Intermedia properties include author, creation date, title, and keywords. Link information is stored by the system apart from the source text. More than one such set of data can be kept, which allows each user to have their own "web" of information. Intermedia has complete multi-user support, with three levels of access rights: read, write, and annotate, which is similar to Unix permissions.

As promising as Intermedia was, it used a lot of resources for its time (it required 4 MB of RAM and 80 MB of hard drive space in 1989). It was also highly tied to A/UX, a less popular Unix-like operating system that ran on Apple Macintosh computers; thus, it wasn't very portable. In 1991, changes in A/UX and lack of funding ended the Intermedia project.

== See also ==
- Xanadu
- Microcosm
- Hyper-G (or HyperWave)
