= The Hackers Conference =

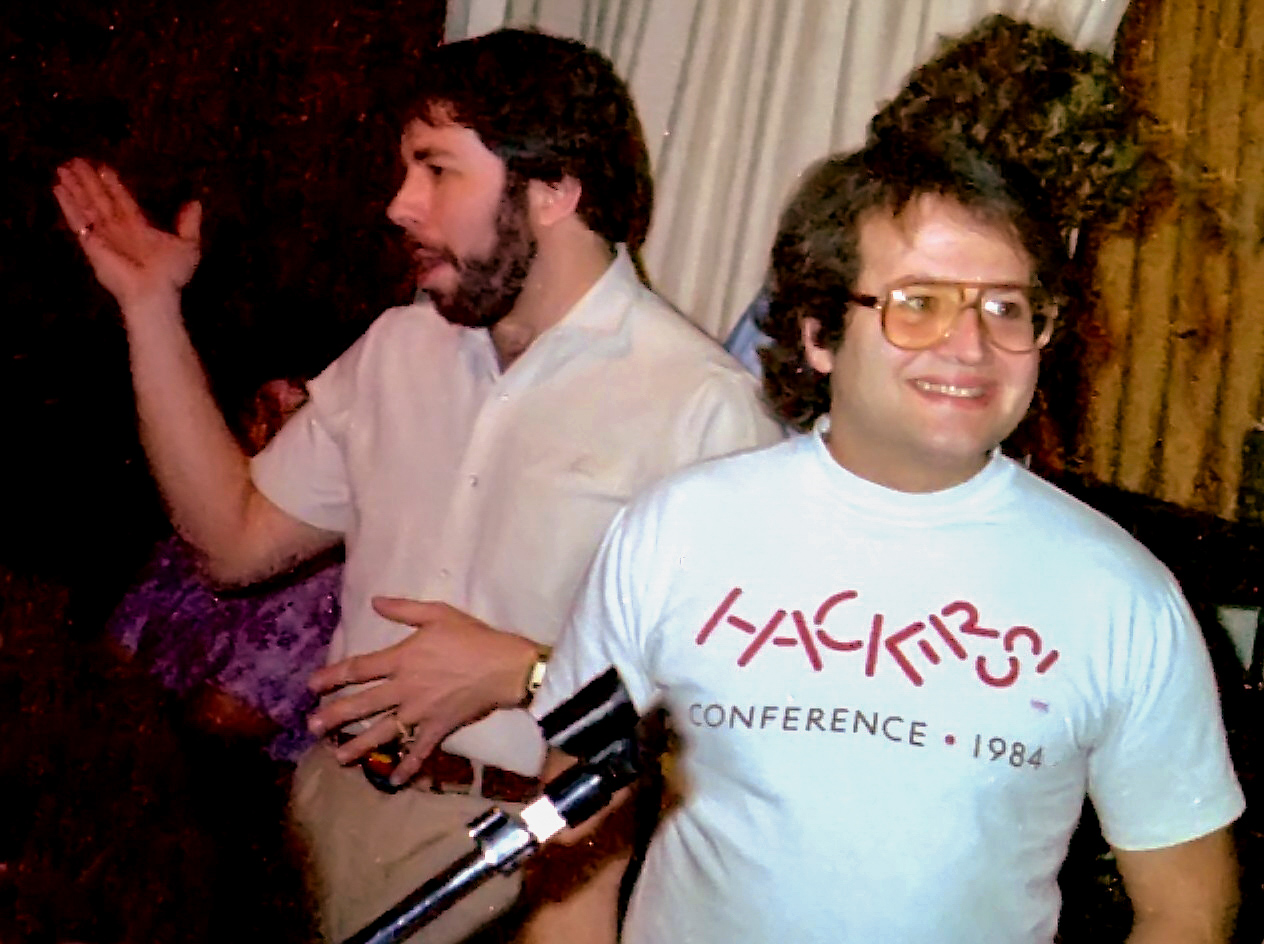
Andy Hertzfeld wearing a Hackers Conference t-shirt

The Hackers Conference is an annual invitation-only gathering of designers, engineers and programmers to discuss the latest developments and innovations in the computer industry. On a daily basis, many hackers only interact virtually, and therefore rarely have face-to-face contact. The conference is a time for hackers to come together to share ideas.

== History ==
The first Hackers Conference was organized in 1984 in Marin County, California, by Stewart Brand and his associates at Whole Earth and The Point Foundation. It was conceived in response to Steven Levy's book, Hackers: Heroes of the Computer Revolution, which inspired Brand to arrange a meeting between the individuals, or "hackers", the book named. The first conference's roughly 150 attendees included Steve Wozniak, Ted Nelson, Richard Stallman, John Draper, Richard Greenblatt, Robert Woodhead, and Bob Wallace. The gathering has been identified as instrumental in establishing the libertarian ethos attributed to cyberculture, and was the subject of a PBS documentary, produced by KQED: Hackers: Wizards of the Electronic Age.

== Participants at the original 1984 Hackers Conference ==
Here is the list of participants at the original 1984 Hackers Conference, given in the contact list distributed to participants titled "List of Participants at the Hackers' Conference November 9–11, 1984"

Arthur Abraham, Roe Adams, Phil Agre, Dick Ainsworth, Bob Albrecht, Bill Atkinson, Bill Bates, Allen Baum, Bruce Baumgart, Mike Beeler, Ward Bell, Gerry Berkowitz, Nancy Blachman, Steve Bobker, Stewart Bonn, Russell Brand, Stewart Brand, John Brockman, Dennis Brothers, Bill Budge, John Bumgarner, Bill Burns, Art Canfil, Steve Capps, Doug Carlston, Simon Cassidy, Dave Caulkins, Richard Cheshire, Fred Cisin, Mike Coffey, Margot Comstock, Rich Davis, Steven Dompier, Wes Dorman, John Draper, Mark Duchaineau, Les Earnest, Philip Elmer-DeWitt, Erik Fair, Richard Fateman, Lee Felsenstein, Jay Fenlason, Fabrice Florin, Andrew Fluegelman, Robert Frankston, Paul Freiberger, Rob Fulop, Robert Gaskins, Nasir Gebelli, Steve Gibson, Geoff Goodfellow, Richard Greenblatt, Roger Gregory, Leslie Grimm, Robert Hardy, Brian Harvey, Dick Heiser, Matt Herron, Andy Hertzfeld, Bruce Horn, David Hughes, John James, Tom Jennings, Jerry Jewell, Chris Jochumson, Ted Kaehler, Sat Tara Khalsa, Scott Kim, Peter LaDeau, Fred Lakin, Marc Le Brun, Jim Leeke, David Levitt, Steven Levy, Henry Lieberman, Efrem Lipkin, William Low, David Lubar, Scott Mace, John Markoff, David Maynard, Bob McConaghy, Roger Melen, Diana Merry, Mark Miller, Charles Moore, Michael Naimark, Ted Nelson, Terry Niksch, Guy Nouri, David Oster, Ray Ozzie, Donn Parker, Howard Pearlmutter, Mark Pelczarski, Michael Perry, Patricia Phelan, Tom Pittman, Eric Podietz, Kevin Poulsen, Jerry Pournelle, Larry Press, Steve Purcell, Christopher Reed, David Reed, Barbara Robertson, Michael Rogers, Pete Rowe, Peter Samson, Steve Saunders, Laura Scholl, Rich Schroeppel, Tom Scoville, Rony Sebok, Rhod Sharp, Bob Shur, Burrell Smith, David Snider, Tom Spence, Bud Spurgeon, Richard Stallman, Michael Swaine, David Taylor, Jack Trainor, Bud Tribble, Bruce H. Van Natta, Bob Wallace, Walter E. (Gene) Wallis, Bruce Webster, Ken Williams, Deborah Wise, Steve Witham, Robert Woodhead, Don Woods, Steve Wozniak, Fred Wright

== Logo ==
Scott Kim designed the iconic Hackers Conference logo.
