= Microcosm (hypermedia system) =

Microcosm was a hypermedia system, originally developed in 1988 by the Department of Electronics and Computer Science at the University of Southampton, with a small team of researchers in the Computer Science group: Wendy Hall, Andrew Fountain, Hugh Davis and Ian Heath. The system pre-dates the web and builds on early hypermedia systems, such as Ted Nelson's Project Xanadu and work of Douglas Engelbart. Like Intermedia or Hyper-G, which were other hypermedia systems created around the same time, Microcosm stores links between documents in a separate database.

== See also ==
- Xanadu
- Intermedia
- Hyper-G (or HyperWave)
