= Enfilade (disambiguation) =

Enfilade is a military formation laterally exposed to enemy fire.

Enfilade may also refer to:

- Enfilade (architecture), a suite of rooms along the same axis
- Enfilade (Xanadu), a type of computational data structure
- Enfilade (song), a 2000 song by At the Drive-In
