= Istream =

"Istream" may refer to:

- Enfilade (Xanadu)#Types of enfilades in Xanadu
- C++ Standard Library#Streams and input/output
