= Poornima Vijayashanker =

Engineer and entrepreneur

- Education: Duke University
- Scientific career
- Fields: Electrical engineering, computer science
- Workplaces: Synopsys, Mint
- Website: http://femgineer.com/

Poornima Vijayashanker is an engineer and entrepreneur. She is also a teacher at various tech hubs in San Francisco such as General Assembly, Parisoma and Hackbright. She has also started Femgineer, a blog and teaching platform.

== Biography ==
During Vijayashanker's childhood, electronics were routinely "taken apart for fun" at her house. Vijayashanker took apart her first computer at age 14. The men in her family were all engineers, but as a child, Vijayashanker wanted to be a lawyer because being an engineer didn't seem "glamorous or exciting." Vijayashanker began to write computer code right after high school. After starting college at Duke University, she changed her mind, deciding that engineering would be "a cool and intense field." She double-majored in Electrical Engineering and Computer Science.

After graduating, Vijayashanker started work as a research and development engineer at Synopsys. Vijayashanker was a founding engineer at Mint.com when it was a start-up company, where she was also the only woman on staff. Vijayashanker was instrumental in building software for Mint from scratch. While at Mint, she began Femgineer in 2007, in order to write about her experiences and show that "women can be sophisticated, cultured, and still be engineers, Femgineers!" After Mint was acquired by Intuit, she left to start her own company, BizeeBee, which is a platform for fitness studios which tracks attendance, revenue and controls marketing for these types of businesses.

In 2014, she gave her first TEDx talk where she discusses why tinkering is useful. In 2015, she released an eBook, titled How to Transform Your Ideas Into Software Products. In 2015, she co-authored "Present! A Techie's Guide to Public Speaking" with Karen Catlin.

Vijayashanker has said that if society wants to see more women in technology careers, then it is important to have more role models for women in technology. She also emphasizes the importance of encouraging women to pursue "hard-core engineering or finance roles" because these jobs are more likely to lead to top positions in the company.

Vijayashanker lives in Palo Alto, California.
