= Literary Machines =

1981 book by Ted Nelson

- Author: Ted Nelson
- Language: English
- Genre: Computer Science
- Publisher: Mindful Press
- Publication date: 1981
- Publication place: United States
- ISBN: 0893470554

Literary Machines (short title) is a book first published in 1981 by Ted Nelson and republished nine times by 1993. It offers an extensive overview of Nelson's term "hypertext" as well as Nelson's Project Xanadu. It also includes other theories by Nelson, including "tumblers" for addressing bits in files past and present, "transclusion" as a method for including original work in one's own work, and "micropayments" to pay for the use. The format of the book is nonlinear, as the chapters are arranged in such a way that the text can be read out of order.

The preface to the 1993 edition states "The first edition of Literary Machines, done on a typewriter, appeared in April of 1981. We printed it on a Saxon copier that filled the house with a vinegar smell. But it had a beautiful cover, its white title silk-screened on mirrored plastic. Since that time the book has gone through various editions with different-colored covers, printed by various people with various degrees of permission. The main revision took place in 1987, when I added most of the technical material..."

The preface to the second edition, also in 1981, states "This special edition of Literary Machines has been printed by XOC, Inc. under special arrangement with Ted Nelson. Certain changes have been made in the text by XOC, Inc. to reflect the current status of the Xanadu System. These changes are clearly indicated."

The first edition of the book, referred to by Nelson as "The Humanist Edition", featured a silver Mylar cover. Subsequent editions, referred to by Nelson as "The Technical Edition" featured a white soft cover.
