= Binary-safe =

A binary-safe function treats its input as a raw stream of bytes and ignores every textual aspect it may have. The term is mainly used in the PHP programming language to describe expected behaviour when passing binary data into functions whose main responsibility is text and string manipulating, and is used widely in the official PHP documentation.

== Binary-safe file read and write ==
While all textual data can be represented in binary form, it must be done so through character encoding. In addition to this, how newlines are represented may vary depending on the platform used. Windows, Linux and macOS all represent newlines differently in binary form. This means that reading a file as binary data, parsing it as text and then writing it back to disk (thus reconverting it back to binary form) may result in a different binary representation than the one originally used.

Most programming languages let the programmer decide whether to parse the contents of a file as text or read it as binary data. To convey this intent, special flags or different functions exist when reading or writing files to disk. For example, in the PHP, C, and C++ programming languages, developers have to use fopen($filename, "rb") instead of fopen($filename, "r") to read the file as a binary stream instead of interpreting the textual data as such. This may also be referred to as reading in 'binary safe' mode.
