= Scott Kim =

American artist and writer

Scott Edward Kim (born 1955 in Washington, D.C.) is an American puzzle designer, video game designer, artist, author, and recreational mathematician. He has published puzzles in various magazines, including Discover, Scientific American, and Games. He is a regular speaker on puzzle design, notably at the International Game Developers Conference, The Casual Games Conference and TED conferences. Along with John Langdon he is one of the co-discoverers of ambigrams.

From the 1970s onward, his puzzles were frequently published in Martin Gardner's "Mathematical Games" column in Scientific American. He has been involved in organizing and participating in the Gathering 4 Gardner conferences from the first one in 1990.

Kim has designed logos for Silicon Graphics, the Geostationary Operational Environmental Satellite, the Hackers Conference, the Computer Game Developers Conference, the Gathering 4 Gardner conference and the Dylan programming language.

== Early life and education ==
Born in 1955 in Washington, D.C., and of Korean descent, Kim grew up in Rolling Hills Estates, California and developed early interests in mathematics, education, and art. He attended Stanford University, receiving a BA in music in 1976, and a PhD in Computers and Graphic Design in 1987, with the dissertation "Viewpoint: Toward a Computer for Visual Thinkers" under Donald Knuth.

Kim's ideas about art and computing are described in the book Programmers at Work, a collection of interviews published by Microsoft Press in 1986.

He started writing an occasional "Boggler" column for Discover magazine in 1990, and became an exclusive columnist in 1999. He has created hundreds of puzzles for magazines such as Scientific American and Games, as well as thousands of puzzles for computer games. He held the Harold Keables chair at Iolani School in 2008.

== Works ==
Books

- 1981 Inversions, Byte Books, ISBN 1-55953-280-7, a book of 60 original ambigrams
- 1989 Letterforms & Illusion, W. H. Freeman & Co., created with Robin Samelson, accompanies the book, Inversions.
- 2006 Brainteasers, Mind Benders, Games, Word Searches, Puzzlers, Mazes & More Calendar 2007, Workman Publishing Company, ISBN 0-7611-4079-4
- 2012 How Puzzles Improve Your Brain

Computer games

- Heaven and Earth, Buena Vista / Disney
- The Next Tetris, Hasbro Interactive, PlayStation
- Obsidian, SegaSoft, Microsoft Windows, Mac OS
- Charlie Blast's Territory Nintendo 64

Puzzles, toys and board games

- 1969 Quintapaths, published by Kadon (tiling puzzle)
- 1998 Railroad Rush Hour, ThinkFun (toy)

== Personal life ==
Kim lives in Burlingame, California with his wife Amy Jo, son Gabriel and daughter Lila Rose. Amy Jo Kim is the author of Community Building on the Web.
