= Roger Gregory (programmer) =

American computer programmer, technologist, and scientist

Roger Everett Gregory
- Occupation: computer programmer
- Known for: a key developer of Project Xanadu

Roger Everett Gregory is a US computer programmer, technologist, and scientist. Gregory's work in project Xanadu made him one of the earliest pioneers of hypertext technology, which helped lay the foundations for the hyperlink technology that underlies the World Wide Web. Gregory attended the University of Michigan as a mathematics major. In the 1970s, he founded the Ann Arbor Computer Club, similar to the West Coast's Home Brew Computer Club.

In 1974 Gregory met Theodore Holm (Ted) Nelson, the author of Computer Lib/Dream Machines, and the thinker who coined the term "hypertext". The pair became friends. In 1979 Nelson convinced Gregory to move from Michigan and join him in Swarthmore, Pennsylvania, the small, sleepy college town outside of Philadelphia where Nelson earned his undergraduate degree, and first conceived the concept of a hypertext. Gregory's first summer in Swarthmore, characterized by Xanadu insiders as the "Swarthmore Summer", was a productive time, where Nelson and Gregory enjoyed the collaboration of other volunteers, including Stuart Greene and Mark S. Miller.

In 1988 Nelson, Gregory, and other members of their team, all moved to Sausalito, California, when Autodesk, a manufacturer of Computer aided design software, purchased a controlling interest in the Xanadu Project.

Later, as founder, CEO, CTO and Chairman of the Board of Xanadu Operating Company, Gregory led design and development of a hypertext technology that includes quotable documents with version control, fine-grained, bidirectional links, the ability to track intellectual property rights, and a mechanism to pay royalties. Gregory is also co-designer of a rotary rocket engine design based on the posthumous patents of Robert Goddard (U.S. patent 6212876 from 2001). Today he is a cofounder of Eyegorithm.

In 2010 Gregory was interviewed by the Internet Archive.
