= Norman Meyrowitz =

Norman K. Meyrowitz
- Occupations: Computer scientist and software executive

Academic background
- Education: Sc.B. in Computer Science
- Alma mater: Brown University
- Thesis: BRUWIN: A UNIX-Based Color Graphics Window Manager/Virtual Terminal System. (1981)

Academic work
- Institutions: Brown University

Norman K. Meyrowitz is a computer scientist and software executive who has led the design and development of multiple hypertext and multimedia software systems. He is an adjunct professor of the Practice of Computer Science at Brown University.

Meyrowitz is most known for his work on linking and multimedia technology pre-WWW, as well as for the evolution of web development software. He received an Sc.B. in Computer Science from Brown University in 1981, where he worked with Andries van Dam.

== Career ==
At Brown, Meyrowitz created BRUWIN, the world's first-Unix based window manager. In the 1980s, he was a co-director at Brown University's Institute for Research in Information and Scholarship (IRIS) where he served as the principal architect of Intermedia, a hypermedia system that influenced both the creator of the web and the creator of the Mosaic. During the mid-1980s, he also co-founded two ACM conferences—OOPSLA (Object-Oriented Programming, Systems, and Languages) and Hypertext 87. After his academic career, he spent several years as the Director of System/User Software for the PenPoint operating system at GO Corporation. He later held various roles at Macromedia (which was acquired by Adobe), the last of which was President of Products. At Macromedia, he oversaw CD-ROM, web development, and multimedia products such as Shockwave, Dreamweaver, Flash, and Flash Player.

In 2019, Meyrowitz was appointed an adjunct professor of the Practice in Computer Science at Brown.

== Contributions ==
Meyrowitz is most known for his work on hypertext and multimedia technology before and during the Internet era, as well as the evolution of web development software, particularly Intermedia in the late 1980s. He has received three patents for his contributions.

=== Anchors ===
Meyrowitz coined the word and generalized the concept of "anchor," which was used by Tim Berners-Lee to represent the source of the hypertext link when creating HTML. He drove the adoption of anchor in the hypertext field to represent any selection in any type of document (text, graphics, audio, and video) that could be the source or destination of a link.

=== Intermedia ===
Meyrowitz was the principal architect of IRIS's Intermedia system, which began development in 1985, before the creation of the WWW. Intermedia's paradigm integrated bi-directional hypermedia links between different applications within the graphical desktop interface that Apple had introduced just a year earlier.

== Awards and honors ==
- 2000 – 100 most influential Brown alumni of the 20th century, Brown University

== Selected articles ==
- Meyrowitz, N., & Van Dam, A. (1982). Interactive editing systems: Part I. ACM Computing Surveys (CSUR), 14(3), 321–352.
- Yankelovich, N., Meyrowitz, N., & Van Dam, A. (1985). Reading and writing the electronic book. Computer, 18(10), 15–30.
- Meyrowitz, N. (1986). Intermedia: The architecture and construction of an object-oriented hypermedia system and applications framework. ACM SIGPLAN Notices, 21(11), 186–201.
- Yankelovich, N., Haan, B. J., Meyrowitz, N. K., & Drucker, S. M. (1988). Intermedia: The concept and the construction of a seamless information environment. Computer, 21(1), 81–96.
- Haan, B. J., Kahn, P., Riley, V. A., Coombs, J. H., & Meyrowitz, N. K. (1992). IRIS hypermedia services. Communications of the ACM, 35(1), 36–51.
