= Karen Catlin =

American tech executive (born 1963)

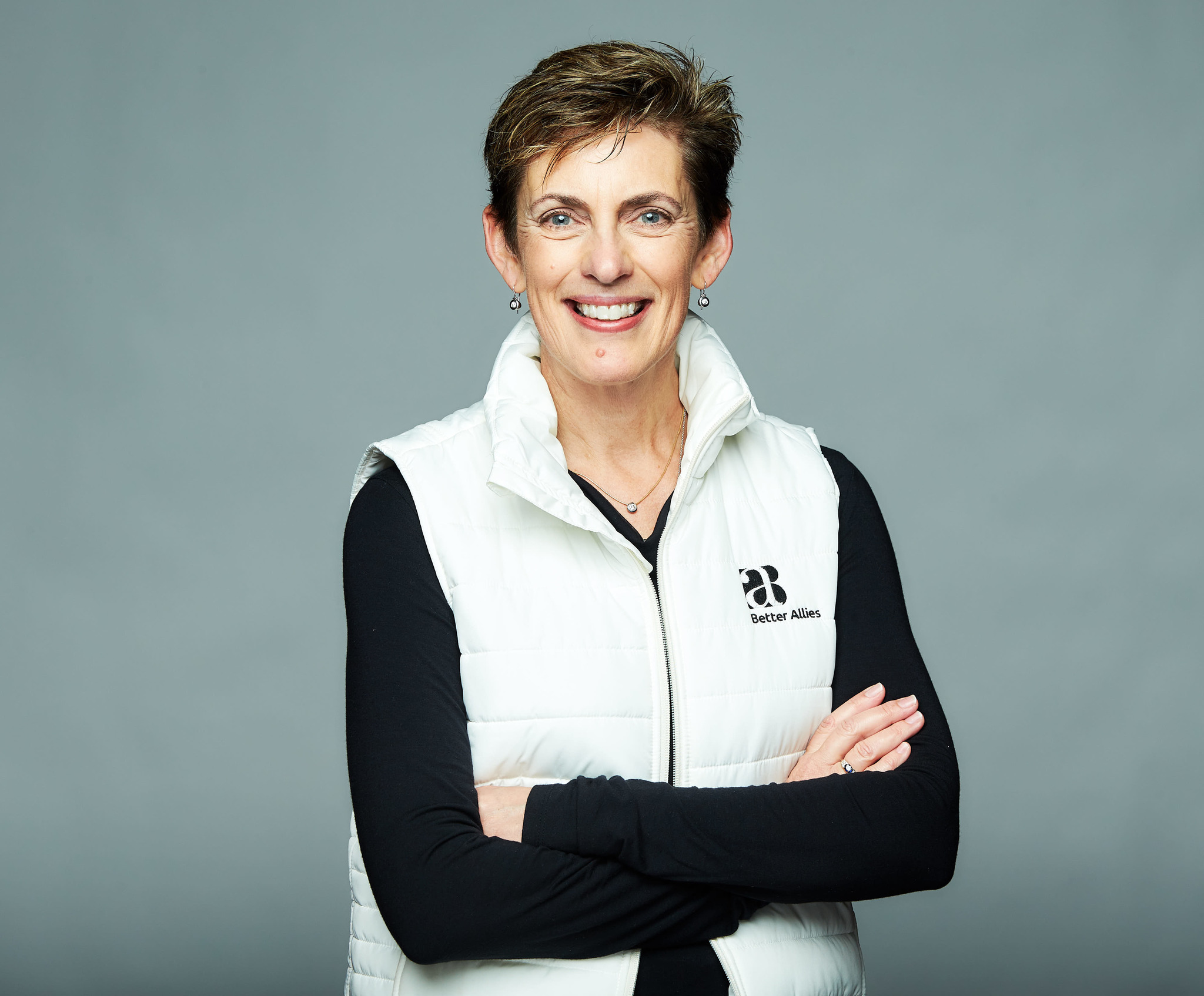
- Born: Karen Smith; 1963 (age 62–63); Westerly, Rhode Island
- Education: Brown University
- Occupations: Author, speaker, leadership coach
- Known for: Former VP of Engineering at Adobe Systems, Author of Better Allies
- Board member of: DigitalNEST

Karen Smith Catlin (born 1963) is an American tech executive and advocate for inclusive workplaces. She most recently served as a vice president in the Office of the CTO at Adobe Systems. She is a frequent speaker at technology events.

From 1985 to 1990, Catlin worked as a software developer on the Intermedia system at Brown University, where she published numerous peer-reviewed articles in ACM journals. She then joined Macromedia in 1993 as an early employee, initially responsible for product localization. She went on to develop the program management discipline for the company and was promoted to the vice president level, leading shared engineering services across the entire product line. Catlin worked at Macromedia until 2006, when Adobe Systems acquired the company. She was an executive at Adobe Systems from 2006 to 2012, responsible for shared engineering services.

Catlin has published five books: Present! A Techie's Guide to Public Speaking (coauthored with Poornima Vijayashanker (2015); Better Allies: Everyday Actions to Create Inclusive, Engaging Workplaces (2019); The Better Allies® Approach to Hiring (2020); Belonging in Healthcare: The Better Allies® Approach to Creating More Inclusive Workplaces (2022); and The Better Allies® Way (2024).
