= Gary Wolf (journalist) =

American writer (born 1961)

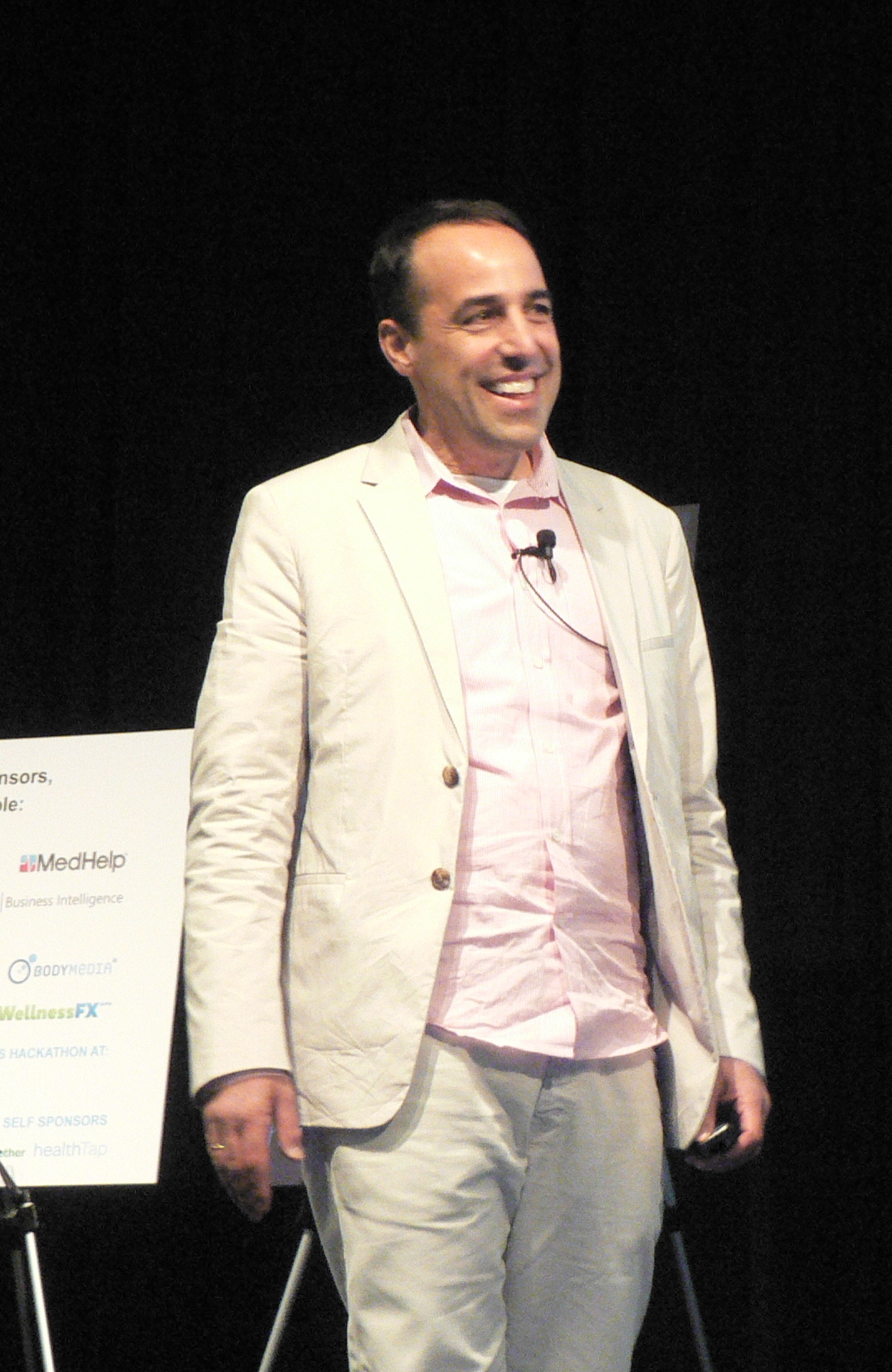
- Gary Wolf in 2011
- Born: 1961 (age 64–65)
- Education: Reed College (BA); UC Berkeley (MA)
- Occupations: Journalist; writer
- Employer: Wired
- Organization: Quantified Self
- Known for: Quantified Self
- Parents: Dr. Harold 'Hal' Wolf (father); Dr. Joan Silverman Wolf (mother)
- Website: Story Archive

Gary Wolf is an American writer, contributing editor at Wired magazine, and co-founder of the Quantified Self. Wolf earned a BA from Reed College in Portland, Oregon and an MA from the University of California, Berkeley.

Wolf published for The New York Times Magazine, and Wired. Wolf wrote several long articles for Wired magazine. Among them he wrote an article about Ted Nelson and Project Xanadu, Steve Wozniak, Ray Kurzweil, a long interview with Steve Jobs, and Amazon. He coined the pejorative New Atheism in 2006 to describe the positions promoted by some atheists of the 21st century, among them Richard Dawkins, Sam Harris, Christopher Hitchens and Daniel Dennett.

In 2007, with Kevin Kelly, Wolf co-founded the Quantified Self, a collaboration of users and tool makers who share an interest in self-knowledge through self-tracking. In 2010, he spoke about the movement at TED.

In 2020, he codeveloped a conceptual framework to guide research and education into the practice of personal science.

== Books ==
- Aether Madness: An Offbeat Guide to the Online World, with Michael Stein (Peachpit Press, 1995)
- Dumb Money: Adventures of a Day Trader, with Joey Anuff (Random House, 2000)
- Wired – A Romance (Random House, 2003)
- The Quantified Self: Learning to Observe (Workman Publishing Company, 2026)
