= Institute for Research in Information and Scholarship =

Education organization in Rhode Island, US

The Institute for Research in Information and Scholarship (IRIS) was founded at Brown University by Andries van Dam, William S. Shipp, and Norman Meyrowitz in 1983 and closed in 1991. It was initially part of a campus-wide effort at Brown to develop a "scholar's workstation."

The Intermedia advanced hypertext authoring system was the most significant project developed at IRIS.

IRIS partnered with the Getty Art History Information Program to conduct a study of the research methods of art historians in the mid 1980s. The results of this study can be found in Bakewell, E.; Beeman, W; Reese, C and Schmitt, M., (Gen. Ed.). (1988). Object, image, inquiry: The art historian at work. Santa Monica: CA: Getty Art History Information Program.

The records are archived.
