= Virtuality (software design) =

Virtuality is a term used by Ted Nelson for what he considers one of the central issues of software design. "Virtuality" refers to the seeming of anything, as opposed to its reality. (This has been the dictionary meaning of "virtuality" since at least the 18th century). Everything has a reality and a virtuality. Nelson divides virtuality into two parts: conceptual structure and feel so in every field these have different roles. The conceptual structure of all cars are the same, but the conceptual structure of every movie is different. The reality of a car is important, but the reality of a movie is unimportant—how a shot was made is of interest only to movie buffs.

The feel of software, like the feel of a car, is a matter of late-stage fine-tuning (if it is worked on at all). But Nelson regards the design of software conceptual structure—the constructs we imagine as we sit at the screen—as the center of the computer field. However, the conceptual structure of almost all software has been determined by what Nelson calls the PARC User Interface, or PUI, on which Windows, Macintosh and Linux are all based. The feel is only icing on top of that.

In relation to new media, Steve Woolgar has proposed 'five rules of virtuality'" that are drawn from in-depth research in the UK on uses of the so-called 'New Media':

1. Both the uptake and uses of new media are critically dependent on the non-ICT-related contexts in which people are situated (gender, age, employment, income, education, nationality).
2. Fears and risks associated with new media are unevenly socially distributed, particularly in relation to security and surveillance.
3. CMC-mediated or 'virtual' interactions supplement rather than substitute for 'real' activities.
4. The introduction of more scope for 'virtual' interaction acts as a stimulus for more face-to-face or 'real' interaction.
5. The capacity of 'virtual' communication to promote globalization throughout communication that is spatially disembedded encourages, perhaps paradoxically, new forms of 'localism' and the embedding, rather than the transcendence, of identities grounded in a sense of place, belief, experience, or practice.
