= Computer Lib/Dream Machines =

1974 book by Ted Nelson

- First edition cover
- Author: Ted Nelson
- Language: English
- Publisher: Self-published (1st ed.); Tempus Books/Microsoft Press (2nd ed.)
- Publication date: 1974 (1st ed.); 1987 (2nd ed.)
- Publication place: United States
- Media type: Print (Paperback)
- ISBN: 0-89347-002-3
- OCLC: 217227165

Computer Lib/Dream Machines is a 1974 book by Ted Nelson, printed as a two-front-cover paperback to indicate its "intertwingled" nature. Originally self-published by Nelson, it was republished with a foreword by Stewart Brand in 1987 by Microsoft Press.

In Steven Levy's book Hackers, Computer Lib is described as "the epic of the computer revolution, the bible of the hacker dream. [Nelson] was stubborn enough to publish it when no one else seemed to think it was a good idea."

Published just before the release of the Altair 8800 kit, Computer Lib is often considered the first book about the personal computer.

== Background ==
Prior to the initial release of Computer Lib/Dream Machines, Nelson was working on the first hypertext project, Project Xanadu, founded in 1960. An integral part to the Xanadu vision was computing technology and the freedom he believed came with it. These ideas were later compiled and elaborated upon in the 1974 text, around the time when locally networked computers had appeared and Nelson found global networks as a space for the hypertext system.

== Synopsis ==
=== Computer Lib ===
In Computer Lib. You can and must understand computers NOW, Nelson covers both the technical and political aspects of computers.

Nelson attempts to explain computers to the laymen during a time when personal computers had not yet become mainstream and anticipated the machine being open for anyone to use. Nelson writes about the need for people to understand computers more deeply than was generally promoted as computer literacy, which he considers a superficial kind of familiarity with particular hardware and software. His rallying cry "Down with Cybercrud" is against the centralization of computers such as that performed by IBM at the time, as well as against what he sees as the intentional untruths that "computer people" tell to non-computer people to keep them from understanding computers.

=== Dream Machines ===
Dream Machines. New Freedom through Computer Screens- a Minority Report, is the opposite of the Computer Lib side. Nelson explores what he believes is the future of computers and the alternative uses for them. This side was his counterculture approach to how computers had typically been used.

Nelson covers the flexible media potential of the computer, which was shockingly new at the time. He saw the use of hypermedia and hypertext, both terms he coined, being beneficial for creativity and education. He urged readers to look at the computer not as just a scientific machine, but as an interactive machine that can be accessible to anyone.

In this section, Nelson also described the details of Project Xanadu. He proposed the idea of a future Xanadu Network, where users could shop at Xanadu stands and access material from global storage systems.

== Format ==
Both the 1974 and 1987 editions have an unconventional layout, with two front covers. The Computer Lib cover features a raised fist in a computer. Once flipped over, the Dream Machines cover shows a man with a cape flying with a finger pointed to a screen. The division between the two sides is marked by text (for the other side) rotated 180°.

The book was stylistically influenced by Stewart Brand's Whole Earth Catalog. The text itself is broken up into many sections, with simulated pull-quotes, comics, sidebars, etc., similar to a magazine layout.

According to Steven Levy, Nelson's format requirements for the book's "over-sized pages loaded with print so small you could hardly read it, along with scribbled notations, and manically amateurish drawings" may have contributed to the difficulty of finding a publisher for the first edition - Nelson paid 2,000 dollars out of his own pocket for the first print run of several hundred copies.

Besides the Whole Earth Catalog, the layout also bore similarities to the People's Computer Company (PCC) newsletter, published by a Menlo Park based group of the same name, where Nelson's book would gain (as described by Levy) "a cult following ... Ted Nelson was treated like royalty at [PCC] potluck dinners."

== Neologisms ==
In Computer Lib, Nelson introduced a few words that he coined :

- Cybercrud: "the author's own term for the practice of putting things over on people using computers (especially, forcing them to adapt to a rigid, inflexible, poorly thought out system)". In the text, Nelson puts forth the rallying cry "Down with Cybercrud!"
- Hypertext: originally coined in 1965, is text displayed which references other information that a user can access. Nelson explores the types of the term and its future in computers greatly within Computer Lib. Some include:
  - Chunk style consists of 'chunks' of separate text or media connected by links.
  - Stretch text is text that extends itself. Instead of linking, it zooms in depending on the detail needed.
- Intertwingularity: Nelson says "Everything is deeply intertwingled". He says that all subjects and information are connected. The term comes from the merging of intertwined and intermingled.
- Fantics: "the art and science of getting ideas across, both emotionally and cognitively". Nelson explains this as the audience receiving feelings while also receiving information from content.

== Legacy ==
After its release, it drew an underground following from media theorists to computer hackers. In his book Tools for Thought, Howard Rheingold calls Computer Lib "the best-selling underground manifesto of the microcomputer revolution."

It has since been referred to as "the most influential book in the history of computational media", as well as "the most important book in the history of new media" in The New Media Reader.

One of the most widely adopted ideas from Computer Lib was Ted Nelson's "chunk-style" hypertext. This type of hypertext is used in most websites today.

As the book came out before the first personal computer and its rise in popularity, Nelson has been credited with predicting how we interact with computers in terms of arts and entertainment, like video games. He was one of the first to present the computer as an "all-purpose machine".

In 1989, Microsoft Press published Learn BASIC Now, written by Michael Halvorson and David Rygmyr. The book and its successors used Nelson's call to action ("You can and must understand computers NOW") to encourage new audiences to learn computer programming on personal computers. Halvorson later credited Nelson with helping to launch the learn-to-program movement in America. "It is not an overstatement to say that this book and its positive message about computers and computer literacy changed computing history."
