= Docuverse =

Docuverse is a global distributed electronic library of interconnected documents, in other words, a global metadocument. The term was coined by Ted Nelson in 1974, as a concept related to the Project Xanadu, and the World Wide Web later nominally fulfilled a subset of the aspects of Nelson's vision.
