= Context-sensitive =

Context-sensitive is an adjective meaning "depending on context" or "depending on circumstances". It may refer to:

- Context-sensitive meaning, where meaning depends on context (language use)
  - Context-sensitive grammar, a formal grammar in which the left-hand sides and right-hand sides of any production rules may be surrounded by a context of terminal and nonterminal symbols
  - Context-sensitive language, a formal language that can be defined by a context-sensitive grammar (and equivalently by a noncontracting grammar). Context-sensitive is one of the four types of grammars in the Chomsky hierarchy
- Context-sensitive help, a kind of online help that is obtained from a specific point in the state of the software, providing help for the situation that is associated with that state
- Context-sensitive solutions (also called Context Sensitive Design), a theoretical and practical approach to transportation decision-making and design that takes into consideration the communities and lands through which streets, roads, and highways pass ("the context")
- Context-sensitive user interface, in computing
