= Project Xanadu =

First hypertext project, founded in 1960

Project Xanadu (/ˈzænəduː/ ZAN-ə-doo) was the first hypertext project, founded in 1960 by Ted Nelson. Administrators of Project Xanadu declared it superior to the World Wide Web, with the mission statement: "Today's popular software simulates paper. The World Wide Web (another imitation of paper) trivialises our original hypertext model with one-way ever-breaking links and no management of version or contents."

Wired magazine published an article entitled "The Curse of Xanadu", calling Project Xanadu "the longest-running vaporware story in the history of the computer industry". The first attempt at implementation began in 1960, but it was not until 1998 that an incomplete implementation was released. A version described as "a working deliverable", OpenXanadu, was made available in 2014.

== History ==
Nelson's vision was for a "digital repository scheme for world-wide electronic publishing". Nelson states that the idea began in 1960, when he was a student at Harvard University. He proposed a machine-language program which would store and display documents, together with the ability to perform edits. This was different from a word processor (which had not been invented yet) in that the functionality would have included visual comparisons of different versions of the document, a concept Nelson would later call "intercomparison".

On top of this basic idea, Nelson wanted to facilitate nonsequential writing, in which the reader could choose their own path through an electronic document. He built upon this idea in a paper to the Association for Computing Machinery (ACM) in 1965, calling the new idea "zippered lists". These zippered lists would allow compound documents to be formed from pieces of other documents, a concept named transclusion. In 1967, while working for Harcourt, Brace, he named his project Xanadu, in honor of the poem "Kubla Khan" by Samuel Taylor Coleridge.

Nelson's talk at the ACM predicted many of the features of today's hypertext systems, but at the time, his ideas had little impact. Though researchers were intrigued by his ideas, Nelson lacked the technical knowledge to demonstrate that the ideas could be implemented.

=== 1970s ===
Ted Nelson published his ideas in his 1974 book Computer Lib/Dream Machines and the 1981 Literary Machines.

Computer Lib/Dream Machines is written in a non-sequential fashion: it is a compilation of Nelson's thoughts about computing, among other topics, in no particular order. It contains two books, printed back to back, to be flipped between. Computer Lib contains Nelson's thoughts on topics that angered him, while Dream Machines discusses his hopes for the potential of computers to assist the arts.

In 1972, Cal Daniels completed the first demonstration version of the Xanadu software on a computer Nelson had rented for the purpose, though Nelson soon ran out of money. In 1974, with the advent of computer networking, Nelson refined his thoughts about Xanadu into a centralized source of information, calling it a "docuverse".

In the summer of 1979, Nelson led the latest group of his followers, Roger Gregory, Mark S. Miller and Stuart Greene, to Swarthmore, Pennsylvania. In a house rented by Greene, they hashed out their ideas for Xanadu; but at the end of the summer the group went their separate ways. Miller and Gregory created an addressing system based on transfinite numbers that they called tumblers, which allowed any part of a file to be referenced.

=== 1980s ===
The group continued their work, almost to the point of bankruptcy. In 1983, however, Nelson met John Walker, founder of Autodesk, at The Hackers Conference, a conference originally for the people mentioned in Steven Levy's Hackers, and the group started working on Xanadu with Autodesk's financial backing.

While at Autodesk, the group, led by Gregory, completed a version of the software, written in the C programming language, though the software did not work the way they wanted. However, this version of Xanadu was successfully demonstrated at The Hackers Conference and generated considerable interest. Then a newer group of programmers, hired from Xerox PARC, used the problems with this software as justification to rewrite the software in Smalltalk. This effectively split the group into two factions, and the decision to rewrite put a deadline imposed by Autodesk out of the team's reach. In August 1992, Autodesk divested the Xanadu group, which became the Xanadu Operating Company and struggled due to internal conflicts and lack of investment.

Charles S. Smith, the founder of a company called Memex (named after a hypertext system proposed by Vannevar Bush), hired many of the Xanadu programmers (including lead architects Mark S. Miller, Dean Tribble and Ravi Pandya) and licensed the Xanadu technology, though Memex soon faced financial difficulties, and the then-unpaid programmers left, taking the computers with them (the programmers were eventually paid). At around this time, Tim Berners-Lee was developing the World Wide Web. When the Web began to see large growth that Xanadu did not, Nelson's team grew defensive in the supposed rivalry that was emerging that they were losing. The 1995 Wired Magazine article "The Curse of Xanadu" provoked a harsh rebuttal from Nelson, but contention largely faded as the Web dominated Xanadu.

=== 1990s ===
In 1998, Nelson released the source code to Xanadu as Project Udanax, in the hope that the techniques and algorithms used could help to overturn some software patents.

=== 2000s ===
In 2007, Project Xanadu released XanaduSpace 1.0.

=== 2010s ===
A version described as "a working deliverable", OpenXanadu, was made available on the World Wide Web in 2014. It is called open because "you can see all the parts", but as of June 2014 the site stated that it was "not yet open source". On the site, the creators claim that Tim Berners-Lee stole their idea, and that the World Wide Web is a "bizarre structure created by arbitrary initiatives of varied people and it has a terrible programming language" and that Web security is a "complex maze". They go on to say that Hypertext is designed to be paper, and that the World Wide Web allows nothing more than dead links to other dead pages.

In 2016, Ted Nelson was interviewed by Werner Herzog in his documentary, Lo and Behold, Reveries of the Connected World. "By some, he was labeled insane for clinging on; to us, you appear to be the only one who is clinically sane", Herzog said. Nelson was delighted by the praise. "No one has ever said that before!" said Nelson. "Usually I hear the opposite."

== Original 17 rules ==
1. Every Xanadu server is uniquely and securely identified.
2. Every Xanadu server can be operated independently or in a network.
3. Every user is uniquely and securely identified.
4. Every user can search, retrieve, create, and store documents.
5. Every document can consist of any number of parts each of which may be of any data type.
6. Every document can contain links of any type including virtual copies ("transclusions") to any other document in the system accessible to its owner.
7. Links are visible and can be followed from all endpoints.
8. Permission to link to a document is explicitly granted by the act of publication.
9. Every document can contain a royalty mechanism at any desired degree of granularity to ensure payment on any portion accessed, including virtual copies ("transclusions") of all or part of the document.
10. Every document is uniquely and securely identified.
11. Every document can have secure access controls.
12. Every document can be rapidly searched, stored and retrieved without user knowledge of where it is physically stored.
13. Every document is automatically moved to physical storage appropriate to its frequency of access from any given location.
14. Every document is automatically stored redundantly to maintain availability even in case of a disaster.
15. Every Xanadu service provider can charge their users at any rate they choose for the storage, retrieval, and publishing of documents.
16. Every transaction is secure and auditable only by the parties to that transaction.
17. The Xanadu client–server communication protocol is an openly published standard. Third-party software development and integration is encouraged.

== Tumbler ==
In the design of the Xanadu computer system, a tumbler is an address of any range of content or link or a set of ranges or links. According to Gary Wolf in Wired, the idea of tumblers was that "the address would not only point the reader to the correct machine, it would also indicate the author of the document, the version of the document, the correct span of bytes, and the links associated with these bytes." Tumblers were created by Roger Gregory and Mark Miller.

The idea behind tumblers comes from transfinite numbers.

== In popular culture ==
It is mentioned in the 1998 psychological anime Serial Experiments Lain.

== See also ==
- Enfilade (Xanadu)
- Hypermedia
- ENQUIRE
- Interpedia
- American Information Exchange
- Tent (protocol)
- In addition to the Web, the Project Xanadu FAQ suggests other hypermedia systems which are similar, including HyperWave (or Hyper-G) and:
  - Microcosm (hypermedia system)
  - IBM Notes (descendant of Notes on PLATO (computer system), featured in Nelson's Computer Lib)
- Wiki
- Memex
- ipfs
