= Ted Nelson =

American pioneer of information technology, philosopher, and sociologist (born 1937)

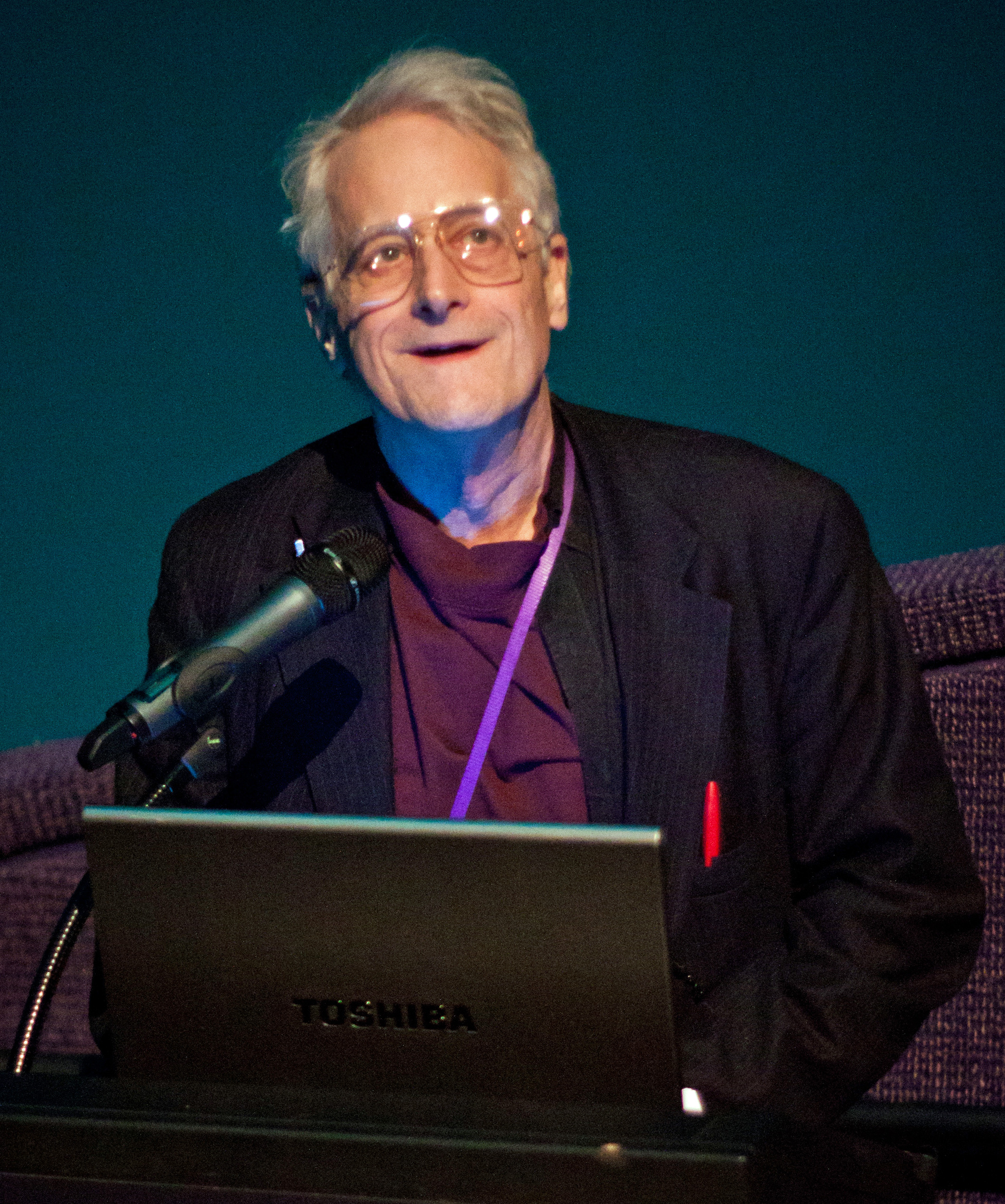
- Nelson in 2011
- Born: June 17, 1937 (age 89); Chicago, Illinois, U.S.
- Education: Swarthmore College (BA); University of Chicago; Harvard University (MA); Keio University (PhD)
- Known for: Hypertext
- Parent(s): Ralph Nelson, Celeste Holm
- Scientific career
- Fields: Information technology, philosophy, and sociology
- Workplaces: Project Xanadu

Theodor Holm Nelson (born June 17, 1937) is an American pioneer of information technology, philosopher of computer science, and sociologist. He coined the terms hypertext and hypermedia in 1963 and published them in 1965. According to his profile published in Forbes in 1997, Nelson "sees himself as a literary romantic, like a Cyrano de Bergerac, or 'the Orson Welles of software'."

== Early life and education ==
Nelson is the son of Emmy Award–winning director Ralph Nelson and Academy Award‍–‍winning actress Celeste Holm. His parents' marriage was brief and he was mostly raised by his grandparents, first in Chicago and later in Greenwich Village.

Nelson earned a B.A. in philosophy from Swarthmore College in 1959. Following a year of graduate study in sociology at the University of Chicago, Nelson began graduate work in Social Relations, then a department at Harvard University, specializing in sociology, and ultimately earned a M.A in sociology from the Department of Social Relations in 1962. After Harvard, Nelson worked as a photographer and filmmaker for a year at John C. Lilly's Communication Research Institute in Miami, Florida, where he briefly shared an office with Gregory Bateson. From 1964 to 1966, he was an instructor in sociology at Vassar College.

During college and graduate school, Nelson began to envision a computer-based writing system that would provide a lasting repository for the world's knowledge, and also permit greater flexibility of drawing connections between ideas. This came to be known as Project Xanadu.

Much later in life, in 2002, Nelson obtained his PhD in media and governance from Keio University.

== Project Xanadu ==
Nelson first conceived of what would become Project Xanadu in the early 1960s, with the goal of creating a computer network with a simple user interface. He started referring to this project to others using the name Xanadu in 1966. The effort is documented in the books Computer Lib/Dream Machines (1974), The Home Computer Revolution (1977) and Literary Machines (1981). Much of his adult life has been devoted to working on Xanadu and advocating for it.

Throughout his career, Nelson supported his work on the Xanadu project through a variety of administrative, academic, and research positions and consultancies, including stints at Harcourt Brace and Company Brown University (a tumultuous consultancy on the Nelson-inspired Hypertext Editing System and File Retrieval and Editing System with Swarthmore friend Andries van Dam's group; c. 1967–1969), Bell Labs (hypertext-related defense research; 1968–1969), CBS Laboratories ("writing and photographing interactive slideshows for their AVS-10 instructional device"; 1968–1969), the University of Illinois at Chicago (an interdisciplinary staff position; 1973–1976) and Swarthmore College (visiting lecturer in computing; 1977).

From 1980 to 1981, he was the editor of Creative Computing. At the behest of Xanadu developers Mark S. Miller and Stuart Greene, Nelson joined San Antonio, Texas-based Datapoint as chief software designer (1981–1982), remaining with the company as a media specialist and technical writer until its Asher Edelman-driven restructuring in 1984. Following several San Antonio-based consultancies and the acquisition of Xanadu technology by Autodesk in 1988, he continued working on the project as a non-managerial Distinguished Fellow in the San Francisco Bay Area until the divestiture of the Xanadu Operating Group in 1992–1993.

After holding visiting professorships in media and information science at Hokkaido University (1995–1996), Keio University (1996–2002), the University of Southampton and the University of Nottingham, he was a fellow (2004–2006) and visiting fellow (2006–2008) of the Oxford Internet Institute in conjunction with Wadham College, Oxford. More recently, he has taught classes at Chapman University and the University of California, Santa Cruz.

The Xanadu project failed to flourish, for a variety of reasons which are disputed. Journalist Gary Wolf published an unflattering history of Nelson and his project in the June 1995 issue of Wired, calling it "the longest-running vaporware project in the history of computing". On his own website, Nelson expressed his disgust with the criticisms, referring to Wolf as "Gory Jackal", and threatened to sue him. He also outlined his objections in a letter to Wired, and released a detailed rebuttal of the article.

As early as 1972, a demonstration iteration developed by Cal Daniels failed to reach fruition when Nelson was forced to return the project's rented Data General Nova minicomputer due to financial exigencies. Nelson has stated that some aspects of his vision were fulfilled by Tim Berners-Lee's invention of the World Wide Web, but he disliked the World Wide Web, XML, and embedded markup – regarding Berners-Lee's work as a gross over-simplification of his original vision:

HTML is precisely what we were trying to PREVENT— ever-breaking links, links going outward only, quotes you can't follow to their origins, no version management, no rights management.

Jaron Lanier explained the difference between the World Wide Web and Nelson's vision, and the implications:

A core technical difference between a Nelsonian network and what we have become familiar with online is that [Nelson's] network links were two-way instead of one-way. In a network with two-way links, each node knows what other nodes are linked to it. ... Two-way linking would preserve context. It's a small simple change in how online information should be stored that couldn't have vaster implications for culture and the economy.

== Other projects ==
In 1957, Nelson co-wrote and co-produced what he describes as a pioneering rock musical entitled "Anything and Everything"; it was performed at Swarthmore College. Two years later, during his senior year at Swarthmore, Nelson made an experimental humorous student film, The Epiphany of Slocum Furlow, in which the titular hero discovers the meaning of life. Musician and composer Peter Schickele, also a student at Swarthmore College, scored the film.

In 1965, Nelson presented the paper "Complex Information Processing: A File Structure for the Complex, the Changing, and the Indeterminate" at the ACM National Conference, in which he coined the term "hypertext".

In 1976, Nelson co-founded and briefly served as the advertising director of the "itty bitty machine company", or "ibm", a small computer retail store that operated from 1976 to 1980 in Evanston, Illinois. In 1978, he had a significant impact upon IBM's thinking when he outlined his vision of the potential of personal computing to the team that three years later launched the IBM PC.

From the 1960s to the mid-2000s, Nelson built an extensive collection of direct advertising mail he received in his mailbox, mainly from companies selling products in IT, print/publishing, aerospace, and engineering. In 2017, the Internet Archive began to publish it online in scanned form, in a collection titled "Ted Nelson's Junk Mail Cartons".

== ZigZag ==
As of 2011, Nelson was working on a new information structure, ZigZag, which is described on the Xanadu project website, which also hosts two versions of the Xanadu code. He also developed XanaduSpace, a system for the exploration of connected parallel documents (an early version of this software may be freely downloaded).

== Influence and recognition ==
In January 1988 Byte magazine published an article about Nelson's ideas, titled "Managing Immense Storage".

In 1998, at the Seventh WWW Conference in Brisbane, Australia, Nelson was awarded the Yuri Rubinsky Memorial Award.

In 2001, he was knighted by France as Officier des Arts et Lettres. In 2007, he celebrated his 70th birthday by giving an invited lecture at the University of Southampton. In 2014, ACM SIGCHI honored him with a Special Recognition Award.

In 2014, Nelson was conferred with a Doctor of Science degree, honoris causa, by Chapman University. The ceremony took place during the 'Intertwingled' conference, featuring Nelson and other prominent figures in the field, including Apple Computer founder Steve Wozniak and former Association for Computing Machinery president Wendy Hall. At the conference, Nelson stated confidence in the potential of his Xanadu system, saying 'The world would have been a better place if I had succeeded, but I ain't dead yet.'

Nelson's work is mentioned in the 1998 psychological anime Serial Experiments Lain.

=== Neologisms ===
Nelson is credited with coining several new words that have come into common usage especially in the world of computing. Among them are:

- hypertext and hypermedia in 1963 and first published in 1965
- transclusion
- docuverse
- micropayment
- stretchtext
- virtuality
- intertwingularity
- teledildonics (devised by Nelson in 1975 before its later popularization by Howard Rheingold)

== Publications ==
Nelson publishes some of his books through his self-owned Mindful Press.

- Life, Love, College, etc. (1959)
- Computer Lib/Dream Machines: New freedoms through computer screens—a minority report (1974), Microsoft Press, revised edition 1987 with foreword by Stewart Brand: ISBN 0-914845-49-7
- The Home Computer Revolution (1977)
- Literary Machines: The report on, and of, Project Xanadu concerning word processing, electronic publishing, hypertext, thinkertoys, tomorrow's intellectual revolution, and certain other topics including knowledge, education and freedom (1981), Mindful Press; publication dates as listed in the 93.1 (1993) edition: 1980–84, 1987, 1990–93
- The Future of Information (1997)
- "A Cosmology for a Different Computer Universe: Data Model, Mechanisms, Virtual Machine and Visualization Infrastructure". Journal of Digital Information. 5 (1). Southampton, UK: British Computing Society. January 4, 2004. ISSN 1368-7506.
- Geeks Bearing Gifts: How The Computer World Got This Way (2008; Chapter summaries)
- POSSIPLEX: Movies, Intellect, Creative Control, My Computer Life and the Fight for Civilization (2010), autobiography, Mindful Press.

== Filmography ==
=== Early works ===
- The Epiphany of Slocum Furlow (1959) – experimental student film made at Swarthmore College, scored by Peter Schickele

=== Lectures and presentations ===
- "TEDtalk by TED at the TED2 Conference" (1990)
- "Here I Stand, at Age 80" (2017) – 80th birthday presentation at the Internet Archive

=== Computers for Cynics series ===
A series of short documentaries published on YouTube beginning in 2012:

1. "The Myth of Technology"
2. "It All Went Wrong at Xerox PARC"
3. "The Database Mess"
4. "Personal Computing – the Dance of Apple and Microsoft"
5. "Hyperhistory"
6. "The Real Story of the World Wide Web"
7. "How Bitcoin Actually Works"
8. "Closure: Pay Attention to the Man Behind the Curtain"

=== Other notable videos ===
- "I Think I Know Who Satoshi Is" (2014)
- "The Jackal's Curse: A Feature-Length Reply to 'The Curse of Xanadu'" (2019) – response to Gary Wolf's 1995 Wired article
