= Victory Garden (novel) =

Novel by Stuart Moulthrop

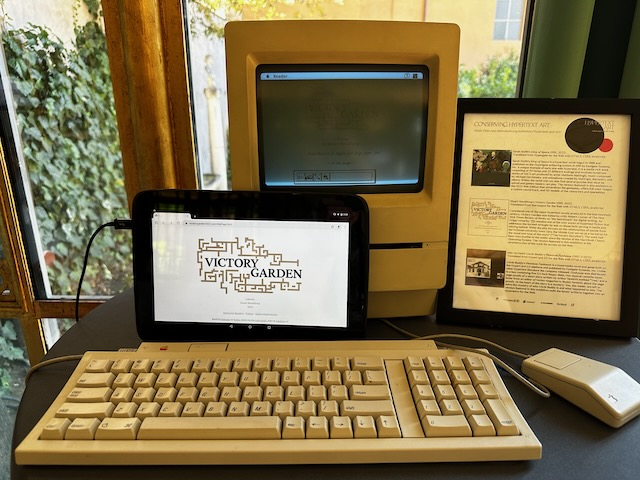
- "Victory Garden" exhibited at ACM Hypertext 2023 running on a Macintosh from the 1990s with an iPad running a recreated version from 2022.
- Author: Stuart Moulthrop
- Genre: Hypertext fiction
- Publisher: Eastgate Systems
- Publication date: 1991 (Eastgate), 2022 (ELL)
- Publication place: USA

Victory Garden is a work of electronic literature by American author Stuart Moulthrop. It was written in Storyspace and first published by Eastgate Systems in 1991. Victory Garden is one of the earliest examples of hypertext novels, and is notable for being very inventive and influential in its genre. It is often discussed along with Michael Joyce's afternoon, a story as an important work of hypertext fiction.

== Structure ==
Victory Garden is a hypertext novel set during the Gulf War in 1991. The story centers on Emily Runbird and the lives and interactions of the people connected with her life. Although Emily is a central figure to the story and networked lives of the characters, there is no one character who could be classed as the protagonist. Each character in Victory Garden lends their own sense of perspective to the story and all characters are linked through a series of bridges and connections.

The work is large, containing over 933 lexias (nodes) and 2,804 different links. The work integrates maps and images as navigational aids through the text. In the 1993 New York Times Book Review, "Hyperfiction: Novels for the Computer," Robert Coover, explained that the paths readers can take through the work are "almost literally countless."

There is no set "end" to the story. Rather there are multiple nodes that provide a sense of closure for the reader. In one such "ending", Emily appears to die. However, in another "ending", she comes home safe from the war. How the story plays out depends on the choices the reader makes during their navigation of the text. The passage of time is uncertain as the reader can find nodes that focus on the present, flashbacks or even dreams and the nodes are frequently presented in a non-linear fashion. The choices the reader makes can lead them to focus on individual characters, meaning that while there are a series of characters in the story the characters focused on can change with each reading, or a particular place.

Upon entering the work the reader is presented with a series of choices as to how to navigate the story, that J. Yellowlees Douglas explains is similar to a table of contents ("Places to Be", Paths to Explore", and "Paths to Deplore"). The reader may also enter the text through many other ways: the acknowledgements page, the directions "Welcome" (which leads to a description of the work in "The Place of the Big Wind"), and the map of the 'garden', the lists of paths, or by text links. Each of these paths guides the reader though fragmented pieces of the story (in the form of nodes) and by reading and rereading many different paths the reader receives different perspectives of the different characters. The work has six different "points of closure" which could be interpreted as endings.

== Characters and storylines ==
There are many recurring characters in Victory Garden, including Harley, Boris Urquhart, Veronica, Leroy, and others, such as Jude Busch, who has mental illness and attempts to seduce Victor Gardner to heal herself. Victor Gardner loves Emily Runbird, who may or may not have been killed in the Gulf War. Jude attempts to connect herself with Victor Gardner and Emily.

Thea Agnew works at a university in the town of Tara. Thea's rebellious teenage son, Leroy, is going to visit her. Leroy has recently left school to take his own "On the Road" tour of the United States. Leroy is also a virtual reality artist. As the head of a Curriculum Revision Committee, Thea is examining Western civilization as a subject. Thea, along with a group of friends, discovers that a popular local creek has been sold to a company intending to build a golf course nearby. One of the pivotal scenes in Victory Garden occurs at Thea's house. During a party an appearance from Uqbari the Prophet leads to a gun being fired off in Thea's backyard, which results in the intervention of police and Harley's accidental beating.

Emily and her younger sister Veronica are Thea's pupils. Emily has been through law school, and she has an older brother. Emily is involved in the Gulf War and may be behind the lines or may be killed.

Readers learn various facts about Emily in different nodes, for example:

- Emily is with Boris but may have had something with the Victor? [Dear Victor]
- Emily has been with Boris for 3 years, losing love for him? [No genius]
- Emily’s surname is Runbird [a true story]
- Emily is reading “Blood and Guts in High Schools” which Boris sent her [blood & guts in S.A.]
- Flashes back to a morning with Boris, hints towards an event earlier on in their relationship, Boris has facial hair, Emily is undecided on whether she likes it or not [Facial hair]
- Same morning, a little later on, Emily doesn’t approve of the facial hair, thinks of it as false advertising [face it]
- Back to current time, Emily is writing to Boris, Thea is depressed, Veronica needs to pay the car insurance. Boris is expected to have bought a new bed [Dear you]

== Politics ==
According to David Ciccoricco, "Although some early critics were quick to see Victory Garden as rooted in a leftist political ideology, Moulthrop's narrative is not unequivocally leftist. Its political orientation in a sense mirrors its material structure, for neither sits on a stable axis. In fact, Moulthrop is more interested in questioning how a palette of information technologies contributes to—or, for those who adopt the strong reading, determines—the formation of political ideologies. In addition to popular forms of information dissemination, this palette would include hypertext technology, which reflexively questions its own role in disseminating information as the narrative of Victory Garden progresses."

Citing Sven Birkerts' observation that attitudes toward information technologies do not map neatly onto the familiar liberal/conservative axis, Moulthrop writes:

Newt Gingrich and Timothy Leary have both been advocates of the Internet... I am interested less in old ideological positions than in those now emerging, which may be defined more by attitudes toward information and interpretive authority than by traditional political concerns. (Moulthrop 1997, 674 n4)

The politics of Victory Garden, much like its plot, do not harbor foregone conclusions. In a 1994 interview, Moulthrop says it "is a story about war and the futility of war, and about its nobility at the same time" (Dunn 1994).

== Critical reception ==
The original version has been the subject of over a hundred analyses in books, essays, theses, and dissertations over its three-decade history. As a work of hypertext fiction, Victory Garden has been discussed and analyzed by many critics, including Robert Coover (1993 and 1998), Silvio Gaggi (1999), Raine Koskimaa (2000), James Phelan and E. Maloney (2000), Robert Selig (2000), David Ciccoricco (2007), and Astrid Ensslin (2021).

== Publication history ==
Victory Garden was originally published by Eastgate Systems in 1991 in StorySpace.

Washington State University at Vancouver's Electronic Literature Laboratory and The NEXT Museum, Library, and Preservation Space emulated this work in 2022 using javascript and HTML.
