= Netprov =

Networked, improvised literature written collaboratively on the internet

- Features: Networked, improvised literature

Related genres
- Hypertext fiction, Blog fiction, Interactive fiction, Digital poetry, Computer-generated literature, Cell phone novels, Instapoetry, Cybertext, Creepypasta, Fan fiction

Netprov is "networked, improvised literature" or collaborative literary improvisations performed on the internet. The word netprov is a portmanteau of "networked" and "improv" as in improvisational theatre. Netprov is considered a genre of electronic literature.

== Background ==
Netprov is explicitly related to improvisational theatre, and also has a lot in common with live action role-playing games.

Netprov has its roots in the early days of computers. Rob Wittig, one of netprov's originators, was also involved in Invisible Seattle, a novel created in the early 1980s by a group of "literary workers" who gathered stories from Seattle residents, in part using an early online bulletin board system.

An early example of netprov was Rob Wittig's Grace, Wit, and Charm (2011), which centered around a fictional company that offered services to people who wanted help making their online avatars more successful. Participants took the roles of workers in the company and clients writing in to request services, and the netprov was performed in online writing, in weekly theatre performances and streaming.

While many netprovs are mostly playful, like #1WkNoTech, some offer powerful political critique, such as Occupy MLA, a netprov held during the Modern Language Association conference in 2011. I Work for the Web is another example that critiques the exploitation of online gig workers.

== Scholarship ==
Netprov is included in many discussions of electronic literature. Lyle Skains describes netprov as "online, collaborative, real-time, carnivalesque performances". Scott Rettberg notes that netprov is told in real-time, using social media, and are collaborative and interactive in the sense that readers can join in as participants.

Wittig and Marino have also contributed chapters about netprov to a number of scholarly anthologies on electronic literature.

Netprovs have also been taught at universities, both as a literary genre and as a classroom activity.

The NEXT Museum, Archive, and Preservation Space has collections of netprov.
