= I mellom tiden =

2002 work by Anne Bang-Steinsvik

- Author: Anne Bang-Steinsvik
- Language: Norwegian, Bokmål
- Genre: electronic literature, hypertext fiction
- Publication date: 2002
- Website: http://imellomtiden.no

I mellom tiden (in English: Between time) is a Norwegian work of electronic literature or interactive visual poetry by Anne Bang-Steinsvik. It was first published in 2002.

== About the work ==
I mellom tiden is a multimodal hypertext fiction, using text, images, video, music and voiceover, with four main sections: "Friends", "Lovers", "Family" and "Alone". Hans Kristian Rustad describes the work as exploring a longing for the past through images and memories, where the longing is characterised by an absence of time. The style of writing and the thematics connects the work to lyrical poetry, and the paratextual statement that the work was funded by Arts Council Norway confirms its claim to being poetic. Words are animated, in the style of kinetic poetry.

Technically, the work was developed using Adobe Flash and published on a website, using HTML and Quicktime.

Anne Bang-Steinsvik is also a visual artist.

== Reception ==
Hans Kristian Rustad analysed the work extensively in several articles, and called it innovative, writing that it pushed the genre of hypertext forwards. His research on the use of sound in I mellom tiden has been particularly praised. The work was also analysed by Melissa Lucas in her dissertation on Nordic electronic literature.
