= 34 North 118 West =

Early locative hypertext

34 North 118 West by Jeff Knowlton, Naomi Spellman, and Jeremy Hight and Narration by Zoey Goetsch, is one of the first locative hypertexts. Published in 2003, the work connected Global Positioning System (GPS) data with a fictional narrative on an early tablet PC connected to Global Positioning devices to deliver a real-time story to a user.

== Plot and structure ==
=== Setting ===
The work is set in a freight depot and warehouse in downtown Los Angeles. The time spans the early 1900s when innovations were telegraphs and radio to the time of the work where innovations are the internet and GPS. Astrid Ensslin and Alice Bell examine 34 North 118 West and explain that it works in a city street in Los Angeles. As readers follow an interactive map in the city, they access fragments of the story. Bell and Ensslin explain that the work asks "listeners to imagine fictional stories alongside their current physical location in the actual world."

=== Maps and GPS ===
Historical maps were based on Sanborn Fire Insurance maps from the historical time period. A contemporary journal, American Cultural Resources Association Newsletter (February 2004) calls this a "real-space museum" and explained that walking the actual current streets with this work allowed readers to experience the past in innovative ways.

== Critical reception and literary significance ==
In his 2006 critical study, Hypertext 3.0, George Landow analyzed this work as a first example of "narrative archaeology" and used this to analyze the role of narrative in augmented reality. "Hight wants to use his augmented reality to create something radically different by making the augmentation occur in the same place and time as the everyday physical world."

This work was shown at the LA Freewaves Festival and the Art in Motion Festival, according to the original website. A contemporary journal, American Cultural Resources Association Newsletter (February 2004) calls 34 North 118 West a "real-space museum" and explained that walking the actual current streets with this work allowed readers to experience the past in innovative ways.

This seminal work helped pave the way for locative fiction works and software. The work is one of the first to use GPS to serve content to readers. Users walk the city and listen to portions of the story that are delivered based on their GPS positions. NOEMA, a journal that reviews electronic work, described this work as "a marriage of high-tech and story telling that uses a GPS device, tablet PC and custom software to determine the viewers and deliver story components based on the users’ location." GPS Museum noted that this early locative work is one of the first that used walking around in a physical setting and experiencing a digital work.

Scott Rettberg explains that this early hyperfiction paved the way for locative works and the programming prefigured software tools to create further works that merged physical locations with digital stories. In a 2020 interview with Molly Hankwitz, Jeremy Hight explained that this technology could "let places and history speak and potentially skin the world with stories: things not possible on paper".

In an analysis of the poetic possibilities in digital media, Markku Eskelinen uses this work as an example of ergodic texts as defined by Espen Aarseth. Eskelinen goes on to note that these works require users to use their bodies in ways that interact with the text, thus demanding more of a reader than merely interpreting text and writing.

== See also ==
- Hypertext fiction
- Location-based game
- Locative media
- Urban informatics
