= Anne Bang-Steinsvik =

Norwegian artist and author

Anne Bang-Steinsvik is a Norwegian visual artist and author, born in 1958. Her artistic practice includes painting, electronic literature and hypertext, and video performance art.

Bang-Steinsvik was an early experimenter with internet art and electronic literature. She is also the author of I mellom tiden, a multimodal lyrical hypertext work from 2002 that has been analysed both as an early work of Norwegian electronic literature and for its innovative use of sound in poetry. She also published the work Touch Sensitive in 1998.

Kjersti Sundland and Anne Bang-Steinsvik collaborated as the artist duo Undersentralen. One of their performances was Little Monstrous Women, which was a video performance piece involving projections on three screens showing snippets from horror movies, using repetitive sample of women and girls to problematise gender performativity.

One of her paintings is in the collection of the National Museum of Norway.
