= I Have Said Nothing =

"I Have Said Nothing" is an early work of hypertext fiction written by J. Yellowlees Douglas. In 1993 it was published by Eastgate Systems, Inc. in The Eastgate Quarterly Review of Hypertext (Winter 1994, volume 1 number 2), along with “Lust” by Mary-Kim Arnold. In 1997, Norton Anthology published an online (albeit truncated) version of the work, along with Michael Joyce's afternoon, a story as part of its print publication Norton Anthology of Postmodern American Fiction.

The plot of "I Have Said Nothing" involves two fatal car crashes. Two girlfriends of the narrator's brother are killed at different points in time. The lexia (text fragments) in the hypertext explore both the causal chains leading to the tragic events and the fragmentation of thought and feeling in the emotional lives of those involved. Designed in Storyspace, the work offers readers a variety of strategies for the navigation of lexia: a cognitive map, links in the text, a default narrative line, and a navigation menu of available paths. If the reader, following a series of chronological strands, arrives at a lexia entitled “The End”, she may "consult the text’s cognitive map and "discover “The End” nestled near the map’s central point." The cognitive map, shaped like two inverted pyramids with "the end" occupying the middle region, indicates to the reader where they are in the story-world and how much they might still be missing. About the narrative structure, Douglas has written "I had a vague ... conviction that causality is the root of all narratives: like E. M. Forster in Aspects of the Novel, I believed that you could rip everything else to shreds as long as you kept something that resembled cause and effect pumping away beneath the surface, you could keep just about any amorphous blob going."

Hypertext author Stuart Moulthrop called the work "superb...finely balanced between savagery and sympathy."
