= Lexia =

Lexia may refer to:

- Lexia (typeface)
- Lexia, Western Australia
- Lexia (hypertext)
- Lexia Learning, a division of Cambium Learning Group

== See also ==
- Lexias (archdukes), a genus of tropical forest-dwelling butterflies
