= Stochastic Texts =

- Author: Theo Lutz
- Language: German
- Genre: generative literature
- Publication date: 1959

Stochastic Texts (German: Stochastische Texte) is a poetry generator written in 1959 by the German computer scientist Theo Lutz. It is one of the earliest examples of electronic literature.

== About the work ==
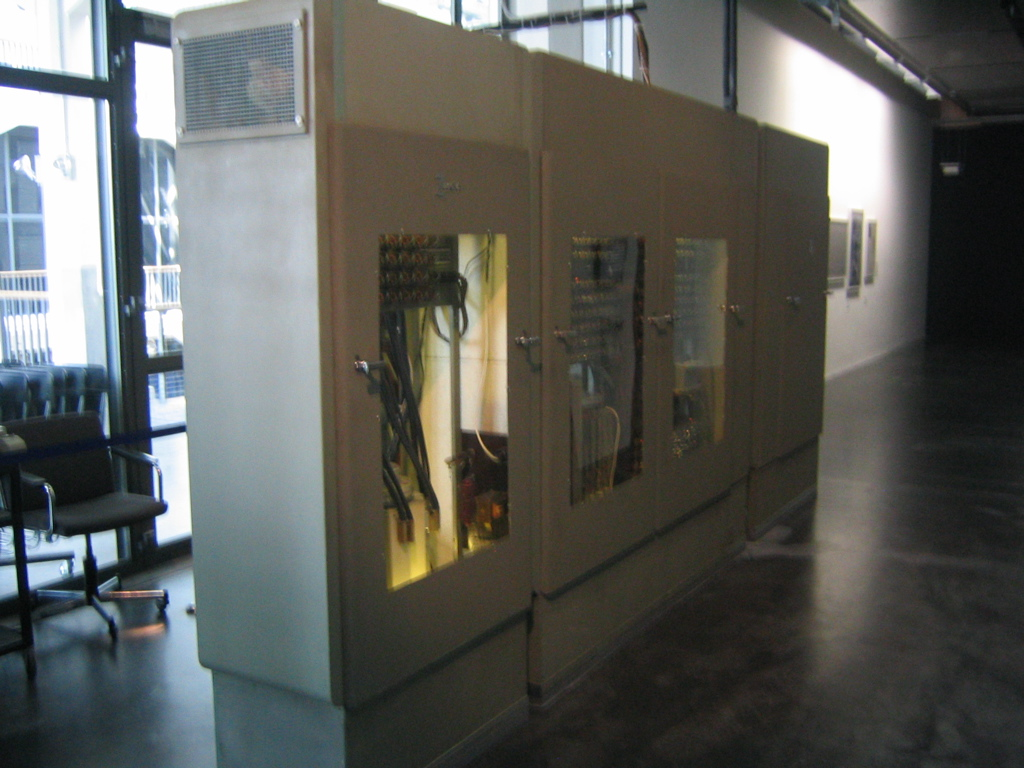
Stochastic Texts was written for the Zuse Z22 computer, a German mainframe introduced in 1956.

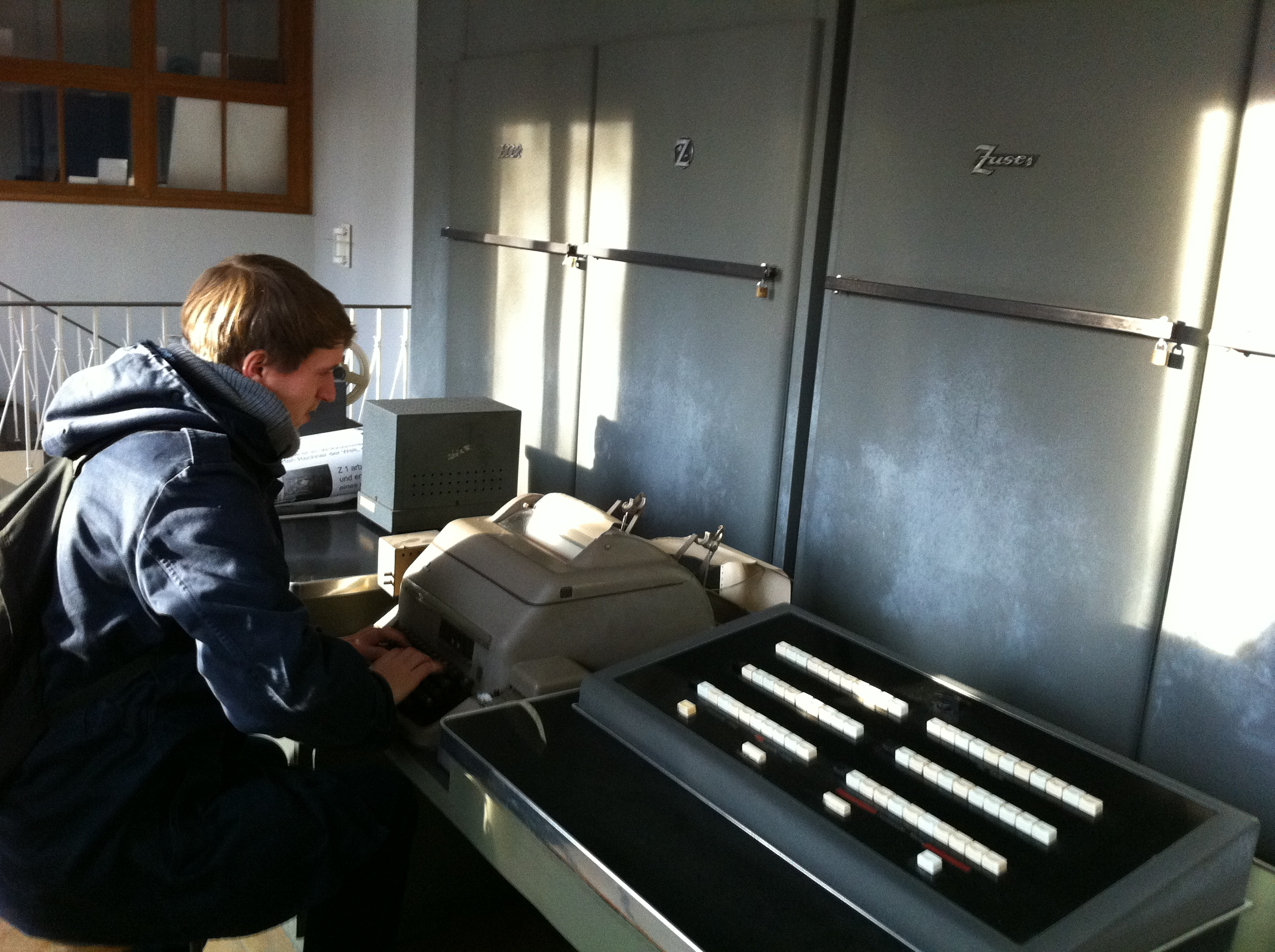
The Z22 was programmed using a teletype terminal. The computer did not have a screen, and the poems were printed out.

In 1959 the German computer scientist Theo Lutz wrote Stochastic Texts, which "for many years was considered the first digital literary text." Stochastic Texts was a program written for a Z22 computer that "produced random short sentences based on a corpus of chapter titles and subjects from Franz Kafka's novel The Castle.

Nick Montfort has reimplemented the work in Python, with words translated into English by Helen MacCormack, and the work can be viewed in a web browser. Each line combines words differently, for example as follows:

Not every count is good. No eye is deep.
No way is good therefore every house is good.
Every church is quiet or not every house is strong.
Not every tower is good. Every stranger is good.
Not every picture is old. No farmer is open.
A look is large or no guest is silent.
A day is quiet. No table is old.

— Theo Lutz, Stochastic Texts, Reimplementated by Nick Montfort

== Reception ==
Lutz's work has been discussed both as a very early work of electronic literature and as an important precursor to current AI-generated literature. The German philosopher and media scholar Hannes Bajohr writes that Stochastic Texts is an example of the "sequential paradigm" in generative literature, in opposition to newer examples of a "connectionist paradigm": "Instead of hoping to recreate intuition, genius, or expression, the logic of the machine itself – that is, the logic of deterministically executed rule steps – becomes aesthetically normative in Stochastische Texte."
