= Six Sex Scenes =

1996 hypertext novella by Adrienne Eisen

Six sex scenes: a novella in hypertext
- Cover page of Six Sex Scenes.
- Author: Adrienne Eisen
- Language: English
- Genre: Hypertext fiction, Electronic literature
- Publication date: 1996
- Publication place: United States
- Website: https://web.archive.org/web/20010603003944/http://www.altx.com/hyperx/sss/

Six Sex Scenes is a hypertext novella created by Adrienne Eisen and published on the web in 1996.

== Content and form ==
Six Sex Scenes is a first-person narrative told from the perspective of a young woman. It has been described as "the story of a young Jewish woman's dysfunctional love-life, with frequent flashbacks into her equally dysfunctional childhood".

As an electronic literature piece, Six Sex Scenes consists of many lexias: individual webpages with a few paragraphs of the story. While some contemporaneous web hypertext fictions used in-text hyperlinks, Six Sex Scenes presented the links at the bottom of each screen. Each lexia has three or four links to other lexias, allowing the reader to read the story in many different orders: "a menu of options at the end of each story-section. This menu is actually a contents-list for the story's next stage. If we clicked on a link that says ‘Bored’, we will find ourselves reading a section entitled ‘Bored’: so in a sense, although we may be unclear about the shape of the story as a whole, we are shown at the end of each section, in a relatively straightforward way, where we can go next". This means that Eisen "allows us to read a section all the way through before reminding us that there are multiple choices to be made".

Mark Bernstein (Eastgate Systems) writes that Six Sex Scenes uses counterpoint structure and avoids the cyclical structure common in many other hypertexts. Adrian Miles described the episodes as "largely unmotivated in terms of realist or literal narrative conventions," although Bernstein noted that the counterpoint structure emphasised contrasts or links between childhood and adult experiences: "Greenheart’s hypertext habitually alternates time frames: a writing space describing a childhood scene tends to be linked to scenes of adult life, and adult scenes tend to be linked to stories of childhood."

== Reception ==
Six Sex Scenes was one of the winners of the New Media Invision Awards in 1997.

A sequel titled Making Scenes was published as a print novel in 2001.
