= The Impermanence Agent =

The Impermanence Agent (1998 - 2002) was an electronic literature piece that provided a web agent that used each user's browsers to present a story based on that browsing. Noah Wardrip-Fruin, Brion Moss, a.c. chapman, and Duane Whitehurst created this work in 1998.

== Description ==
The agent added a small browser window to display the original story. When users browsed, the window would add details gained from each page to which the users went. However, the agent also alters the pages that the user browses. Nick Montfort gives the example that a funeral image might appear in The New York Times.

Noah Wardrip-Fruin, one of the authors, explains that "The browser is approached as a daily computer tool, in which the artwork becomes part of the daily browsing experience."

== Publications, exhibitions, and education ==
The agent was first in the 1998 project "Omnizone: Mapping Perspectives of Digital Culture," organized by Plexus International. Later versions were published and exhibited in School of Visual Arts (SVA)'s New York Digital Salon, the New Museum's Z Media Lounge, and the Guggenheim Museum's Brave New Word.

After the initial agent was ended in 2002, a new version, The Agent's Story, was developed for the Whitney Museum's Airport. This new edition featured stories developed from featured browsers, including Stuart Moulthrop, Nick Montfort, Jullia Flanders, and Joseph Tabbi.

The work was shown at ACMSIGGRAPH.

Raine Koskimaa described ways to incorporate the Agent into digital literature studies.
