= 1WkNoTech =

2014 netprov

#1WkNoTech
- Author: Mark Marino and Rob Wittig
- Language: English
- Genre: Web fiction, Netprov, Electronic literature
- Publication date: 2014
- Publication place: US

#1WkNoTech was a netprov run in 2014 and 2015, led by Mark Marino and Rob Wittig.

== Content ==
Participants "pretended to use no technology for a week and documented the 'experiment' obsessively in social media". Participants used Twitter, a fictional organisational website, a fictional Facebook page and private google docs to organise the storytelling.

#1WkNoTech has been described as a parody of "a situation that often occurs on social media where a Facebook or Twitter user loudly declares that they have had enough of the information overload and are going offline for a while to recuperate". Instead of going offline, the participants of #1WkNoTech spend time on the very sites they have disavowed. The netprov was well-suited for "partial reading" since its aesthetic experience depended on the mass of tweets rather than a particular storyline.
