= Prehistoric Digital Poetry =

2007 book about early digital poetry by C. T. Funkhouser

Prehistoric Digital Poetry: An Archaeology of Forms, 1959–1995
- Author: C. T. Funkouser
- Language: English
- Subject: History of digital poetry
- Genre: Non-fiction, literary criticism
- Publisher: University of Alabama Press
- Publication date: 2007
- Media type: Hardcover, paperback, ebook
- Pages: 408
- ISBN: 0-8173-5422-0

Prehistoric Digital Poetry: An Archaeology of Forms, 1959–1995 is a nonfiction book by C. T. Funkhouser. It provides documentation and literary criticism of early forms of electronic literature and digital poetry, many of which are no longer accessible. It was published in 2007 by the University of Alabama Press, Tuscaloosa, Alabama, United States.

== Structure ==
Christoper Thompson Funkhouser's book is divided into five distinct sections: Introduction, Origination, Visual and Kinetic Design Poems, Hypertext and Hypermedia, Alternative Arrangements, Techniques Enabled. There are also two Appendices (Appendix A, and Appendix B), as well as Acknowledgments and text Notes.

The Introduction to the book deals largely in generalities, seeking to lay out a basic definition and conception of digital poetry before moving into the examination of individual digital works. Here Funkhouser also deals with critiques and alternate definitions of digital poetry from writers and theorists other than himself.

The Origins section gives a detailed account of the progression of digital poetry from early computer experiments and tests, performed by a select few individuals, into the earliest forms of computer permutation writing and text generation.

Visual and Kinetic Design Poems deals primarily with works built on font and text formatting. He provides a number of examples similar to the concrete poets of the first half of the 20th century, along with discussions of typology and text manipulation.

The Hypertext and Hypermedia chapter of the book deals primarily with text and media links and their integration into digital poetics.

Alternative Arrangements is an examination of internet writing collectives and communities built around computer networks.

The final chapter of the book entitled Techniques Enabled focuses primarily on the ways in which technology can be advanced purely for the sake of digital poetry. That is to say the last chapter of the book discusses the ways in which digital poets are developing new software and pushing the limits of their computers' functionality in search of new forms of technological expression.

== Reception ==
Prehistoric Digital Poetry received generally positive reviews, with reviewers emphasising the value of its documentation of already-lost works of electronic literature. Jed Rasula calls it an "immensely informative study". Alan Golding writes that it "lays out in usefully illustrated detail the early history of com- puter poems and their connections to “precomputerized poetry”, using the arrival of the World Wide Web as its cutoff point." Stephanie Boluk writes that the book's documentation of works that are almost forgotten and may soon only be documented through the screenshots in this book is both sad and of great value, and that the book "conveys that it is not only technologies, but also theoretical constructs that have an accelerated obsolescence in the field of digital literature."
