= Adriana de Souza e Silva =

Brazilian/American communication professor

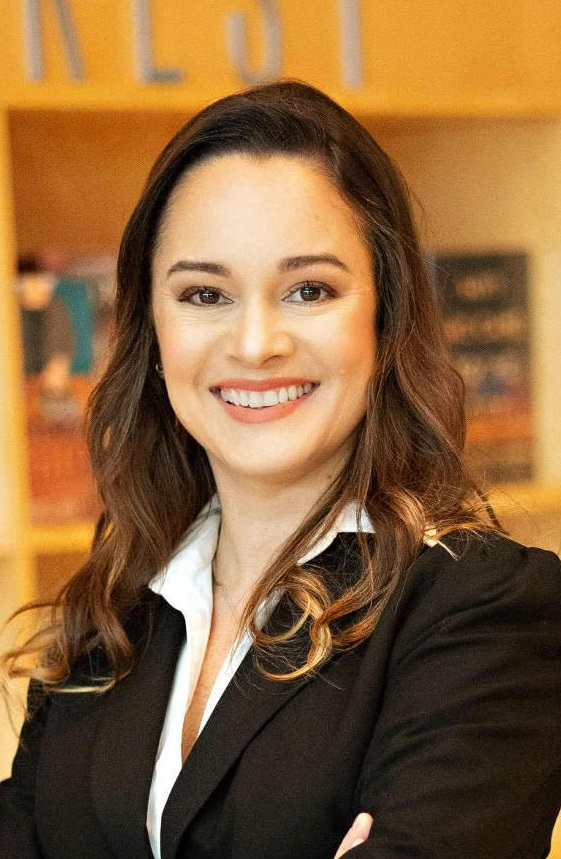
- Born: Brazil
- Occupations: Communication professor, information technologist, author, and academic

Academic background
- Education: B.A. in Journalism, Social Communication; M.A. in Communication and Image Technology; PhD in Communication and Culture; Federal University of Rio de Janeiro (UFRJ/Brazil)
- Thesis: From Multiuser Environments as (Virtual) Spaces to (Hybrid) Spaces as Multiuser Environments: Understanding nomadic technology devices and hybrid communication places (2004)

Academic work
- Institutions: Northeastern University, North Carolina State University
- Website: souzaesilva.com

Adriana de Souza e Silva is a Brazilian/American media studies scholar and the author of several books on mobile communication, mobile art, and location-based games. She is a Communication Studies Professor and Director of the Center for Transformative Media at the College of Arts, Media and Design (CAMD) at Northeastern University.

de Souza e Silva's research interest spans the fields of mobile communication and networked urban mobilities, with a particular focus on the socio-economic inequalities, power imbalances, and access issues in the Global South.

de Souza e Silva is a senior editor of Mobile Media & Communication and Chair of the International Communication Association (ICA) Mobile Communication Division.

== Education ==
In 1996, de Souza e Silva graduated from the Federal University of Rio de Janeiro, with a Bachelor of Arts in journalism and social communication. Her capstone project was titled Functional Design in Brazil: An [sic] European Solution, or a Non-Solution?. Subsequently, she pursued a master's degree in the field of Communication and Image Technology, within a thesis titled Design as Interface of Contemporary Times. She received a Ph.D. from the same institution in 2004, with her dissertation entitled From Multiuser Environments as (Virtual) Spaces to (Hybrid) Spaces as Multiuser Environments: Understanding Nomadic Technology Devices and Hybrid Communication Places.

== Career ==
In 1999, de Souza e Silva was a Graphic Designer for the VIP magazine (Editora Abril) in São Paulo, Brazil. She then transitioned to academia and was a Visiting Scholar in the Department of Design, Media Arts at the University of California, Los Angeles (UCLA). In 2005, she was appointed as an assistant professor of communication at North Carolina State University (NCSU), and in 2010, she was an associate professor of Digital Culture and Mobile Communication at the IT University of Copenhagen in Denmark.

de Souza e Silva was the Director of the Communication Rhetoric and Digital Media (CRDM) Ph.D. Program at NCSU and the Director of the Network Mobilities Lab (NML) at the same institution.

== Research ==
de Souza e Silva's research expertise is in the field of communication, with a particular focus on location-aware mobile technologies and mobile phone use in developing countries. Her research has focused on understanding how the association between technology and urban environments is altering lifestyles, work patterns, and social interactions. She defines "hybrid space" as a space formed by merging the physical location with virtual spaces.

=== Electronic literature ===
de Souza e Silva and Fabian Winkler's work database was featured in the 2002 State of the Arts Conference for the Electronic Literature Organization. This work combined a printer, a video camera, and a database that could read and erase information. As the authors noted, "we challenge the idea of the database as a non-linear and digital structure, and the printer as an output device as well as an information recorder."

=== Location-aware mobile technologies ===
de Souza e Silva has worked on the topic of location-aware mobile technologies, including GPS-equipped cell phones. She has particularly focused on analyzing how location-based mobile games and location-based social networks facilitate individuals in coordinating their activities with others, acquiring information about their peers, and regulating their own privacy. In her book Mobile Interfaces in Public Spaces: Locational Privacy, Control, and Urban Sociability, she has described how mobile phones have become a geographical mapping tool that people use to extract location-based information and how it has advanced the concept of public spaces, locational privacy, and networks of power. She evaluated that location-based technologies are capable of restructuring communication relationships and social interaction environments in public spaces and have the potential to enhance connection with locations, rather than isolating individuals from their surroundings.

de Souza e Silva and Eric Gordon's book Net Locality: Why Location Matters in a Networked World (2014) was the first book that covered the area of Net locality and highlighted the significant effects of accessibility of location-based technologies on individuals and societies. Jason Cabanes contended that the historical approach of this work is its most important contribution to the field. The authors explained “net locality” as an emerging form of location awareness and warned about the associated threats of these technologies. Didem Ozkul, in her book review stated that "In employing such a perspective on the problematic of location awareness, the book fills an important gap in media and communications literature by analyzing how individuals and societies use this emerging form of location awareness." She also observed a gradual change in the traditional communication standards and use of mobile phones to avoid interactions in public spaces and the emergence of new ways of interacting among the urban population.

=== Urban mobility ===
In several peer-reviewed articles, de Souza e Silva has talked about games and their role in enhancing urban mobility. She explored the playful mobilities of Pokémon Go in the Global South and revealed that players decide about their mobility based on risk perceptions and also mentioned that players in urban environments adapt to their material circumstances in order to engage in gameplay and support one another. In a study on urban mobility, she talked about taxi-hailing apps in Rio de Janeiro and suggested them as a source of security and that despite being accepted overwhelmingly, these applications are a part of a system that involves mobility politics, surveillance, data collection, and control that can go unnoticed by both passengers and drivers. Her early research also includes the usage of mobile technologies among the researcher and artistic community of Brazil. This early research continued with her 2006 article, “From Cyber to Hybrid: Mobile Technologies as Interfaces of Hybrid Spaces” in Space and Culture that focuses on how mobile phones connect physical spaces with digital mobile media.

== Bibliography ==
=== Selected books ===
- Mobile Interfaces in Public Spaces: Locational privacy, control, and urban sociability (2012). This work suggests that location aware technologies strengthen our connections to physical locations as the technologies work as interfaces to public spaces.
- Dialogues on Mobile Communication (2016) (De Souza e Silva edited this book, which Ruoxu Wang states "draws on the perspective of mobile communication researchers."
- The Routledge Companion to Mobile Media Art (2020)
- Hybrid Play: Crossing boundaries in game design, player identities, and hybrid spaces (2020)

=== Selected articles ===
- De Souza, A. (2003). Hybrid Spaces in Art and Science Fiction from cyberspace to mobile interfaces. Contemporânea Revista de Comunicação e Cultura, 1(1).
- De Souza e Silva, A. (2004). Are cell phones new media. Hybrid communities and collective authorship.
- De Souza e Silva, A. (2009). Hybrid reality and location-based gaming: Redefining mobility and game spaces in urban environments. Simulation & Gaming, 40(3), 404–424.
- De Souza e Silva, A. (2010). Locational Privacy in Public Spaces: Media Discourses on Location-Aware Mobile Technologies. Communication, Culture & Critique. Dec2010, Vol. 3, Issue 4, pp. 503–525.
- De Souza E Silva, A., Duarte, F., & Damasceno, C. S. (2017). Creative Appropriations in Hybrid Spaces: Mobile Interfaces in Art and Games in Brazil. International Journal of Communication (19328036), 11.
- De Souza e Silva, A., Glover-Rijkse, R., Njathi, A., & de Cunto Bueno, D. (2021). Exploring the material conditions of Pokémon Go play in Rio de Janeiro and Nairobi. Information, Communication & Society, 24(6), 813–829.
