= David Jhave Johnston =

Canadian poet known for work in digital media and machine learning

- Known for: Poet, Electronic Literature writer, Digital Video artist, Motion Graphic artist, Digital Language Artist, Computational Poet
- Notable work: ReRites, Zero Whack, NomadLingo, Aesthetic Animism
- Awards: The 2022 Robert Coover Award for a Work of Electronic Literature
- Scientific career
- Education: Concordia University
- Fields: Electronic literature
- Workplaces: University of Bergen, City University of Hong Kong

David Jhave Johnston is a Canadian poet, videographer, and motion graphics artist working chiefly in digital and computational media, and a researcher at the Center for Digital Narrative at the University of Bergen. This artist's work is often attributed, simply, to the name Jhave.

== Education and career ==
Jhave completed his PhD at Concordia University in 2011, and taught between 2014 and 2017 at the School of Creative Media, City University of Hong Kong, after which he returned to Montreal.

== Literary and artistic work ==
ReRites is one of the first literary works written in collaboration with neural networks, which Jhave trained on a corpus of 600,000 lines of poetry, and it was the winner of the Electronic Literature Organization's Robert Coover Award for a Work of Electronic Literature in 2022. In 2019 the arts press Anteism released twelve books of poetry produced by ReRites and edited by Jhave, and a book of essays about the work.

ReRites came out of a multi-year experimentation process with poetry generation that Jhave called Big Data Poetry, or BDP, which was also discussed in Scott Rettberg's Electronic Literature.

Zero Whack (2010) was a series of books that were "custom crafted from phrases that return no results in search engines."

AmputationBox is an installation piece allowing participants to place their hand in a box, at which point a manipulated image of their hand is "visually amputated" and displayed on a local screen and a website.

== Scholarship ==
Jhave is also a theorist of poetics in digital media. He has also produced a number of videos documenting interviews with prominent practitioners and theorists of poetry and poetics in new media.

=== Aesthetic Animism ===
David Jhave Johnston's 2016 book Aesthetic Animism won the N. Katherine Hayles Award for Criticism of Electronic Literature in 2017, awarded by the Electronic Literature Organization. The jury stated that Jhave "argues persuasively that it is in the convergence of literature and computation that language truly comes alive, proliferates, "rolls over" and wriggles through data space. [His] expressive prose matches his bold ideas. At the same time, the book's structure provides a clear, scholarly, always informative account and analysis of the theories of animism in language arts and its practice in computer-based arts."

In Aesthetic Animism, Johnston argues that the dynamic and interactive properties which digital media may afford to linguistic artefacts gives evidence of the animism, the life that, according to some, invests all things. In a review of the book for Textual Practice, Maisie Ridgeway notes that Johnston's animism is different too, but inclusive of other object-oriented philosophies such as Jane Bennett's vital materialism. The animism of digital literature is, Ridgeway writes, "reconfigured as a solution that returns language to the body, healing the divide between heart and head". Ridgeway does, however, question whether "the categorical boundaries of aesthetic animism are still too anthropocentric, setting the parameters of life by what can ‘pass’ as living according to us, rather than conceptualising a language that lives despite us and with little regard for our categorisations". David Heckman has an opposite response, writing in a review for Rhizome that "I (..) wrestle with the autonomy he ascribes to objects".

Heckman describes Aesthetic Animism as a book that "sits at the intersection of the venerable, deliberate craft of poetry and the “unprofessional” approach of the tinkerer", at times reading like an encyclopaedia and at others like "a series of prompts that beg further exploration, a speculative explosion of articles that could be". Florence Penny finds the term aesthetic animism to be "robust and revelatory in application, enabling subtle connections that go beyond the scope of digital poetry", although she writes that the book is uneven: "when it is good it is very, very good, and when it is not, it is unreliable." Heckman appears to see this unevenness more as a feature than a flaw: "The claims it advances are not ironclad decrees, but rather seeds scattered in the wind". Scott Rettberg also cites the book in Electronic Literature, summarizing certain of its ideas and explaining Jhave's concept of TAVIT 'Text-Audio-Visual Interactivity'.

== Selected literary works ==
- ReRites (2017–19)
- McLu-uhms (2012). Reviewed by Leonardo Flores.
- Zero whack. 2010.
- NomadLingo. 1999–2000.

== Scholarly books ==
- Aesthetic Animism (2016)
