= Penelope Trunk =

American writer and entrepreneur (born 1966)

- Born: Adrienne Roston; December 10, 1966 (age 59); Wilmette, Illinois, U.S.
- Other names: Adrienne Greenheart; Adrienne Eisen
- Education: Brandeis University
- Occupations: Entrepreneur; writer; blogger
- Years active: 1996–present
- Known for: Six Sex Scenes
- Website: penelopetrunk.com

Penelope Trunk (born Adrienne Roston, December 10, 1966; legal name Adrienne Greenheart) is an American writer and entrepreneur. Trunk published literary works including electronic literature in the 1990s and early 2000s under the pen name Adrienne Eisen and later under the name Penelope Trunk, a name she adopted in her public life.

Trunk founded several startup companies and provides career advice through her blog penelopetrunk.com. She has written columns about the workplace and the job market for several publications, including the syndicated column, "Brazen Careerist", featured on Yahoo! Finance, and "The Climb," which ran in The Boston Globe. She has also appeared on news programs such as 20/20 and in segments for CNN and NPR.

Inc. magazine referred to her as "arguably the world's most influential guidance counselor" in 2011. She was included on TechCrunch's list of "30 Women Who Have Revolutionized A Male-Dominated Industry" in 2015.

== Early life ==
Trunk was born in Wilmette, Illinois, and graduated from Brandeis University in 1990, before moving to Los Angeles to pursue a career as a professional beach volleyball player. On the Women's Professional Beach Volleyball Tour she was ranked 17th in the US.

== Career ==
=== Hypertext ===
In the early-90s, Trunk was introduced to hypertext by a boyfriend who curated content for use in CD-i format. Once the internet became public domain, her boyfriend taught her HTML and in 1993 Trunk created her own website where she posted her hypertext works.

In 1996 she published the hypertext fiction Six Sex Scenes as Adrienne Greenheart, and was credited under her pen name, Adrienne Eisen, from 2000 onward. Written in the first-person, the semi-autobiographical story focuses on the love life of a young Jewish woman, interspersed with flashbacks to her childhood, both of which are fraught with dysfunction. The reader starts the story in a section titled "Therapy", and is presented with a series of options at the end of the section in the form of hyperlinks that lead to other sections of the story, similar to a Choose Your Own Adventure book.

=== Journalism ===
Trunk has written articles related to career advice, entrepreneurship and the evolution of the workplace for publications and news agencies such as The Boston Globe, The Wall Street Journal, Business Week, Glamour, Marie Claire, Business 2.0, BNET and Yahoo! Finance. Her blog posts were syndicated to more than 200 newspapers. She has also appeared as a guest commentator on 20/20, CNN, and NPR.

Trunk blogs and provides career advice through her personal website, penelopetrunk.com.

=== Books ===
In 2001 Trunk published Making Scenes with Alt-X (a subsidiary of University of Colorado), which is a book based on pages previously published on her website. The novel was republished by Emily Books in 2012.

Trunk's second book, Brazen Careerist: The New Rules for Success, was published by Warner Books.

=== Entrepreneurship ===
Trunk founded the companies math.com and eCityDeals. She co-founded Brazen Careerist, a social networking site aimed at millennials entering the job market, now called Brazen Technologies.

Since moving to Darlington, Wisconsin, Trunk co-founded Quistic, an online learning company.

== Personal life ==
Trunk has been married twice and has two children. She moved with her family from New York City to Madison, Wisconsin, in 2006, before relocating to a farm near Darlington, Wisconsin.

Trunk is very open about her life and has received media attention for tweets about her divorce and miscarriage. The New York Times included Trunk's tweets about her divorce in a 2008 article about the airing of "dirty laundry" on social media.

In 2009, Trunk was preparing to have an abortion, but suffered a miscarriage during a company board meeting. She tweeted about the incident, which received widespread media attention. She was also interviewed on CNN about the incident. It was around this time, Marin Cogan recalled in an article for The Cut, that Trunk's blog began to take on a darker tone, less appealing than the one that had made her the "Sheryl Sandberg long before Sandberg wrote Lean In". Cogan came to feel she and other early career women had been "mistaken in assuming that Trunk’s brazen careerism was a feminist project in any meaningful sense."

Trunk describes herself as having Asperger syndrome.

=== Name changes ===
Trunk's name at birth was Adrienne Roston. She posted to her blog in 2007 that she legally changed her last name to Greenheart (which at times she spelled GreenHeart) because she "[didn't] want to be associated with patriarchal naming conventions."

In a 2010 interview with Magazine Electronique du CIAC (a publication by Centre International d'Art Contemporain de Montreal), she said she changed her last name from Greenheart to Eisen because she "had a big job and my company just forced me to change the name on the hypertexts."

She claims that her name change to Penelope Trunk was prompted by Time Warner when she was hired to write for them. She later adopted it in her personal life. She also told Magazine Electronique du CIAC that her original first name, Adrienne, causes her emotional discomfort and reminds her of negative experiences during her childhood.

== Bibliography ==
=== Hypertexts ===
- Six Sex Scenes (as Adrienne Greenheart, later Adrienne Eisen) (Alt-X, 1996)

=== Books ===
- "Making Scenes" (as Adrienne Eisen) (Broadvision, April 2001, ISBN 978-0970351708)
- Brazen Careerist: The New Rules for Success (Warner, May 2007, ISBN 0-446-57864-9)
- The New American Dream: A Blueprint for a New Path to Success (Hyperink, July 2012, ISBN 1614649928)
- The Power of Mentors: The Guide to Finding and Learning from Your Ideal Mentor (Hyperink, October 2012)
