= Johan de Wit (poet) =

Dutch poet

Johan de Wit (born 1944) is a contemporary expatriate Dutch poet. He is the author of as many as twenty publications. His first collection, Rose Poems, was published by Actual Size in 1986. Up To You Munro by Veer Books appeared in 2008. Reality Street published his Gero Nimo in 2011. Kenya (Veer) was published in 2016 (with Antony John and Wayne Clements).

He has been described as one of the most innovative poets writing in English in the past twenty years.
