= ReRites =

Literary work of "Human + A.I. poetry"

- Author: David Jhave Johnston
- Language: English
- Genre: poetry
- Publication date: 2018

ReRites (also known as RERITES, ReadingRites, Big Data Poetry) is a literary work of "Human + A.I. poetry" by David Jhave Johnston that used neural network models trained to generate poetry which the author then edited. ReRites won the Robert Coover Award for a Work of Electronic Literature in 2022.

== About the project ==
The ReRites project began as a daily rite of writing with a neural network, expanded into a series of performances from which video documentation has been published online, and concluded with a set of 12 books and an accompanying book of essays published by Anteism Books in 2019. In Electronic Literature, Scott Rettberg describes the early phases of the project in 2016, when it bore the preliminary name Big Data Poetry.

Jhave (the artist name that David Jhave Johnston goes by) describes the process of writing ReRites as a rite: "Every morning for 2 hours (normally 6:30–8:30am) I get up and edit the poetic output of a neural net. Deleting, weaving, conjugating, lineating, cohering. Re-writing. Re-wiring authorship: hybrid augmented enhanced evolutionary". There is video documentation of the writing process.

The human editing of the neural network's output is fundamental to this project, and Jhave gives examples of both unedited text extracts and his edited versions in publications about the project. Kyle Booten describes ReRites as "simultaneously dusty and outrageously verdant, monotonously sublime and speckled with beautiful and rare specimens".

=== Performances ===
ReRites was first shared with an audience through a series of performances where audience members and poets would participate in reading the automatically generated texts, which appeared on screen so fast that human readers could barely keep up. This has been described as allowing participants to "re-discover[..] the peculiar pleasures of being embodied", or, in Jhave's own words, as a space where human participants were "playing their wits and voices against an evocative infinite deep-learning muse".

The first performance was at Brown University's Interrupt Festival in 2019. It has been performed many times since, including at the Barbican Centre in London and Anteism Books.

=== Print publications ===
For a single year Jhave published one book of poetry from the ReRites project each month. These twelve volumes are accompanied by a book of essays, all published by Anteism Books. The accompanying essays provide critical responses to the project from poets and scholars including Allison Parrish, Johanna Drucker, Kyle Booten, Stephanie Strickland, John Cayley, Lai-Tze Fan, Nick Montfort, Mairéad Byrne, and Chris Funkhouser. Allison Parrish notes elsewhere that these paratexts to ReRites serve a legitimising function for a genre of poetry that is not yet institutionally acknowledged.

=== Technical details ===
Starting in 2016 under the name Big Data Poetry, Jhave generated poems using, in his own words, "neural network code (..) adapted from three corporate github-hosted machine-learning libraries: TensorFlow (Google), PyTorch (Facebook), and AWD-LSTM (SalesForce)". He explains that the "models were trained on a customised corpus of 600,000 lines of poetry ranging from the romantic epoch to the 20th century avant garde". Jhave maintains a GitHub repository with some of the code supporting ReRites.

== Reception ==
ReRites is described by John Cayley as "one of the most thorough and beautiful" poetic responses to machine learning. The work's influence on the field of electronic literature was acknowledged in 2022, when the work won the Electronic Literature Organization's Robert Coover Award for a Work of Electronic Literature. The jury described ReRites as particularly poignant in the time of the pandemic, as it was "a documentation of the performance of the private ritual of writing and the obsessive-compulsive need for writers to communicate — even when no one else is reading".

The question of authorship and voice in ReRites has been raised by several critics. Although generated poetry is an established genre in electronic literature, Cayley notes that unlike the combinatory poems created by authors like Nick Montfort, where the author explicitly defines which words and phrases will be recombined, ReRites has "not been directed by literary preconceptions inscribed in the program itself, but only by patterns and rhythms pre-existing in the corpora". In an essay for the Australian journal TEXT, David Thomas Henry Wright asks how to understand authorship and authority in ReRites: "Who or what is the authority of the work? The original data fed into the machine, that is not currently retrievable or discernible from the final works? The code that was taken and adapted for his purposes? Or Jhave, the human editor?" Wright concludes that Jhave is the only actor with any intentionality and therefore the authority of the work. The centrality of the human editor is also emphasised by other scholars. In a chapter analysing ReRites Malthe Stavning Erslev argues that the machine learning misrepresents the dataset it is trained on.

While ReRites uses 21st century neural networks, it has been compared to earlier literary traditions. Poet Victoria Stanton, who read at one of the ReRites performances, has compared ReRites to found poetry, while David Thomas Henry Wright compares it to the Oulipo movement and Mark Amerika to the cut-up technique. Scholars also position ReRites firmly within the long tradition of generative poetry both in electronic literature and print, stretching from the I Ching, Queneau's Cent Mille Milliards de Poemes and Nabokov's Pale Fire to computer-generated poems like Christopher Strachey's Love Letter Generator (1952) and more contemporary examples.

Jhave describes the process of working with the output from the neural network as "carving". In his book My Life as an Artificial Creative Intelligence, Mark Amerika writes that the "method of carving the digital outputs provided by the language model as part of a collaborative remix jam session with GPT-2, where the language artist and the language model play off each other’s unexpected outputs as if caught in a live postproduction set, is one I share with electronic literature composer David Jhave Johnston, whose AI poetry experiments precede my own investigations."
