= Wayne Clements =

British artist and poet

Wayne Clements is a contemporary British artist and poet. His books include, Weather Poems (Red Ceilings Press, 2021), From, A Country Diary (Knives Forks and Spoons Press, 2018), Kenya (Veer, 2016, with Antony John and Johan de Wit (poet)), Lives of the Saints (Red Ceilings, 2016), Variant Lines and Other Poems (Red Ceilings, 2013), Archeus (Department Press, 2012), Western Philosophy (Knives Forks and Spoons Press, 2011), Clerical Work (Veer, 2010), History of the Russian Revolution (Writers Forum 2005), Vertical Stepping (Writers Forum 2001) and Depressions Strokes (Writers Forum 2000). He holds a PhD in Fine Art from Chelsea College of Art and Design. He has exhibited his new media artworks internationally. In 2006 he won the Award of Distinction for Net Vision at Ars Electronica for un_wiki.

An audio CD of Clements reading from "Clerical Work" was released by Veer in 2010.

== See also ==
- Digital Poetry
