= The Unknown (hypertext novel) =

1999 web-based hypertext novel

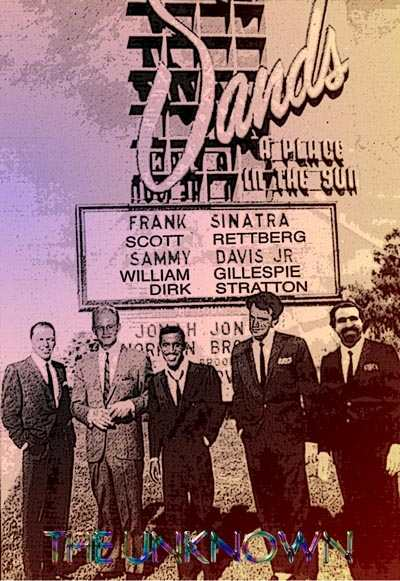
- Author: William Gillespie, Scott Rettberg, Dirk Stratton, Frank Marquadt
- Illustrators: Adam Richer, Katie Gilligan
- Language: English
- Genre: Hypertext fiction, Electronic literature
- Publication date: 1999
- Publication place: United States
- Media type: Web, XHTML, RealAudio, MP3
- Award: 1st Trace/Alt-X International Hypertext Contest
- Website: http://unknownhypertext.com

The Unknown (also known as The Unknown: The Original Great American Hypertext Novel ) is a web-based hypertext novel written by William Gillespie, Scott Rettberg and Dirk Stratton with Frank Marquardt. It won the 1999 Trace/Alt-X International Hypertext Contest. The name The Unknown was used to refer to both the work and its authors.

== Plot ==
The Unknown is a sprawling hypertext novel about a fictional book tour the four authors are on to promote the Unknown Anthology.

Kristin Krauth describes it as "a satire on publishing and promotion as well as a tough and funny look at the nature of creating hypertext". Brad Quinn describes the plot as "an adventure novel about a book tour for a book that doesn't exist, and it has all kinds of ridiculous behavior, drug abuse and famous people who would probably be shocked and none too happy to find out that they are in the novel."

== Performances ==
The Unknown was not only a story about a book tour, the authors performed the hypertext at many different events. One of the first performances was at a Brown University event called "Technology Platforms for 21st Century Literature" (TP21CL). A journalist writing about the event for PC Magazine noted that "A group of authors gave a reading of a funny hypertext novel called "The Unknown," which had different tracks you move among." Writing for the MIT Technology Review, Nick Montfort describes the authors performing in suits, and beginning the reading by reading a fictionalised account of travelling to the reading they are actually at. Montfort writes: "The different authors rotate through three roles. One reads, one works the mouse, and one dings a bell to alert the audience to each hypertext link. Audience members interact by calling out when they want to click on a link."

An article in the Los Angeles Times about a reading they did in 2000 quotes Dirk Stratton: "With the traditional reading, you have the silent audience: attentive, rapt, staring up at the genius author waiting for enlightenment. We have given away that authorial control (..) We put up a space that’s filled with text, that’s filled with many different paths, and we let the audience tell us where to go."

== Creation ==
The novel was started when William Gillespie, Scott Rettberg and Dirk Stratton "simply sat down and started writing one June day in 1998, in Cincinnati", where two of the writers were grad students and one taught writing.

== The Unknown Anthology ==
The web novel is framed as a fictional book tour to promote a fictional anthology. In 2002 the writers actually published a print anthology of their writing, titled The Unknown: An Anthology.

== Reception ==
Journalists writing about The Unknown when it was new tend to emphasise both the novelty of reading a story on the web, and the humour of the work. For instance, Brad Quinn wrote, in 2000, "I have spent hours reading The Unknown. It's impossible to know how big it is, because I rarely run across the same page twice. But as much as I hate to read anything longer than a short e-mail or a box score on the Web, I don't mind reading The Unknown, mostly because it's fun."

The Unknown is usually situated as a postmodern novel, although this is problematised by Ugo Panzani. Writing in 2021, Spencer Jordan describes it as "in essence an exploration of postmodern creativity. The deep irony, fragmentation and deathlessness of the work, the satirical use of pastiche, are all classic tropes of the postmodern genre." Kevin Brooks also calls attention to The Unknown's basis in the picaresque novel and the road trip movie.

The collaborative writing at the heart of The Unknown has inspired later projects, including the Polish work Piksel Zdrój which was explicitly modelled on the picaresque and digressive nature of The Unknown.

== Awards ==
The Unknown was a co-winner of the first trAce/Alt-X prize in 1999 and was performed live at the ACM Hypertext conference in San Antonio in 2000.
