= Digital poetry =

Form of electronic literature

Digital poetry is a form of electronic literature, displaying a wide range of approaches to poetry, with a prominent and crucial use of computers. Digital poetry can be available in form of CD-ROM, DVD, as installations in art galleries, in certain cases also recorded as digital video or films, as digital holograms, on the World Wide Web or Internet, and as mobile phone apps.

According to Saum-Pascual (2019), digital poetry is the artistic heir to the avant-garde movements of the second half of the 20th century, including Lettrism, concrete poetry, and conceptual poetry.

A significant portion of current publications of poetry are available either only online or via some combination of online and offline publication. Digital poetry types hypertext, kinetic poetry, computer generated animation, digital visual poetry, interactive poetry, code poetry, experimental video poetry, virtual poetry (that uses virtual reality systems), and poetries that take advantage of the programmable nature of the computer to create works that are interactive, or use a generative or combinatorial approach to create text (or one of its states), or involve sound poetry, or take advantage of things like listservs, blogs, and other forms of network communication to create communities of collaborative writing and publication (as in poetical wikis).

Digital platforms allow the creation of art that spans different media: text, images, sounds, and interactivity via programming. Contemporary poetries have, therefore, taken advantage of this toward the creation of works that synthesize both arts and media. Whether a work is poetry visual art music or programming is sometimes not clear, but we expect an intense engagement with language in poetical works.

== History ==
Early digital poems include Christopher Strachey's love letter generator (1952), the stochastic texts which were indirectly produced by the German mathematician Theo Lutz in 1959 by programming a Z22 of Konrad Zuse; Nanni Balestrini's "Tape Mark I" in Italian, published in 1961; and Brion Gysin's English permutation poems from around 1959, done automatically with the collaboration of Ian Somerville. These and other early digital poems are discussed in C. T. Funkhouser's Prehistoric Digital Poetry.

== Hypertext ==
Hypertext poetry refers to creative works that are interconnected through the mechanics of digitization. This form of cyberpoetry has a specific focus on visual arts that are connected across different mediums. In other words, hypertext poetry is a classification of digital poetry that links the reader to different places in a document or different documents on the Internet. In general, hypertext poetry combines the elements of culture and intertextuality to marry poetry to various digital mediums such as images, videos, texts, and songs.

Hypertext usually falls into two categories: exploratory and constructive. Exploratory hypertext poetry allows users to navigate through a text by interest, engagement, and reflection. This means readers can explore and think creatively about a poem that is digitized on a computer. Constructive hypertext poetry takes a different approach. This poetry is built by an audience over time to create a fully fleshed-out final draft. Along with this, audiences can look at previous versions of the text. In all, the focus of constructive hypertext poetry is how computer software and machinery can enhance the creation of poetry. As such, users can see first-hand the amalgamation of an author's inspiration, writing process, and cultural influences.

The advent of hypertext poetry can be dated back to the mid-1980s. Ted Nelson is often credited for coining the term in the 1960s. Ted Nelson coined the term as he believed printed text would soon be outdated and that literature would move to a more digital sphere. Some people disagree on when exactly the term came to be. "Hypertext" has origins in the 18th century. Moreover, it is believed that Vannevar Bush's description of "the memex" in 1945 also referred to hypertext.

While there are a variety of factors that have caused hypertext to be as well known as it is today, its popularization can be traced back to two particular events. One event is Apple's invention and heavy promotion of the "Hypercard" in 1987. This made hypertext less niche, where thousands of people could now recognize and understand the concept. In addition, there was a large national conference on hypertext held in 1987, drawing participants from multiple studies and disciplines.

== Interactivity ==
Interactive poetry is a form of digital poetry by which the reader may or must contribute to the content, form, or performance of the work, thereby influencing the meaning and experience of the poem. Interaction allows the reader to participate and influence the work and their experience of it.

Interactive poetry is limited to a digital medium as it cannot perform the same function in other media such as print, which limits accessibility. Interactive poetry can also provide a different experience with each reading or from reader to reader so analysis of this type of poetry can be challenging as the experience is not static.

An example of audience participatory poetry is haikU by Nanette Wylde. Elit scholar, Scott Rettberg writes of this project "Nanette Wylde’s haikU (2001) is a project based on principles of user participation and on the use of a randomizing function to produce haiku that startle in the sense of producing unintended juxtapositions—no single author has determined which lines will appear together. The reading interface is a simple, spare web page. Every time a reader reloads the page, a new haiku is produced. Following a link to “Write haiku” individuals can submit their own haiku in three lines, each of which has its own button to post the line to bins of first, middle, and last lines. The poems delivered on each reload of the site are not the individual haiku as submitted by readers, but recombinations of these first, middle, and last lines of haiku pulled together in a variable way. Reloading the page twenty times or so, it is remarkable how many of the poems read as if they have been individually intended by a human intelligence. Most of the haiku, perhaps 80%, cohere quite well as poetry."

== Notable poets ==
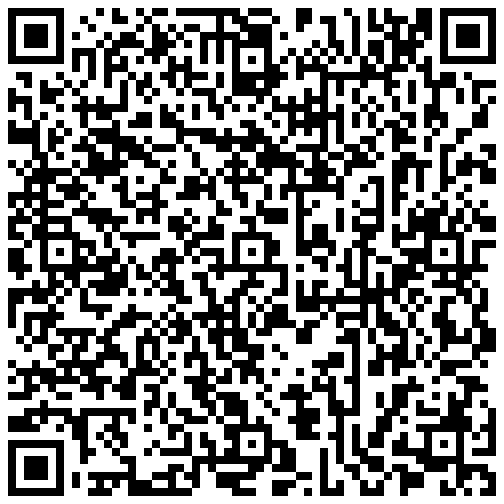
33.3 QR code poem by Genco Gulan

- Annie Abrahams
- Paulo Aquarone
- Mez Breeze
- J.R. Carpenter
- John Cayley
- M.D. Coverley
- Wayne Clements
- Caterina Davinio
- Kate Durbin
- Tina Escaja
- Belen Gache
- Kenneth Goldsmith
- Loss Pequeño Glazier
- Genco Gulan
- Ladislao Pablo Győri
- David Jhave Johnston
- Chris Joseph
- Eduardo Kac
- Alison Knowles
- Robert Kendall
- Richard Kostelanetz
- Deena Larsen
- Francesco Levato
- Judy Malloy
- María Mencía
- Yucef Merhi
- Nick Montfort
- Jason Nelson
- Philip M. Parker
- Allison Parrish
- Yatin Patel
- Teo Spiller
- Jon Stone
- Stephanie Strickland
- Gianni Toti
- Nanette Wylde
- Young-Hae Chang Heavy Industries
- Jody Zellen
- Komninos Zervos

== See also ==
- Computational creativity § Poetry
- Cybertext
- Digital art
- Electronic art
- Electronic literature
- Electronic Literature Organization
- Electronic Poetry Center
- Generative literature
- Instapoetry
- New media art

== Bibliography ==
- AAVV, La coscienza luccicante. Dalla videoarte all’arte interattiva, Gangemi, Roma 1998
- Jean-Pierre BALPE, "L'Ordinateur, sa muse", in "Pratiques" nº 39, Metz 1984
- Jean-Pierre BALPE, "La position de l'auteur dans la génération automatique de textes à orientations littéraires", in "Lynx" nº 17, Université de Paris-X Nanterre, Nanterre, 1987
- Friedrich W. BLOCK, Christiane HEIBACH, Karin WENZ (eds.), p0es1s. The Aesthetics of Digital Poetry, Ostfildern-Ruit, Hatje Cantz, 2004 (German, English)
- Wayne CLEMENTS. "Poetry Beyond the Turing Test", Electronic Visualisation and the Arts (EVA 2016)
- Caterina DAVINIO, “Parole virtuali. La poesia video-visiva tra arte elettronica e avanguardia”, in "Doc(K)s. Un notre web” (libro e CD), serie 3, 21, 22, 23, 24, Ajaccio (F) 1999
- Caterina DAVINIO, "Scritture/Realtà virtuali" in "Doc(K)s" (web), 2000
- Caterina DAVINIO, Tecno-Poesia e realtà virtuali (Techno-Poetry and Virtual Reality), essay with preface by Eugenio Miccini (Italian/English), Mantova, Sometti, 2002.
- Sergei A. DEMCHENKOV, Dmitriy M. FEDYAEV, Natalya D. FEDYAEVA, "Autopoet" Project: a Semantic Anomalies Generator or a New Existence Creator? in "Astra Salvensis" Vol. 6. Supplement 1, ASTRA, 2018. P. 639-646
- Tina Escaja, "Escritura tecnetoesquelética e hipertexto en poetas contemporáneas en la red.” in Espéculo (Universidad Complutense de Madrid). 24 (Julio-Octubre), 2003
- Chris T. FUNKHOUSER, Prehistoric Digital Poetry, An Archeology of Forms, 1959–1995, Tuscaloosa, The University of Alabama Press, 2007
- Loss Pequeño GLAZIER, Digital Poetics: The Making of E-Poetries, Tuscaloosa, The University of Alabama Press, 2002
- Eduardo KAC, New Media Poetry: Poetic Innovation and New Technologies, "Visible Language" Vol. 30, No. 2, Rhode Island School of Design, 1996.
- Eduardo KAC, Hodibis Potax, Édition Action Poétique, Ivry-sur-Seine (France) and Kibla, Maribor (Slovenia), 2007.
- Eduardo KAC, Media Poetry: an International Anthology (Second Edition), Bristol: Intellect, 2007.
- Eduardo KAC, Telepresence, Biotelematics, Transgenic art, Association for Culture and Education, Maribor 2000
- Alexis KIRKE (1995). "The Emuse: Symbiosis and the Principles of Hyperpoetry". Brink. Electronic Poetry Centre, University of Buffalo. Archived from the original on 2016-03-03.
- George P. LANDOW. Hypertext 2.0. 2nd ed. Baltimore: Johns Hopkins UP, 1997.
- Naji, Jeneen. Digital Poetry. Palgrave Macmillan, 2021.
- Philadelpho MENEZES, Poetics and Visuality, translation Harry Polkinhorn, San Diego State University Press, 1995.
- Philadelpho MENEZES, Poesia Concreta e Visual, São Paulo, Ática, 1998.
- Philadelpho MENEZES(org.), Poesia Sonora: poéticas experimentais da voz no século XX, São Paulo: EDUC (Editora da PUC), 1992.
- Philadelpho MENEZES, "Poesia Visual: reciclagem e inovação", em revista Imagens, número 6, Campinas, Editora da Unicamp, 1996, pp. 39/48.
- Philadelpho MENEZES, "Poetics and new technologies of communication: a semiotic approach" in Face - Revista de Semiótica e Comunicação, D.1, 1998, site: www.pucsp.br/~cos-puc/face
- Kenneth MEYER, “Dramatic narrative in Virtual Reality”, in Frank BIOCCA e Mark R. LEVY (eds.), Communication in the Age of Virtual Reality, Hillsdale, New Jersey, Lawrence Erlbaum, 1995, pp. 219/259.
- Janet MURRAY, Hamlet on the Holodeck – The future of narrative in Cyberspace, Cambridge, MIT Press, 1997.
- Tom O'Connor, Poetic Acts & New Media, Lanham MD: University Press of America, 2006.
- Walter J. ONG, Orality and literacy – The technologizing of the word, Londres, Routledge, 1989.
- Cynthia D. SHIRKEY. “E-poetry: Digital Frontiers for an Evolving Art Form.” C&RL News 64.4 (April 2003).
- Janez Strehovec. Text as Ride. Morgentown. West Virginia UP (Computing Literature), 2016.
- Eric VOS. "New Media poetry - Theory and Strategies" in : Eduardo KAC (ed.), New Media Poetry: Poetic Innovation and New Technologies, "Visible Language" Vol. 30, No. 2, Rhode Island School of Design, 1996.
