= Stuart Moulthrop =

United States author

- Born: 1957; Baltimore, Maryland
- Known for: Electronic literature, Hypertext fiction
- Notable work: Victory Garden

Academic background
- Education: Yale University
- Doctoral advisor: J. Hillis Miller

Stuart Moulthrop (born 1957 in Baltimore, Maryland, United States) is an innovator of electronic literature and hypertext fiction, both as a theoretician and as a writer. He is author of the hypertext fiction works Victory Garden (1991), which was on the front-page of the New York Times Book Review in 1993, Reagan Library (1999), and Hegirascope (1995), amongst many others. Moulthrop is currently a Professor of Digital Humanities in the Department of English, at the University of Wisconsin–Milwaukee. He also became a founding board member of the Electronic Literature Organization in 1999.

== Education ==
Born in Baltimore, Maryland in 1957, he became an English major at George Washington University after reading Gravity's Rainbow by Thomas Pynchon in 1975. He received his PhD from Yale University in 1986. He taught at Yale from 1984 to 1990, and then at the University of Texas at Austin and the Georgia Institute of Technology. In 1994 he moved back to Baltimore to teach at the University of Baltimore. As a Professor of Information Arts and Technologies, he formerly taught in the Bachelor of Science in Simulation and Digital Entertainment. He also was involved in the Master's and Doctoral programs.

== Work in hypertext ==
Moulthrop began experimenting with hypertext theory in the 1980s, and has since authored several articles as well as written many hypertext fiction works. His hypertext Victory Garden was featured on the front page of the New York Times Book Review from a review by Robert Coover, and Hegirascope won the Eastgate Systems HYSTRUCT Award. He served as co-editor for Postmodern Culture and as of 2013 is listed as part of their editorial collective. He is partnered with Nancy Kaplan, Michael Joyce, and John McDaid in TINAC (Textuality, Intertextuality, Narrative, and Consciousness).

In 1987, Moulthrop created Forking Paths for an undergraduate writing class as a demonstration of hypertext, appropriating Borges' short story "Garden of Forking Paths". This hypertext acknowledges the possibility of having one source of data link to a group of data, which links to other group of data, and so forth until the viewer decides to exit the pool of information. J. Yellowlees Douglas extensively reviewed this work in her book The End of Books or Books without End?, and notes that this was one of the three hypertexts available in software in 1987. Forking Paths is available on a CDROM included with the anthology The New Media Reader.

Hyperbola: A Digital Companion to Gravity's Rainbow (1989) and Dreamtime 3.1 (1992) are digital works created in HyperCard.

In an analysis of the reception of Moulthrop's hypertext fictionVictory Garden, Dene Grigar found that it has been the subject of over 100 scholarly books, dissertations and articles.

Bell notes that Stuart Moulthrop's Higirascope (1995) explits web technology to set the pace of reading, as each screen was only available for 18 seconds. Markku Eskelinen notes that the second version allowed 30 seconds.
