= J. Yellowlees Douglas =

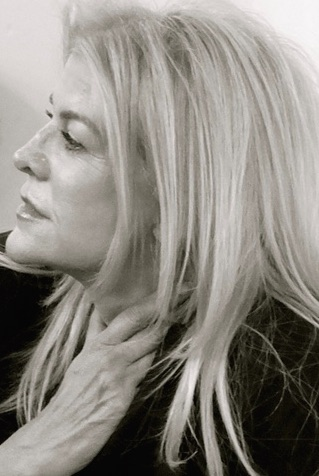
- Born: June 25, 1962 (age 64); Detroit, Michigan, U.S.
- Education: University of Michigan; New York University
- Scientific career
- Fields: Management Communication
- Workplaces: University of Florida; Holy Names University

Jane Yellowlees Douglas (born J. Yellowlees Douglas; June 25, 1962) is a pioneer author and scholar of hypertext fiction. She began writing about hypermedia in the late 1980s, very early in the development of the medium. Her 1993 fiction I Have Said Nothing, was one of the first published works of hypertext fiction.

== Early life and education ==
Douglas was born June 25, 1962, in Detroit, Michigan.

She completed her undergraduate studies in English language and literature at the University of Michigan in 1982, where she went on to get an M.A in cinema and literary theory. She received her Ph.D. in English and education from New York University in 1992.

Her Ph.D. dissertation, "Print pathways and interactive labyrinths: How hypertext narratives affect the act of reading," was supervised by Gordon M. Pradl. She spent a year as a research fellow at Brunel University in London examining the ways in which hypertext affects the construction of digital technologies.

== Career ==
In academia, Douglas has been the director of the program in professional writing and an assistant professor of English at Lehman College. She is presently Associate Professor of Management Communication in the Warrington College of Business Administration at the University of Florida.

Douglas was a contestant on Jeopardy! on March 8, 2013.

Douglas has founded and directed four writing programs at the University of Florida.

=== Writings ===
Douglas has written over two dozen articles, short stories, and a book about the development, structure, and uses of hypertext and electronic literature. In a 1991 article—quite early in the development of hypertext as a new literary medium—she argued for hypertext as offering an alternative to an "either/or" view of reality in the form of an "and/and/and" structure.

In her 2000 book, The End of Books or Books Without End, she examines how interactive fiction works and discusses the current state of hypertext criticism, arguing that hyptertext authors are the natural heirs of early 20th century experimental modernists like James Joyce.

In "What Hypertexts Can Do That Print Narratives Cannot", Douglas goes into more detail about how hypertext fiction works as a literary form. Critics have noted acerbity as a characteristic of Douglas's writing as she "makes plain her frustration that hyperfiction works and their writers are still not considered part of the canon."

Douglas is recognized for having discovered a node in Michael Joyce's hypertext novel Afternoon: a story that had no inbound links. In discussions about the novel, the node became known as "Jane's space" because she was the first to remark on its orphan status. She became implicated in revisions to this node, which originally (1987 edition) featured only a single phrase from Jung, "Man... never perceives anything", but later (1990 edition) included a second line: "and only Jane Yellowlees Douglas has read this line".

Douglas's hypertext fiction I Have Said Nothing (published by Eastgate Systems) is book-ended by two car crashes and the resulting deaths. Douglas's goal was to use the fragmentations of hypertext to explore both causality and the enormous gulfs that separate people from one another. Designed in Storyspace, the work offers readers a variety of strategies for navigation: a cognitive map, links in the text, a default narrative line, and a navigation menu of available paths.

== Selected publications ==
- The Readers Brain. How Neuroscience can make you a Better Writer, Cambridge 2015.
- “The Pleasures of Immersion and Engagement: Schemas, Scripts, and the Fifth Business.” In First Person: New Media as Story, Performance, and Game. Noah Wardrip-Fruin and Pat Harrigan, eds. Cambridge, MA: MIT Press, 2004. (essay; with Andrew Hargadon)
- The End of Books or Books Without End. University of Michigan Press, 2000 (book)
- “The Three Paradoxes of Hypertext: How Theories of Textuality Shape Interface Design.” In The Emerging CyberCulture: Literacy, Paradigm, and Paradox. Stephanie B. Gibson and Ollie Oviedo, eds. Cresskill, NJ: Hampton Press, 2000. (essay)
- "I Have Said Nothing". Eastgate Quarterly Review of Hypertext, vol. 1, no. 2, 1993. Republished in Postmodern American Fiction: A Norton Anthology. Paula Geyh, Fred G. Lebron, and Andrew Levy, eds. New York: Norton, 1997. (short story)
- “'But When Do I Stop?'" Closure and Indeterminacy in Interactive Narratives.” In Hyper/Text/Theory, George Landow, ed. Baltimore: Johns Hopkins University Press, 1994:159–188. (essay)
- "The Act of Reading: the WOE Beginners' Guide to Dissection". Writing on the Edge, vol. 2, no. 2, 1991. (essay)
- “Social Impacts of Computing: The Framing of Hypertext—Revolutionary for Whom?” Social Science Computer Review 11.4 (Winter 1993): 417-429.
- “Dipping into Possible, Plausible Worlds: the Experience of Interactivity from Virtual Reality to Interactive Fiction,” TDR, The Drama Review: The Journal of Performance Studies 37.4 (T140) Winter 1993: 18-37. (essay)
- “Making the Audience Real: Using Hypertext in the Writing Classroom,” Educators’ Tech Exchange 1.3 (Winter 1994): 17-23. (essay)
- “Plucked from the Labyrinth: Intention, Interpretation and Interactive Narratives,” Knowledge in the Making: Challenging the Text in the Classroom. Eds. Bill Corcoran, Mike Hayhoe and Gordon M. Pradl. Portsmouth, NH: Boynton/Cook, 1994: 179-192. (book chapter)
- “Technology, Pedagogy, or Context? A Tale of Two Classrooms,” Computers & Composition: 11 (1994): 275-282. (essay)
- “Virtual Intimacy and the Male Gaze Cubed: Interacting with Narratives on CD-ROM.” Leonardo 29.3 (1996): 207-213. (essay)
- “Abandoning the Either/Or for the And/And/And: Hypertext and the Art of Argumentative Writing,” Australian Journal of Language and Literacy 19.4 (1997): 305-316. (essay)
- “Will the Most Reflexive Relativist Please Stand Up? Hypertext, Argument, and Relativism,” Page to Screen: Taking Literacy into the Electronic Age. Ed. Ilana Snyder. Sydney: Allen & Unwin and New York: Routledge, 1997: 144-162. (essay)
- Hugh Davis, Jane Yellowlees Douglas, David Durand, Hypertext ’01: Proceedings of the 12th Conference on Hypertext and Hypermedia. New York: Association for Computing Machinery (ACM), January, 2001. (essay)
- Andrew Hargadon and Yellowlees Douglas, “When Innovations Meet Institutions: Edison and the Design of Electric Light.” Administrative Science Quarterly 46 (3), September 2001: 476-502. (essay)
- “Here Even When You’re Not: Teaching in an Internet Degree Program.” Silicon Literacies. Ed. Ilana Snyder. New York: Routledge, 2002. (book chapter)
- “Doing What Comes Generatively: Three Eras of Representation.” Theorizing the Matrix. Lewisburg, PA: Bucknell University Press, 2003: 58-76. (book chapter)
- Paul Fishwick, Yellowlees Douglas, and Timothy Davis, “Model Representation with Aesthetic Computing: Method and Empirical Study.” ACM TOMACS: Transactions on Modeling and Computer Simulation 15 (3) 2005: 254-279. (essay)
- “What Interactive Narratives Do That Print Narratives Cannot,” in Essentials of the Theory of Fiction. Eds. Michael J. Hoffman and Patrick D. Murphy. Durham, NC: Duke University Press, 2005: 443-471. (essay)
- Writing As A Survival Skill: How Neuroscience Can Improve Writing In Organizations,” American Journal of Business Education 5 (6), September/October 2012: 597-608. (essay)
- “How Plain Language Fails to Improve Organizational Communication: A Neuro-cognitive Basis for Readability,” Journal of International Management Studies 7(2), October, 2012. (essay)
- John Petersen and Yellowlees Douglas, “Tenascin-X, Collagen, and Ehlers-Danlos Syndrome: Tenascin-X Gene Defects Can Protect against Adverse Cardiovascular Events.” Medical Hypotheses 81 (3) (September 2013): 443-447. (essay)
- “Producing Something from Nothing: The First Conversation of Innovation—with Yourself,” The Journal of Global Business Management, Vol. 10 (1), April 2014: 107-120. (essay)
- Yellowlees Douglas and Samantha Miller, “Availability Bias Can Improve Women’s Propensity to Negotiate,” International Journal of Business Administration 6(2) 2015: 86-95. (essay)
- Yellowlees Douglas and Samantha Miller, “Syntactic Complexity of Reading Content Directly Impacts Complexity of Mature Students’ Writing,” International Journal Business Administration 7 (3) (May 2016): 62-71. (essay)
- “The Real Malady of Marcel Proust and What It Reveals about Diagnostic Errors in Medicine,” Medical Hypotheses 90 (16) 2016: 14-18.
- “Top-Down Research, Generalists, and Google Scholar: Does Google Scholar Facilitate Breakthrough Research?” Open Access Library Journal 3 (May) 2016: 1-8. (essay)
- Yellowlees Douglas and Samantha Miller, “Syntactic and Lexical Complexity of Reading Correlates with Complexity of Writing in Adults,” International Journal Business Administration 7 (4) (June 2016): 1-10. (essay)
- “The Power of Paradox: How Oppositional Schemas Enhance Recall in Organizational Communication,” International Journal Business Administration 8 (3) (May) 2017: 45-55. (essay)
- Yellowlees Douglas and Andrew Hargadon, “From Domestication to Differentiation and Back Again: How Design Spurs and also Limits Innovation,” The Elgar Companion to Innovation and Knowledge Creation: A Multi-Disciplinary Approach. Eds. Sebastian Henn, Harald Bathelt, Patrick Cohendet, and Laurent Simon. London, UK: Elgar Publishing, Ltd., 2017. (book chapter)
- Yellowlees Douglas and Maria B. Grant, The Biomedical Writer: What You Need to Succeed in Academic Medicine. Cambridge, UK and New York: Cambridge University Press, 2018. (book)

== See also ==
- Electronic literature
