= Electronic literature =

Literary works created for digital devices

- Features: Literary works that require the capabilities of computers and networks

Related genres
- Hypertext fiction, interactive fiction, digital poetry, generative literature, cell phone novels, instapoetry, cybertext, netprov, creepypasta, fan fiction, web fiction

Electronic literature or digital literature is a genre of literature where digital capabilities such as interactivity, multimodality or algorithmic text generation are used aesthetically. Works of electronic literature are usually intended to be read on digital devices, such as computers, tablets, and mobile phones. They cannot be easily printed, or cannot be printed at all, because elements crucial to the work cannot be carried over onto a printed version.

The first literary works for computers, created in the 1950s, were computer programs that generated poems or stories, now called generative literature. In the 1960s experimental poets began to explore the new digital medium, and the first early text-based games were created. Interactive fiction became a popular genre in the late 1970s and 1980s, with a thriving online community in the 2000s. In the 1980s and 1990s hypertext fiction begun to be published, first on floppy disks and later on the web. Hypertext fictions are stories where the reader moves from page to page by selecting links. In the 2000s digital poetry became popular, often including animated text, images and interactivity. In the 2010s and 2020s, electronic literature uses social media platforms, with new genres like Instapoetry or Twitterature as well as literary practices like netprov. Although web-based genres like creepypasta and fan fiction are not always thought of as electronic literature (because they usually manifest as linear texts that could be printed out and read on paper), other scholars argue that these are born digital genres that depend on online communities and thus should be included in the field.

There is an extensive body of scholarship on electronic literature. In 1999 the Electronic Literature Organization was established, which through annual conferences and other events supports both the publishing and study of electronic literature. One focus of academic study has been the preservation and archiving of works of electronic literature. This is challenging because works become impossible to access or read when the software or hardware they are designed for becomes obsolete. In addition, works of electronic literature are not part of the established publishing industry and so do not have ISBN numbers and are not findable in library catalogues. This has led to the establishment of a number of archives and documentation projects.

== Definitions ==
The literary critic and professor N. Katherine Hayles defines electronic literature as "'digital born' (..) and (usually) meant to be read on a computer", clarifying that this does not include e-books and digitised print literature.

A definition offered by the Electronic Literature Organization (ELO) states that electronic literature "refers to works with an important literary aspect that takes advantage of the capabilities and contexts provided by the stand-alone or networked computer". This can include hypertext fiction, animated poetry (often called kinetic poetry) and other forms of digital poetry, literary chatbots, computer-generated narratives or poetry, art installations with significant literary aspects, interactive fiction and literary uses of social media.

For example, a hypertext fiction is a story where the reader chooses a path through the story by clicking on links that connect fragments of text, often called lexias. In digital poetry the words in the poem may move across the screen or may involve game-like interactivity. In generative literature a single work can generate many different poems or stories. Until the early 2000s electronic literature works tended to be published on floppy disk, CD-ROM, in online literary journals or on dedicated websites. However, since around 2010 literary genres on social media platforms - such as Instapoetry, Twitterature or netprov - have come to be seen as electronic literature. The literary critic Leonardo Flores called these third generation electronic literature, following the first generation of pre-web works and the second generation of web-based works. Flores uses an inclusive definition of electronic literature, which can include social media posts with literary qualities even if the authors do not themselves think of it as literature. Fan fiction and creepypasta have also been analysed as electronic literature.

The definition of electronic literature is controversial within the field, with strict definitions being criticised for excluding valuable works, and looser definitions being so murky as to be useless. A work of electronic literature can be defined as "a construction whose literary aesthetics emerge from computation", "work that could only exist in the space for which it was developed/written/coded—the digital space". In his book Electronic Literature, the author and scholar Scott Rettberg argues that an advantage of a wide definition is its flexibility, which allows it to include new genres as new platforms and modes of literature emerge. Screenwriter and author Carolyn Handler Miller characterizes works of electronic literature as nonlinear and non chronological where the user experiences and co-creates the story, and where contradictory events and different outcomes are possible.

== History ==
=== Precursors ===
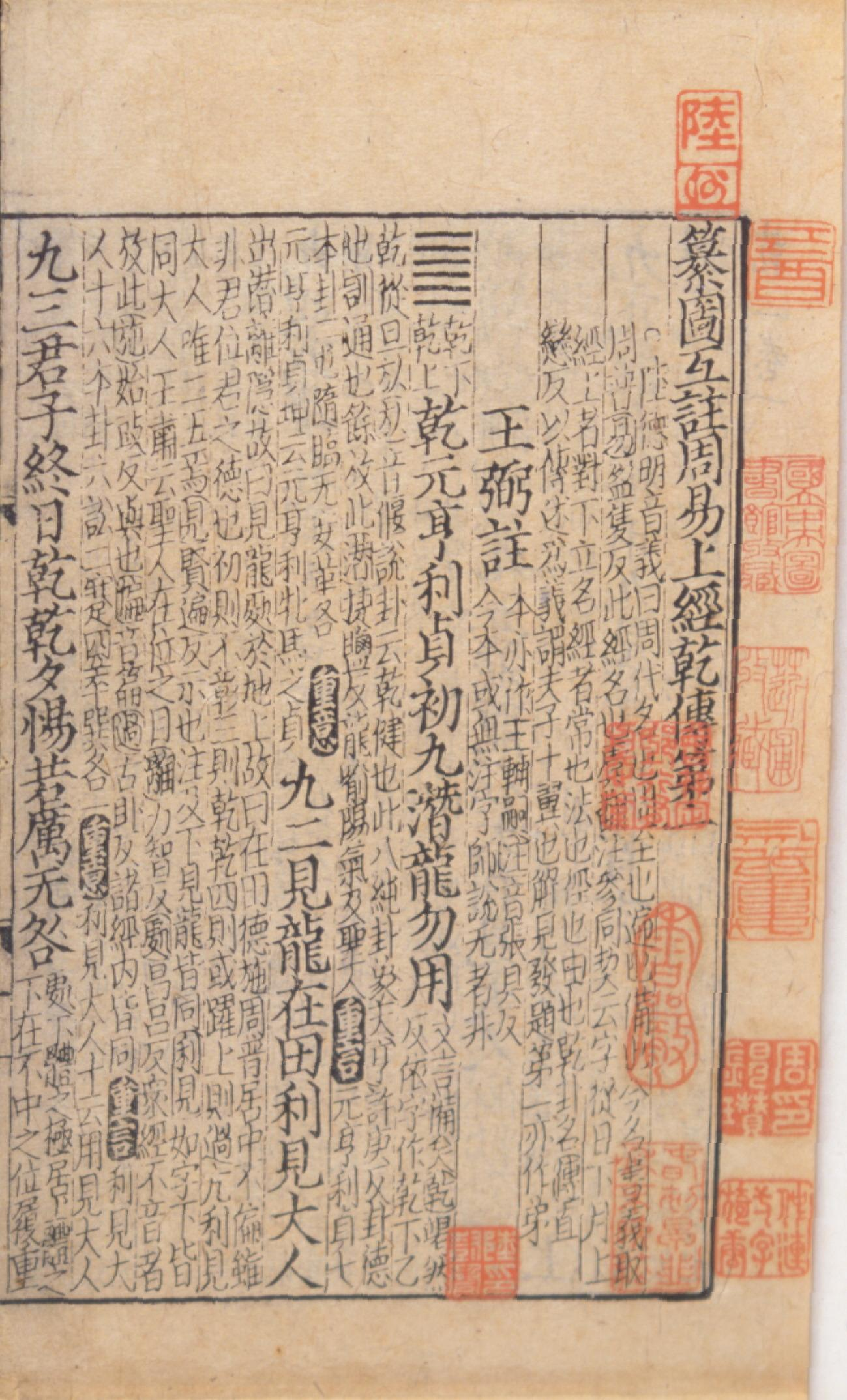
A Song dynasty (c. 1100) edition of the I Ching, a non-linear text used for divination.

Scholars have discussed a range of pre-digital precursors to electronic literature, from the ancient Chinese book the I Ching, to inventor John Clark's mechanical Latin Verse Machine (1830–1843) to the Dadaist movement's cut-up technique. Print novels that were designed to be read non-linearly, such as Julio Cortázar's Hopscotch (1963) and Vladimir Nabokov's Pale Fire (1962), are cited as "print antecedents" of electronic literature.

=== 1950s ===
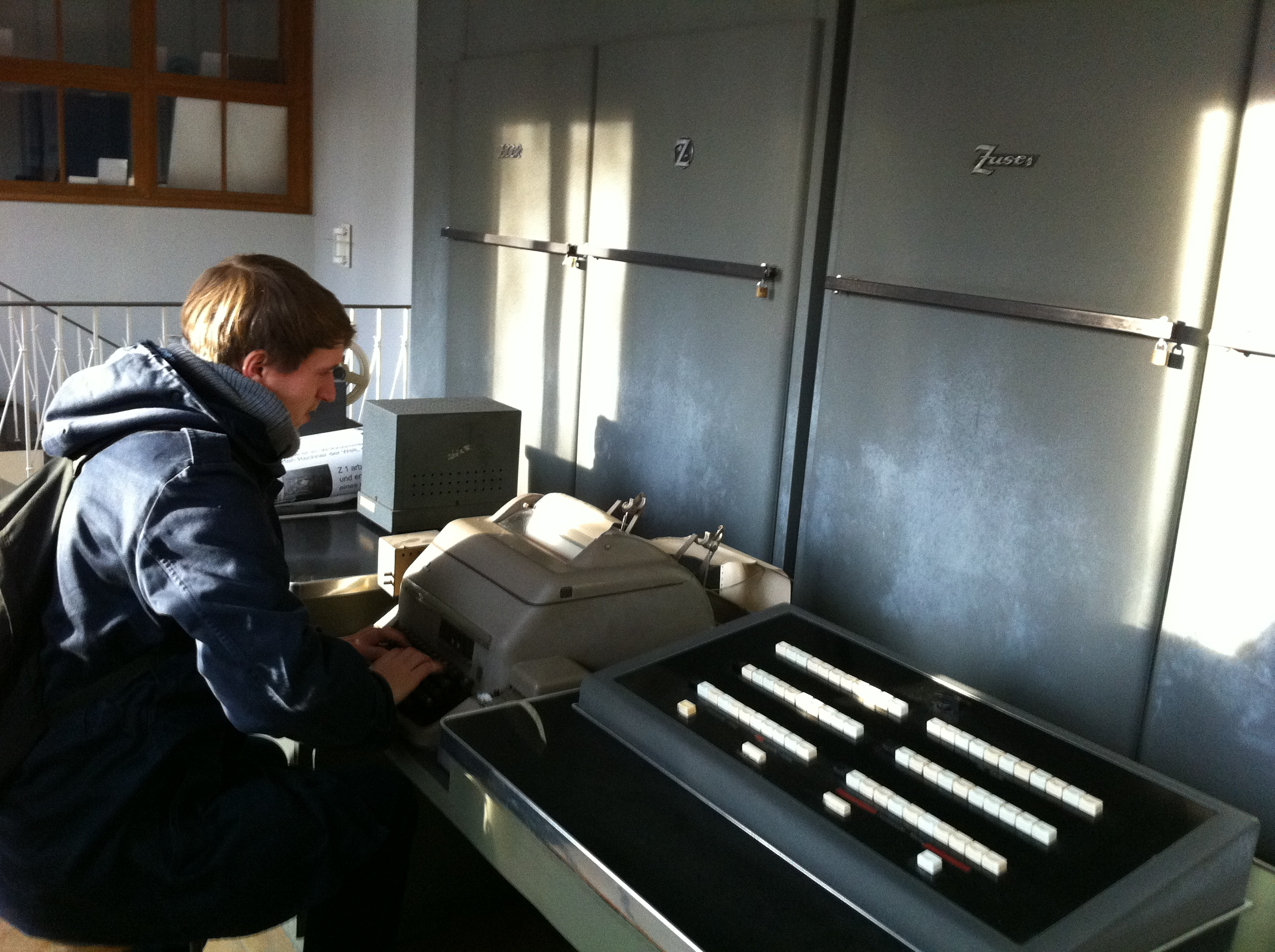
In 1959, Theo Lutz wrote a poetry generator for the Z22 computer. This photo shows a museum visitor sitting at the teletype that would have printed out poems.

The 1952 love letter generator that the British computer scientist Christopher Strachey wrote for the Manchester Mark 1 computer is probably the first example of literature that requires a computer to be generated or read. The work generates short love letters, and is an example of combinatory poetry, also called generative poetry. The original code has been lost, but digital poet and scholar Nick Montfort has reimplemented it based on remaining documentation of its output, and this version can be viewed in a web browser.

In 1959 the German computer scientist Theo Lutz wrote Stochastic Texts, which "for many years was considered the first digital literary text." Stochastic Texts was a program written for a Z22 computer that "produced random short sentences based on a corpus of chapter titles and subjects from Franz Kafka's novel The Castle.

=== 1960s ===
The 1960s were a time of literary experimentation, and there were strong connections between the art and technology scenes and concrete poetry. The Italian poet and artist Nanni Balestrini's poem Tape Mark I was composed in 1961 on an IBM 7070, and output from the poetry generator was published in a special issue of a journal edited by the novelist and scholar Umberto Eco and artist Bruno Munari, thus standing as the first Italian work of electronic literature. Auto-Beatnik (1961) was a program by R. M. Worthy and colleagues at the computer manufacturing company Librascope. Auto-Beatnik generated poems on an LGP-30 computer to mimic the style of Beat poetry.

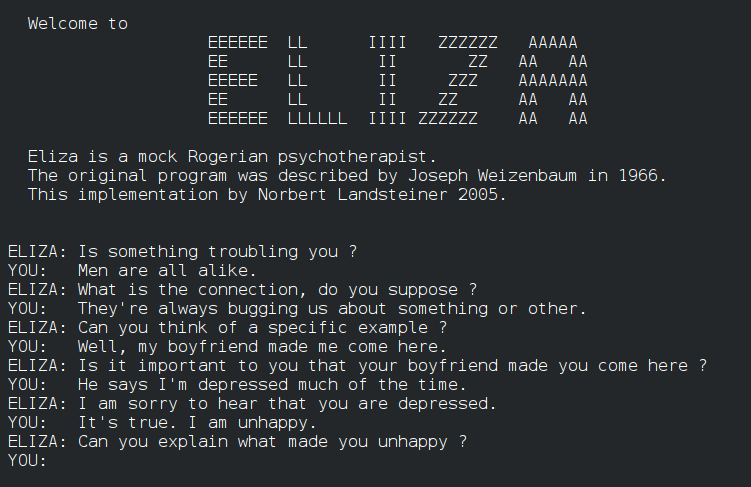
ELIZA was the first chatbot.

Games designers Mabel Addis and William McKay's text-based narrative game The Sumerian Game (1964–66) was probably the first narrative computer game, although it was not widely distributed. The computer scientist Joseph Weizenbaum programmed the chatbot ELIZA in 1966, establishing a new genre of conversational literary artefacts or bots. This was the decade when the sociologist and philosopher Ted Nelson coined the terms hypertext and hypermedia.

=== 1970s ===
Writers and artists continued to experiment with combining art, technology and literature. An example is the installation Blikk (1970) by a Norwegian trio: artist Irma Salo Jæger, composer Sigurd Berge and poet Jan Erik Vold. Vold's readings of his poems were mixed as sound montages by Berge and combined with Jæger's kinetic sculptures in an exhibition at the Henie Onstad Art Center. The work was recreated in 2022 by the composer and curator Jøran Rudi and is now part of the permanent collection of the Norwegian National Museum.

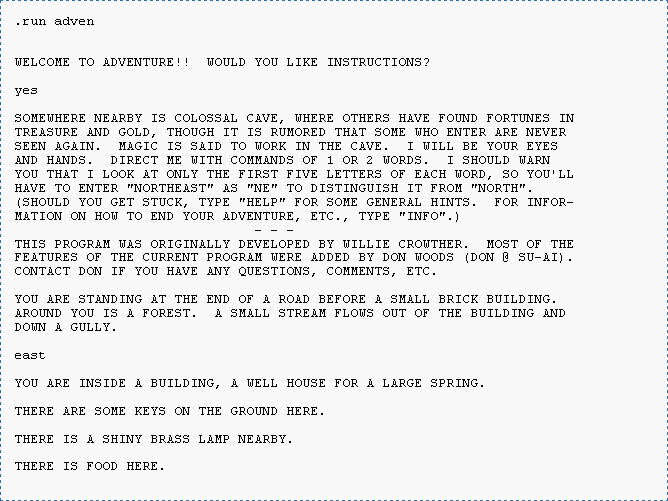
Crowther and Woods' 1977 game Colossal Cave Adventure

Another important development in the 1970s was the popularity of text adventure games, now more commonly known as interactive fiction. In 1975–76, Will Crowther programmed a text game named Adventure (also known as Colossal Cave Adventure or ADVENT). It possessed a story that had the reader make choices on which way to go. These choices could lead the reader to the end, or to their untimely death. It is often regarded as the first work of interactive fiction, although others have argued that the earlier simulated microworld SHRDLU, Gregory Yob's 1973 command-line game Hunt the Wumpus or Mabel Addis's The Sumerian Game computer simulation from 1964 should be considered interactive fiction or at least as an important precursor to Adventure. Historians agree that Adventure made a "significant cultural impact" in the 1970s. It has been called a "classic" "so foundational it started a genre", "the Gilgamesh of video games", and is credited with having "informed and inspired generations of players." Adventure was played on mainframe computers, and spread rapidly through the ARPANET. Colossal Cave inspired many other games, including the text adventure game Zork (1977) which was regarded as one of the best known.

=== 1980s ===
With the advent of personal computers, interactive fiction became a commercially successful genre, driven by companies like Infocom. Companies hired authors and programmers to write text adventure games, as Veronika Megler, who wrote The Hobbit video game in 1982, described in an interview with The Guardian.

For hypertext fiction and digital poetry, the eighties were a time of experimentation in separate communities that were not necessarily aware of each other. In Canada, the poet Bp Nichol published First Screening: Computer Poems, written in BASIC, in 1984. The Californian writer Judy Malloy published Uncle Roger on the online community The WELL in 1986/87. On the East Coast, hypertext fiction was being explored by academics and writers who met at the ACM Hypertext conference, which held its inaugural meeting in 1987. Michael Joyce's afternoon, a story, one of the most cited works of hypertext fiction, was demonstrated at the 1987 conference, and Mark Bernstein published this work at Eastgate Systems. The hypertext author Stuart Moulthrop described discovering writer and visual artist Judy Malloy's work at this time, not having realised that there were other people writing literature for computers: "I can remember coming away from that moment thinking that, you know, there might be a real hope for what we were trying to do because other people were doing it".

In France at this time, literature numérique (digital literature) was connected to the Oulipo literary movement, and poetry was more central to the French writers than the narrative genres like hypertext fiction that were popular in the United States. Generative poetry could be seen as a particularly European genre at the time. In 1981 the Portuguese author Pedro Barbosa published the combinartory work THE ALAMO, and explicitly made the claim that computationally generated works could be literary.

Not only writers, but also digital artists created works with strong literary components that have had an influence on the field of electronic literature. An example is the Australian artist Jeffrey Shaw and Dirk Groeneveld's The Legible City, which was first exhibited at ZKM Center for Art and Media Karlsruhe in 1988. The Legible City is an art installation where the visitor rides a stationary bicycle through a simulated city displayed as computer-generated text. Buildings and streets are shown as 3D shapes consisting of letters and words, allowing the reader to "read" the city as they pedal through it.

=== 1990s ===
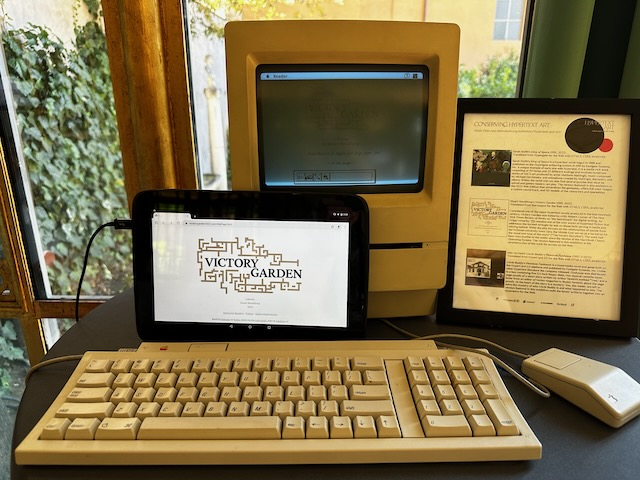
Stuart Moulthrop's hypertext fiction Victory Garden (1992) is shown here in two versions: the original, published on floppy disks to be read on a computer, and the 2009 version that was reprogrammed to work on an iPad. This display was part of an exhibition curated by Dene Grigar for the ACM Hypertext conference in 2023.

The "Storyspace school" characterised the early 1990s in the United States, consisting of works created using Storyspace, hypertext authoring software developed by the literary scholar Jay David Bolter and the author Michael Joyce in the 1980s. Bolter and Joyce sold the Storyspace software in 1990 to Eastgate Systems, a small software company that became a publishing house and the main distributor of hypertext fiction in the 1990s, particularly in the early 1990s before it was possible to publish works on the web. Eastgate has maintained and updated the code in Storyspace up to the present. Storyspace and similar programs use hypertext to create links within text. Literature using hypertext is frequently referred to as hypertext fiction. Originally, these stories were often disseminated on discs and later on CD-ROM. Hypertext fiction is still being created today using not only Storyspace, but other programs such as Twine.

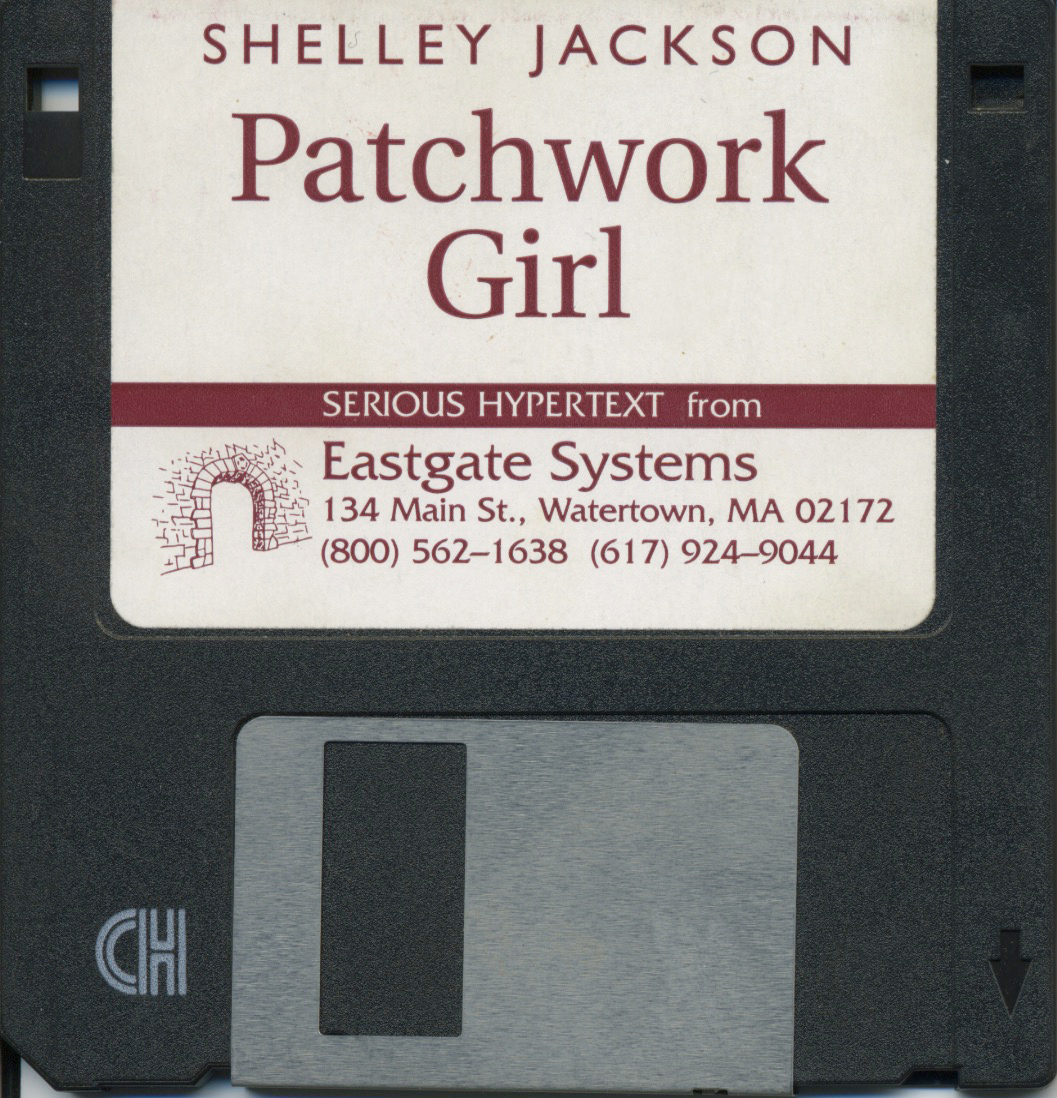
Eastgate Systems sold works of hypertext fiction on diskettes by mail order.

This period is often termed the "first-generation hypertext era," as N. Katherine Hayles notes that these works used lexias or separate screens in a similar manner to books and pages. In a 1993 article for the New York Times Book Review, "Hyperfiction: Novels for the Computer", the novelist and professor Robert Coover noted the new possibilities for exploring these various storyworlds: "[I]t is a strange place, hyperspace, much more like inner space than outer, a space not of coordinates but of the volumeless imagination". Key works from this period include Stuart Moulthrop's Victory Garden, Shelley Jackson's Patchwork Girl (1995) and Deena Larsen's work.

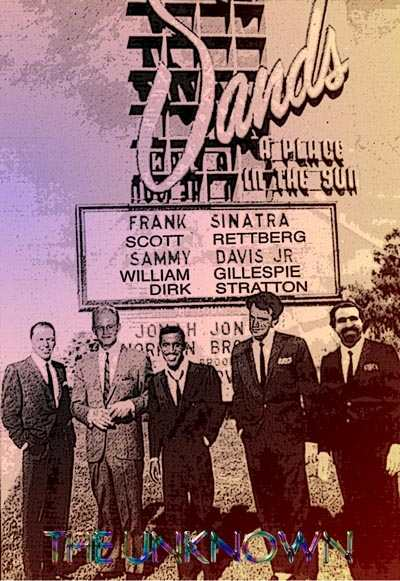
The Unknown used pastiche and comedy, mixing fact and fiction in a story of a book tour.

Towards the middle of the decade, authors began writing on the web. Stuart Moulthrop's Hegirascope and Mark Amerika's Hypertextual Consciousness were both published in 1995. Other early web-based hypertext fictions include Olia Lialina's My Boyfriend Came Back from the War, Adrienne Eisen's Six Sex Scenes and Robert Arellano's Sunshine '69, all published in 1996. Mark Amerika released GRAMMATRON on June 26, 1997, the same day the work was featured in the New York Times. Scott Rettberg, William Gillespie, Dirk Stratton, and Frank Marquadt's sprawling hypertext novel The Unknown won the trAce/Alt-X Hypertext Competition in 1998. It was featured in the Electronic Literature Collection Vol. 2, and has been analysed by a number of scholars.

The Electronic Literature Organization (the ELO) was founded in 1999 by hypertext author Scott Rettberg, the author and teacher of creative writing Robert Coover and internet investor Jeff Ballowe, with the mission "to facilitate and promote the writing, publishing, and reading of literature in electronic media". The ELO is still active today, with annual conferences, online discussions and publications.

The late 1990s also saw the first online literary journals, also known as webzines or e-zines. Online journals that published electronic literature included Beehive, founded by Talan Mammott in 1998, The Iowa Review Web, founded by Thom Swiss in 1999, Riding the Meridian, founded by Jennifer Ley in 1999, Cauldron.net, founded by Claire Dinsmore in 1999, Drunken Boat, founded by Ravi Shankar and Michael Mills in 2000, and poemsthatgo.com, founded by Megan Sapnar and Ingrid Ankerson in 2000. The electronic book review was an online journal founded by Joseph Tabbi that published criticism and essays often discussing electronic literature.

=== 2000s ===
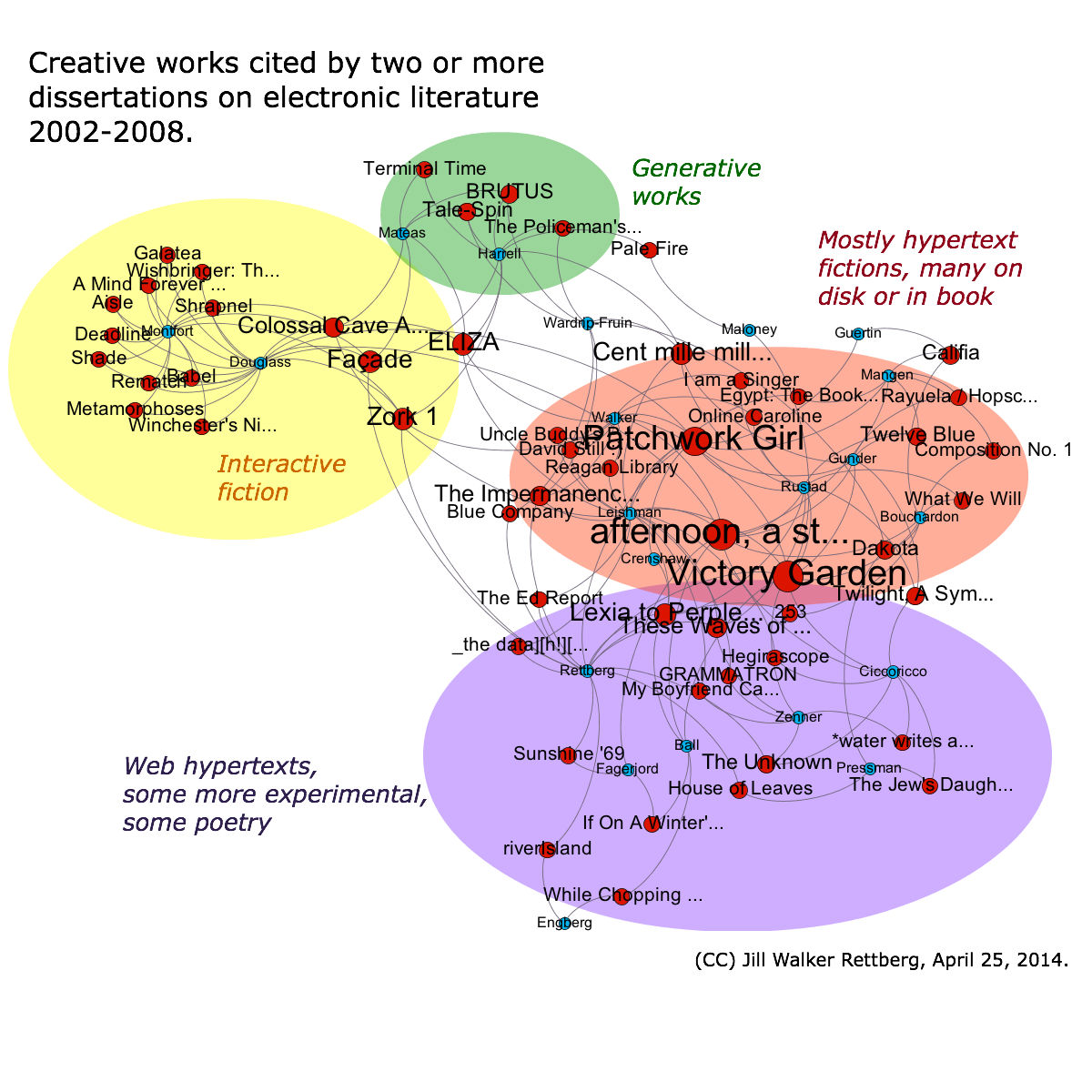
A network visualisation showing works of electronic literature cited by two or more PhD dissertations on electronic literature defended between 2002 and 2008. Four clear genres emerge: interactive fiction, generative works, hypertext fictions and more experimental web hypertexts and poetry.

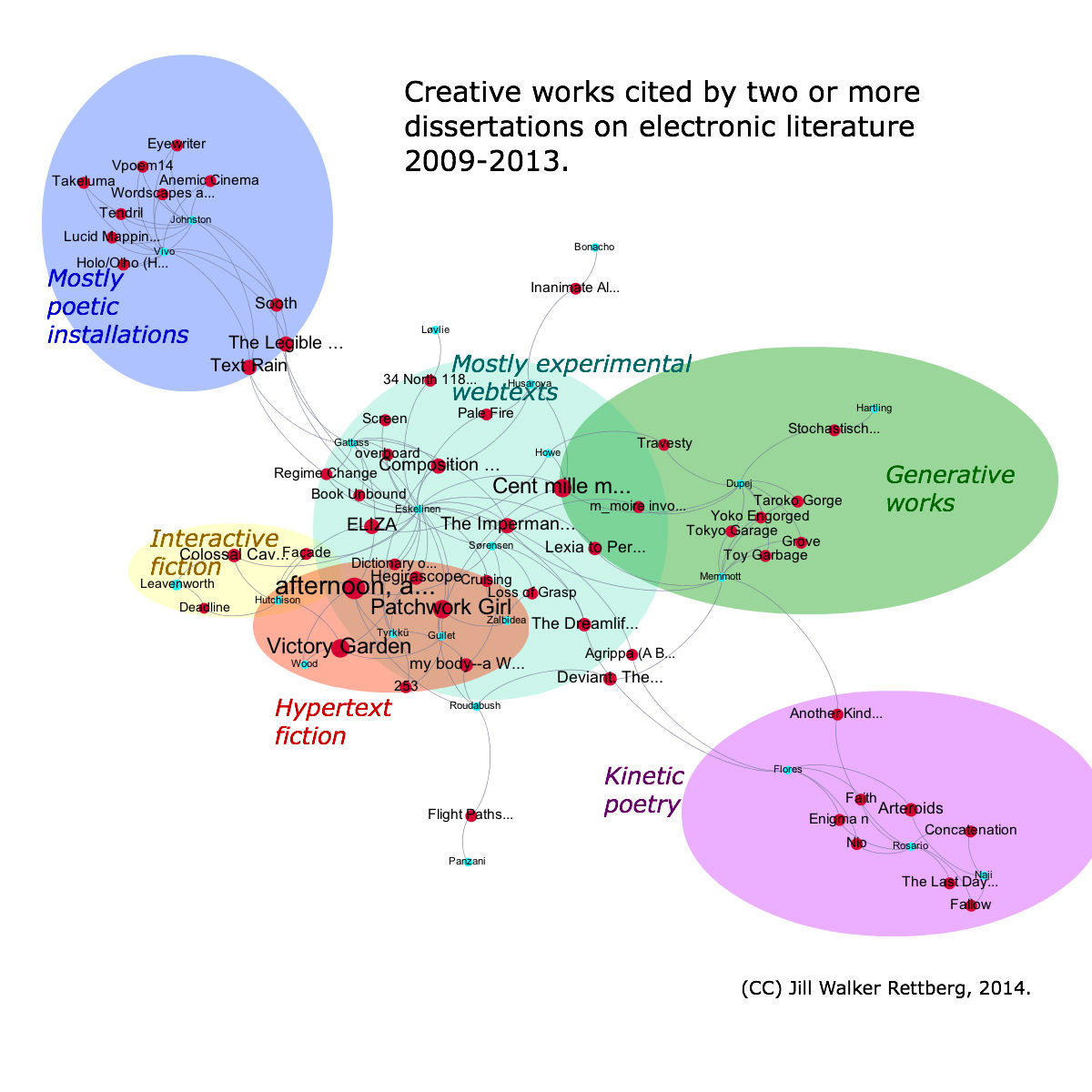
PhD dissertations on electronic literature completed between 2009 and 2013 show a shift in genres. Classic hypertext fiction is still present (the red circle), as are the experimental webtexts, interactive fiction and generative works. Two new distinct genres have emerged as important to this generation of dissertation writers: kinetic poetry and digital poetry installation art.

In Japan, cell phone novels became popular from the early 2000s. Similar genres emerged in other countries where text messaging was well-established, including India and Europe. The first work of Indian electronic literature is probably the 2004 SMS novel Cloak Room, whose author used the pseudonym RoGue. Cloak Room invited readers to engage with the story by answering texts or leaving comments on the blog that was used in tandem with the text messages.

In North America the web was becoming the main platform for electronic literature. The Canadian author Caitlin Fisher's These Waves of Girls (2001) was a hypermedia novella telling stories of girlhood, using images and sounds as well as links and text. The American author Talan Memmott's Lexia to Perplexia (2000) offered complex visual and textual layers that sometimes confuse and occlude themselves, and is described by the literary critic Lisa Swanstrom as a "beautifully intricate piece of electronic literature". Kate Pullinger's Inanimate Alice is an example of a work that began as a web novel and then saw versions across several media, including a screenplay and a VR experience. Early works were concerned with erasure and experimented with technology. Works like The Impermanence Agent, by author and scholar Noah Wardrip-Fruin and collaborators, explored the web's ability to customize a story for the reader. Works like database by Adriana de Souza e Silva used a printer, video camera, and a database to erase stories "in real time".

An analysis of 44 PhD dissertations about electronic literature published between 2002 and 2013 found a clear shift in the genres referenced by the authors of the dissertations during this period. Between 2002 and 2008, the referenced works clustered in four distinct genre groups: interactive fiction, generative literature, classic hypertext fiction (mostly published on disk or in print) and web hypertexts, including more experimental works and some poetry.

Blog fiction and fan fiction are born-digital literary genres that became popular in this period. Blog fictions have been a particularly popular genre of electronic literature in Africa. The literary orality of blogs has also been analysed as a feature of African American blogs.

=== 2010s ===
The spread of smartphones and tablets led to literary works that explored the touchscreen, such as Samantha Gorman and Danny Cannizarro's Pry (2014) or Kate Pullinger's Breathe: A Ghost Story (2018). Netprov, improvisational and collaborative networked writing was another genre that developed during the 2000s and 2010s, with projects like #1WkNoTech. Instapoetry, a visual style of poetry native to Instagram became a popular success, and works like Shelley Jackon's Snow combined place-specific performance with social media reporting on the work.

The web-based hypertext authoring tool Twine became increasingly popular this decade. This "Twine revolution" led to a resurgence of interactive fiction and hypertext, which now became "a mainstream form of literary game production and interaction". Notable works written in Twine that are frequently discussed as electronic literature include Anna Anthropy's Queers in Love at the End of the World (2013) and Dan Hett's autobiographical C ya laterrrr about losing his brother in the Manchester Arena bombing (2017).

As machine learning made rapid advances with natural language processing and deep learning, authors began to experiment and write with AI. David Jhave Johnston's ReRites is an example of this new kind of generative literature and is a poetic work written as a human-AI collaboration. A GPT-2 language model was trained on a corpus of contemporary poetry and set to generate new poems every night. Each morning, Jhave Johnston would rewrite the poems as a daily ritual: hence the title ReRites.

Dissertations published between 2009 and 2013 still cite many works in the genres of hypertext fiction, interactive fiction, experimental webtexts and generative texts. Digital poetry also emerged as a significant genre, with dissertation authors writing about two distinct clusters of digital poetry: kinetic poetry and poetic installations in art galleries. Many of these works were from the 1980s to the early 2000s, so this may indicate an uptake in scholarly interest rather than a large change in what kinds of creative works were actually published in the 2010s.

=== 2020s ===
Electronic literature spread internationally. The Electronic Literature Collection Volume 4, published in 2022, showcases 132 works from 42 different countries in 31 languages. The first volume of the Indian Electronic Literature Anthology, published in 2024, showcases 17 works of electronic literature written in Hindi and English.

== Scholarship ==
=== Histories and timelines ===
Various histories of electronic literature and its subgenera have been written. Scott Rettberg's Electronic Literature provides a broad overview, while more specialised books discuss the history of specific genres or periods, like Chris Funkhouser's Prehistoric Digital Poetry and Astrid Ensslin's Pre-web Digital Publishing and the Lore of Electronic Literature.

As mentioned above in the section on Definitions, the literary critic Leonardo Flores proposes a generational understanding of electronic literature, where the first generation is pre-web, the second uses the web, and the third generation uses social media, web APIs and mobile devices. However, not all works fit within this structure, as Spencer Jordan notes, writing that "A work such as The Unknown, for example, sits uneasily between second and third generation definitions."

=== Reader interaction and nonlinearity ===
Digital literature tends to require a user to traverse through the literature through the digital setting, making the use of the medium part of the literary exchange. Espen J. Aarseth wrote in his book Cybertext: Perspectives on Ergodic Literature that "it is possible to explore, get lost, and discover secret paths in these texts, not metaphorically, but through the topological structures of the textual machinery". Espen Aarseth defines "ergodic literature" as literature where "nontrivial effort is required to allow the reader to traverse the text". George Landow explains that following hypertext links merges the traditional expectations of reader and writer roles as the reader constructs the text by following links.

Astrid Ensslin and Alice Bell note that electronic literature works can embody central contradictions in ways that differ from print literature. They cite examples such as afternoon, a story (a car accident that may not or may occur), Victory Garden (a character both dies and lives), and Patchwork Girl (a character is real or imagined). Plot lines, emotional intensity, character traits and attributions can vary depending on a reader's chosen path. J Yellowlees Douglas shows an early example of this in Michael Joyce's 1991 hypertext fiction WOE where romances would occur between different characters, depending on a reader's path. Encountering a node (or lexia) in different contexts can convey impressions of larger databases as information seems to differ depending on the context that the user is coming from, as J Yellowlees Douglas explains about The Election of 1912, by Mark Bernstein and Erin Sweeney.

== Translation and global perspectives ==
Translating electronic literature needs to consider the programming aspects.

Electronic literature currently has a global outreach. The 2020 Electronic Literature Collection Volume 4 had 132 literary works from 42 author nationalities in 31 languages.

=== Electronic literature in China ===
Chinese online literature has a rich history and is very popular, but it differs from electronic literature in focusing on online publication and interaction between readers and authors rather than digital aesthetic devices like interactivity, text-generation, or animation. Academic Guobin Yang defined internet literature in a Chinese context as "all web-based writings that are viewed as literature by their authors or readers." According to academic Michel Hockx, Chinese internet literature either "in established literary genres or in innovative literary forms" is "written especially for publication in an interactive online context and meant to be read on screen." An example of Chinese electronic literature that uses digital affordances is Shan Shui, a 2014 work that combines generative poetry with images.

== Preservation and archiving ==
Because electronic literature is made to be read on computers within their original software, as Jessica Pressman explains that electronic literature analysis demands that readers and critics examine the media and technology. However, works often become unreadable when the software platforms or technologies they are designed for become obsolete. This may have made it more difficult for electronic literature to build the "traditions associated with print literature", as literary critic N. Katherine Hayles has argued.

=== Archives and collections ===
Several organizations are dedicated to preserving works of electronic literature. The UK-based Digital Preservation Coalition aims to preserve digital resources in general, while the Electronic Literature Organization's PAD (Preservation / Archiving / Dissemination) initiative gave recommendations on how to think ahead when writing and publishing electronic literature, as well as how to migrate works running on defunct platforms to current technologies. The British Library archives winners of the New Media Writing Prize in the UK Web Archive. The NEXT, run by Dene Grigar for the Electronic Literature Organization, hosts source files and documentation of many works of electronic literature and digital writing. The Maryland Institute for Technologies in the Humanities and the Electronic Literature Lab at Washington State University Vancouver work towards the documentation and preservation of electronic literature and hypermedia. The Electronic Literature Collection is a series of anthologies of electronic literature published by the Electronic Literature Organization, both on CD/DVD and online, and this is another strategy in working to make sure that electronic literature is available for future generations.

=== Databases and metadata ===
Works of electronic literature are rarely findable in library catalogues because they are published outside the mainstream publishing system and lack ISBNs and other conventional metadata. Several databases have been developed to document works of electronic literature and make them more findable. CELL, or the Consortium on Electronic Literature, is a group of databases that connects entries about works to Wikibase items.

Key databases of electronic literature include:

- The Electronic Literature Knowledge Base (ELMCIP) is a research resource for electronic literature hosted at the University of Bergen, with 3,875 records of creative works as of February 11, 2024.
- The Electronic Literature Directory focuses on peer-reviewed descriptions or reviews of works.
- The Multilingual African Electronic Literature Database & African Diasporic Electronic Literature Database (MAELD & ADELD) is a project focusing on the African region. In Canada, the Laboratory NT2 hosts research and a database on electronic literature and digital art.

== Major awards ==
Annual awards for electronic literature include the Electronic Literature Organization awards and the New Media Writing Prize.

Previous awards included the trAce-Alt X Competition. In 1998, two works shared the 1,000 English pound prize: The Unknown by William Gillespie; Scott Rettberg; Dirk Stratton and Rice by Jenny Weight (Australia). Three sites received Honorable Mentions: Kokura by Mary-Kim Arnold, **** by Michael Atavar, and water always writes in plural by Linda Carroli and Josephine Wilson. In 2001, Lexia to Perplexia by Talan Memmott won the trAce/Alt-X New Media Writing Award. In 2004, the prize had four major categories for articles about hypertext (reviews, opinion, and editor's choice. The only multimedia work mentioned was Postcards From Writing by Sally Prior.

== See also ==
- List of electronic literature authors, critics, and works
- List of women electronic literature writers
