= Astrid Ensslin =

Digital humanities scholar and games researcher (fl. 21st c.)

Astrid Christina Ensslin
- Born: Stuttgart, Germany
- Education: University of Heidelberg
- Scientific career
- Fields: English literature, Digital literature

Astrid Christina Ensslin is a German digital culture scholar, and Professor of Dynamics of Virtual Communication Spaces at the University of Regensburg. Ensslin is known for her work on digital fictions and video games, and her development of narratological theory to encompass digital narratives.

== Biography ==
Ensslin received an undergraduate certificate in violin performance and music pedagogy from the Stuttgart Academy of Music and Performing Arts in 1996 and a BA/MA in English and German from the University of Tübingen in 2002. In 2006 she completed her PhD on digital literature and hypertexts at Heidelberg University, where it was short-listed for the Ruprecht-Karl's Award for outstanding scholarly and scientific research. In May 2012 she became a fellow of the Royal Society of Arts. Ensslin has received numerous awards for her research, teaching and supervision.

Ensslin is the founding and principal editor of the journal Journal of Gaming and Virtual Worlds, a review board member of the journal Game Studies, and a member of the editorial boards of Discourse, Context & Media and Digital Culture & Society. She joined the board of directors of the Electronic Literature Organization in October 2017.

From 2021 to 2022, she was Professor of Digital Culture at the University of Bergen and Professor of Media and Digital Communication.

From 2016 to 2020, she was a Professor in Digital Humanities and Game Studies at the University of Alberta.

== Essays ==
- "'I Want to Say I May Have Seen My Son Die This Morning': Unintentional Unreliable Narration in Digital Fiction." Paper given at the 2009 Narrative Conference, University of Birmingham, 4–6 June 2009.
- "From (W)reader to Breather: Cybertextual Retro-intentionalisation in Kate Pullinger et al.'s 'Breathing Wall'". New Narrative: Theory and Practice. Ed. Ruth Page & Bronwen Thomas. Lincoln, NE: University of Nebraska Press, 2010a.
- "From Revisi(tati)on to Retro-intentionalisation: Hermeneutics, Multimodality and Corporeality in Hypertext, Hypermedia and Cybertext." Reading Moving Letters: Digital Literature in Research and Teaching. Ed. Roberto Simanowski, Peter Gendolla, Thomas Kniesche and Joergen Schaefer. Bielefeld: transcript, 2010b. 145-162.
- "Respiratory narrative: Multimodality and cybernetic corporeality in 'physio-cybertext'". New Perspectives on Narrative and Multimodality. Ed. Ruth Page. London: Routledge, 2009. 155-65.
- "Ensslin, Astrid. & Bell, Alice. Eds. New Perspectives on Digital Literature: Criticism and Analysis. Special Issue of dichtung-digital 37 (2007). 18 November 2009. http://www.dichtung-digital.de/
- Ensslin, Astrid, and Alice Bell. “‘Click = Kill’: Textual You in Ludic Digital Fiction.” Storyworlds: A Journal of Narrative Studies, vol. 4, 2012, pp. 49–73. Available at https://shura.shu.ac.uk/12558/.

== Books ==
- 2024. Reading Digital Fiction: Narrative, Cognition, Mediality (Routledge). With Alice Bell.
- 2022. Pre-web Digital Publishing and the Lore of Electronic Literature. (Cambridge University Press).
- 2021. Digital Fiction and the Unnatural: Transmedial Narrative Theory, Method, and Analysis. (Ohio State University Press). With Alice Bell.
- 2019. Approaches to Videogame Discourse: Lexis, Interaction, Textuality. (Bloomsbury). With Isabel Balteiro.
- 2018. Small Screen Fictions (Paradoxa). With Lisa Swanstrom and Pawel Frelik.
- 2014. Literary Gaming (MIT Press).
- 2013. Analyzing Digital Fiction (Routledge). With Alice Bell and Hans K. Rustad.
- 2011. The Language of Gaming (Palgrave).
- 2011. Creating Second Lives: Community, Identity and Spatiality as Constructions of the Virtual (Routledge). With Eben Muse.
- 2007. Canonizing Hypertext: Explorations and Constructions (Bloomsbury). Reviewed in Electronic Book Review, April 5, 2020
- 2007. Language in the Media: Representations, Identity, Ideology (Bloomsbury). With Sally Johnsson.
