= Hypertext fiction =

Genre of electronic literature

- Features: Narrative literature consisting of sections of text connected by links; usually digital. A genre of electronic literature.

Related genres
- Electronic literature, Interactive fiction, Digital poetry, Generative literature, Cell phone novels, Instapoetry, Cybertext, Creepypasta, Fan fiction, Blog fiction

Hypertext fiction is a genre of electronic literature characterized by the use of hypertext links that provide a new context for non-linearity in literature and reader interaction. The reader typically chooses links to move from one node of text to the next, and in this fashion arranges a story from a deeper pool of potential stories. Its spirit can also be seen in interactive fiction.

The term can also be used to describe traditionally published books in which a nonlinear narrative and interactive narrative is achieved through internal references. James Joyce's Ulysses (1922), Enrique Jardiel Poncela's La Tournée de Dios (1932), Jorge Luis Borges' The Garden of Forking Paths (1941), Vladimir Nabokov's Pale Fire (1962), Julio Cortázar's Rayuela (1963; translated as Hopscotch), and Italo Calvino's The Castle of Crossed Destinies (1973) are early examples predating the word "hypertext", while a common pop-culture example is the Choose Your Own Adventure series in young adult fiction and other similar gamebooks, or Jason Shiga's Meanwhile, a graphic novel that allows readers to choose from a total of 3,856 possible linear narratives.

In 1969, IBM and Ted Nelson from Brown University gained permission from Nabokov's publisher to use Pale Fire as a demonstration of an early hypertext system and, in general, hypertext's potential. The unconventional form of the demonstration was dismissed in favour of a more technically oriented variant.

== Definitions ==
There is little consensus on the definition of hypertext literature. The similar term cybertext is often used interchangeably with hypertext. In hypertext fiction, the reader assumes a significant role in the creation of the narrative. Each user obtains a different outcome based on the choices they make. Cybertexts may be equated to the transition between a linear piece of literature, such as a novel, and a game. In a novel, the reader has no choice, as the plot and the characters are all chosen by the author; there is no 'user', just a 'reader'. This is important because it entails that the person working their way through the novel is not an active participant. In a game, the person makes decisions and decides what actions to take, what punches to punch, or when to jump.

To Espen Aarseth, cybertext is not a genre in itself; in order to classify traditions, literary genres and aesthetic value, texts should be examined at a more local level. To Aarseth, hypertext fiction is a kind of ergodic literature:

In ergodic literature, nontrivial effort is required to allow the reader to traverse the text. If ergodic literature is to make sense as a concept, there must also be nonergodic literature, where the effort to traverse the text is trivial, with no extranoematic responsibilities placed on the reader except (for example) eye movement and the periodic or arbitrary turning of pages.

To Aarseth, the process of reading immersive narrative, in contrast, involves "trivial" effort, that is, merely moving one's eyes along lines of text and turning pages; the text does not resist the reader.

== History ==
The first hypertext fictions were published prior to the development of the World Wide Web, using software such as Storyspace and HyperCard. Noted pioneers in the field are Judy Malloy and Michael Joyce.

Early hypertext fictions published on the web include Olia Lialina's My Boyfriend Came Back from the War (1996), which used images, words and web frames to unfold spatially in the reader's web browser, and Adrienne Eisen's hypertext novella Six Sex Scenes (1996), in which readers moved between lexias by selecting links at the bottom of each screen. The first novel-length hypertext fiction, or hypertext novel, was Robert Arellano's Sunshine 69, published on June 21, 1996, with navigable maps of settings, a nonlinear calendar of scenes, and a character "suitcase" enabling readers to try on nine different points of view. Shortly thereafter, in 1997, Mark Amerika released GRAMMATRON, a multi-linear work that was eventually exhibited in art galleries. In 2000, it was included in the Whitney Biennial of American Art.

Some other web examples of hypertext fiction include Stuart Moulthrop's Hegirascope (1995, 1997), The Unknown (which won the trAce/Alt X award in 1998), The Company Therapist (1996–1999) (which won Net Magazine's "Entertainment Site of the Year"), and Caitlin Fisher's These Waves of Girls (2001) (which won the ELO award for fiction in 2001). More recent works include Stephen Marche's Lucy Hardin's Missing Period (2010) and Paul La Farge’s Luminous Airplanes (2011).

In the 1990s, women and feminist artists took advantage of hypertext and produced dozens of works, often publishing on CD-ROM. Linda Dement’s Cyberflesh Girlmonster (1995) is a hypertext CD-ROM that incorporates images of women’s body parts and remixes them to create new shapes. Dr. Caitlin Fisher’s hypertext novella These Waves of Girls (2000) is set in three time periods as the protagonist explores her queer identity through memory. The story is written as a reflective diary of the interconnected memories of childhood, adolescence, and adulthood. It consists of an associated multi-modal collection of nodes including linked text, still and moving images, manipulable images, animations, and sound clips. It won the Electronic Literature Organization award.

The internationally oriented, but US based, Electronic Literature Organization (ELO) was founded in 1999 to promote the creation and enjoyment of electronic literature. Other organisations for the promotion of electronic literature include trAce Online Writing Community, a British organisation, started in 1995, that has fostered electronic literature in the UK, Dichtung Digital, a journal of criticism of electronic literature in English and German, and ELINOR, a network for electronic literature in the Nordic countries, which provides a directory of Nordic electronic literature. The Electronic Literature Directory lists many works of electronic literature in English and other languages.

=== Forms ===
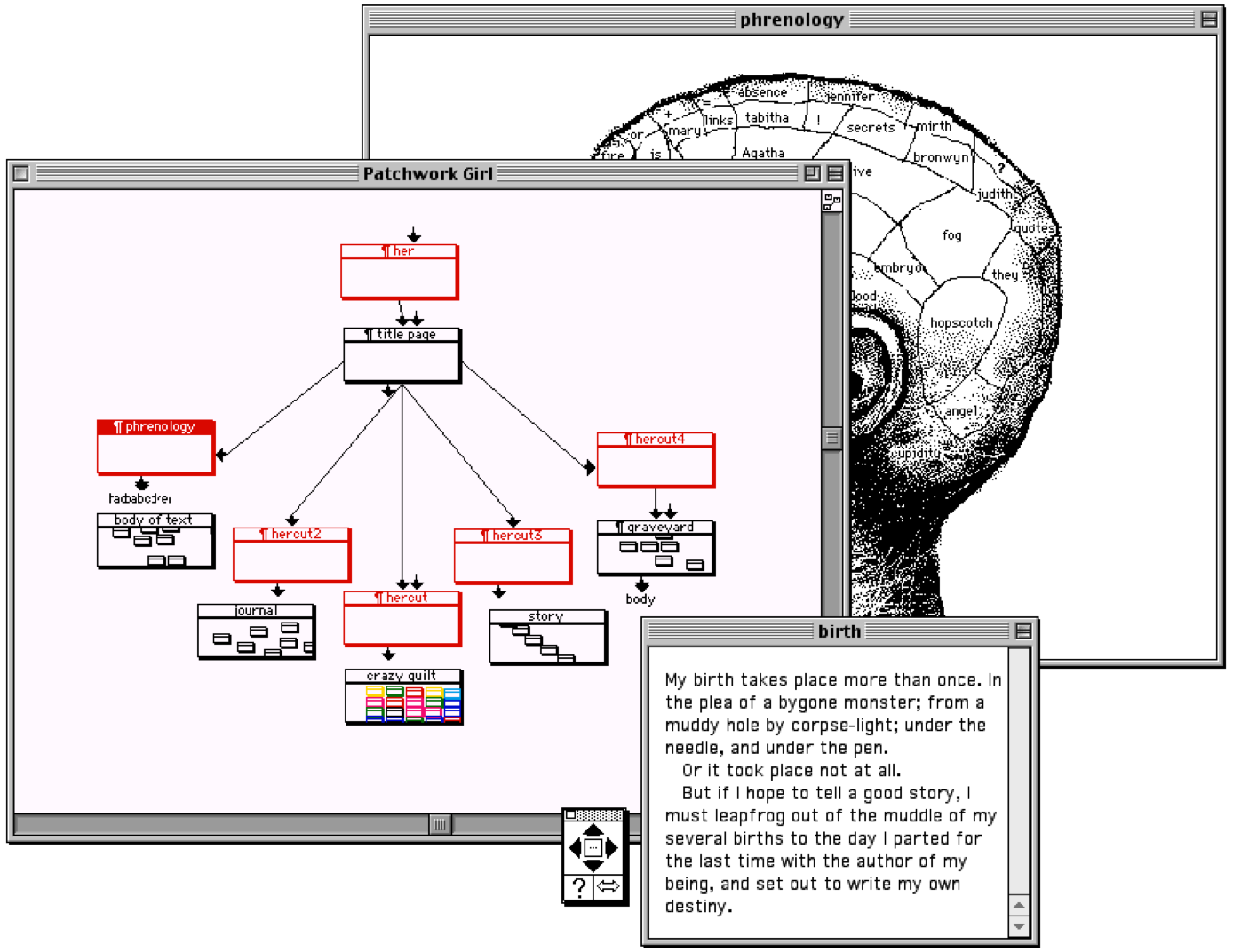
A screenshot from a reading of Shelley Jackson's Patchwork Girl, where windows layer on top of each other

There are various forms of hypertext fiction, each of which is structured differently.

In his 1994 book Hyper/Text/Theory, George Landow differentiated between axial and networked hypertext fiction, where axial hypertext are "translations" of linear texts into hypertext where the reader follows links from one node to the next in a linear fashion, whereas networked hypertexts are interconnected so the reader can take many different paths through the text.

In 2007 David Ciccoricco expanded this to three basic categories, not just two, adding the term arborescent hypertext fiction to Landow's axial and networked hypertexts. Arborescent hypertexts have branching structures that have mutually exclusive story elements. The reader makes choices that change not just the order of reading, but the outcome of the story.

Hypertexts can use more than one of these forms. For example, Ciccoricco describes Stuart Moulthrop's Victory Garden as using both networked and arborescent structure, which is important to the resolution of the narrative.

== Criticism ==
In 2013, Steven Johnson, founder of the online magazine FEED, an early publisher of hypertext fiction, wrote an article for Wired detailing why hypertext fiction did not become popular, claiming that non-linear stories are difficult to write, since each section of the work would need to introduce characters or concepts.

== Legacy ==
Twine fictions have often been cited as being a direct descendant of hypertext fiction.

== See also ==
- 34 North 118 West
- 253 (novel)
- 17776
- Cybertext
- Eastgate Systems
- Electronic literature
- Gamebook
- Homestuck
- Hypertext poetry
- Interactive fiction (IF)
- SCP Foundation
- Storyspace
- Twine (software)
- Visual novel

== Bibliography ==
- Cicconi, Sergio (2000). "The Shaping of Hypertextual Narrative". The Integrated Media Machine: A Theoretical Framework, ed. M. Yla-Kotola, J. Suoranta, S. Inkinen & J. Rinne. Helsinki: University of Lapland. 101-120.
- Allen, Michael (2003). "This Is Not a Hypertext, But...: A Set of Lexias on Textuality". CTheory. Archived from the original on 2020-07-01.
- "The hypertext Tristram Shandy page", David R. Hammontree's page
- The Non-linear Tradition in Literature from The Electronic Labyrinth by Christopher Keep, Tim McLaughlin and Robin Parmar
- Malloy, Judy (1998). "Hypernarrative in the Age of the Web". Portions of Which Were Published on the National Endowment for the Arts Web Site.
- Ensslin, Astrid (2007). Canonizing Hypertext: Explorations and Constructions. London: Continuum.
