= Lexia (hypertext) =

Text unit or node in a literary hypertext

In hypertext, a lexia (plural lexias; from French lexie, lexies; etymologically from Greek: λέξις "diction, word") is a text unit that links to other lexias, corresponding to a node in a network. This use of the term was introduced by George Landow in 1992, based on Roland Barthes' coinage of lexie in S/Z (1970) to refer to a "unit of reading." The term is used in scholarship on hypertext, although the English word node is also used with the same meaning.

Barthes proposed that any text could be divided into "a series of brief, continuous fragments, which we shall call lexias, since they are units of reading." These are not necessarily present in the text before it is read, and can be "arbitrary, but useful" in analysis.

In hypertext, on the other hand, the division between lexias is apparent in the physical text. The reader must usually click a link to move from one lexia (or node) to the next.

George Landow, writing in 1992, was one of the first scholars to analyse literary hypertexts. The term lexia was a key term for him in developing his theoretical and analytical approach to the new genre of hypertext fiction. Landow defines hypertext thus: "Hypertext, as the term will be used in the following pages, denotes text composed of blocks of text — what Barthes terms a lexia — and the electronic links that join them." Scholars have noted that Landow actually uses the term lexia quite differently from Barthes.

== See also ==
- Hypertext fiction
- Cybertext
