= Scott Rettberg =

American-Norwegian digital culture professor and author

Scott Rettberg Ph.D.
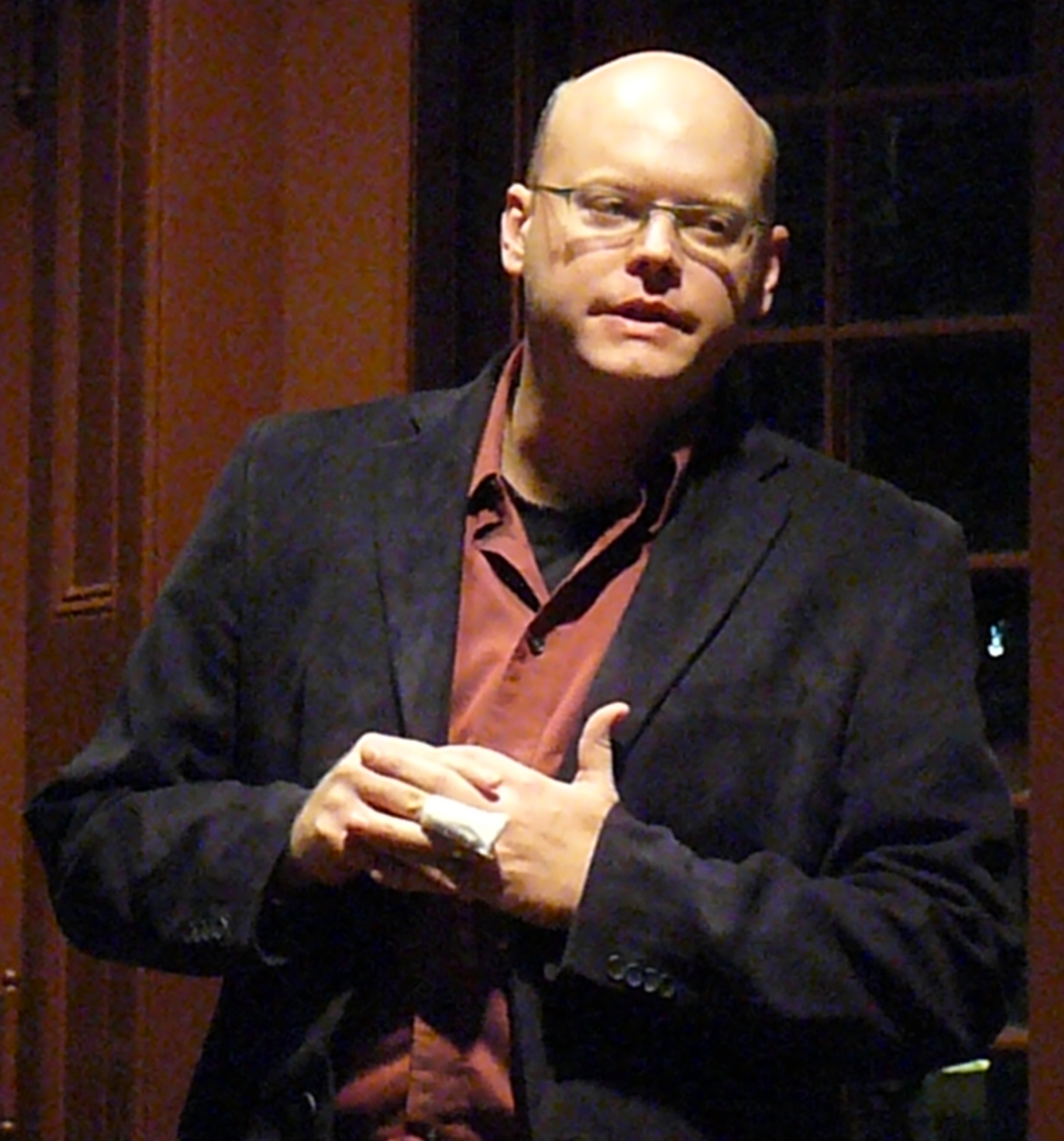
- In 2011
- Scientific career
- Fields: Electronic literature, digital humanities
- Workplaces: University of Bergen
- Website: www.uib.no/en/persons/Scott.Robert.Rettberg

Scott Rettberg is an American digital artist and scholar of electronic literature based in Bergen, Norway. He is the co-founder and served as the first executive director of the Electronic Literature Organization. He leads the Center for Digital Narrative, a Norwegian Centre of Research Excellence from 2023 to 2033.

== Scholarship ==
Rettberg is a professor of Digital Culture in the Department of Linguistic, Literary, and Aesthetic Studies at the University of Bergen, Norway. He is the author of the book Electronic Literature, which won the N. Katherine Hayles Award for Criticism of Electronic Literature in 2019, described by Kathi Inman Berens as "a definitive overview of electronic literature". He has co-edited a number of academic collections, including Electronic Literature Communities.

Rettberg was the project leader of the HERA-Funded ELMCIP research project (2010–13), and is the director of the ELMCIP Electronic Literature Knowledge Base.

== Literary and artistic career ==
Rettberg became known as an author of hypertext fiction in the 1990s. His first major project was the collaborative web novel The Unknown, A Hypertext Novel, which was written in collaboration with William Gillespie, Dirk Stratton, and Frank Marquadt, and won the trAce/Alt-X Hypertext Competition 1998. It was also featured in the Electronic Literature Collection Vol. 2, and has been analysed by a number of scholars.

Rettberg's cinematic collaboration with Roderick Coover, Hearts and Minds: The Interrogations Project, received the Robert Coover Award in 2016. The annual award is given by the Electronic Literature Organization each year in recognition of an outstanding work of electronic literature.

The combinatory film Toxi-City: A Climate Change Narrative was created with Roderick Coover, and is described as a film that "shape-shifts each time it plays; an algorithm selects fragments from each of the six narratives and reconfigures them to create an ever-changing, yet thematically consistent, production"

In 2023 Rettberg began experimenting with using ChatGPT and DALL-E to generate narratives that "neither human nor AI could have created alone", including the project Republicans in Love.

== The Electronic Literature Organization ==
Rettberg co-founded the Electronic Literature Organization with Robert Coover and Jeff Ballowe in 1999.

== Selected bibliography ==
- Electronic literature, (Basingbroke: Polity, 2018. ISBN 978-1509516773)
