= List of authors of electronic literature =

Electronic literature is a literary genre defined as "born digital" works that use computational media to create artistic literary effects with an expanded repertoire that goes well beyond words.

See the overall links to electronic literature authors, critics, resources, and works.

Names not yet covered by Wikipedia articles should be adequately referenced. This is an ongoing Wikipedia Project.)

== Early prototype electronic literature writers ==
Electronic literature involves works that incorporate extra elements, such as visual or aural components, as an integral part of the work. Proto-electronic literature writers include: Theresa Hak Kyung Cha. Concrete poetry is also an early precursor for electronic literature.

== Creative authors ==
=== A ===
- Antoni Abad (born 1956) is a Spanish artist who began his career as a sculptor, and evolved over time towards video art and later in net.art and other forms of new media.
- Annie Abrahams (born 1954) is a Dutch performance artist specializing in Video installations and internet based performances, often deriving from collective writings and collective interaction.
- Kathy Acker (1947–1997) was an American experimental novelist, poet, playwright, essayist, critic, performance artist, and postmodernist writer, known for her idiosyncratic and transgressive writing that dealt with complex themes such as childhood trauma, sexuality, language, identity, and rebellion.
- Mabel Addis (1912–2004) was an American writer, teacher and the first video game writer.
- Amy Alexander an artist and researcher working in audio/visual performance, interactive art and software art, under a number of pseudonyms including VJ Übergeek and Cue P. Doll.
- Naomi Alderman (born 1974) is an English novelist, game writer, and television executive producer.
- Laurie Anderson (born 1947) is an American avant-garde artist, musician and filmmaker whose work encompasses performance art, pop music, and multimedia projects.
- Anna Anthropy is an American video game designer, role-playing game designer, and interactive fiction author whose works include Mighty Jill Off and Dys4ia.
- Kate Armstrong is a Canadian artist, writer and curator with a history of projects focusing on experimental literary practices, networks and public space.
- Robert Arellano (born 1969) is an American writer, musician and educator from Talent, Oregon.

=== B ===
- Pat Badani is a Canadian interdisciplinary artist, writer/editor, and researcher whose works promote ecological balance and sustainable human-world relations.
- Cheryl Ball (born 1973) is an independent academic and scholar in rhetoric, composition, and publishing studies, and executive director for the Council of Editors of Learned Journals (CELJ).
- Zoe Beloff (born 1958) is an artist residing in New York who works primarily in installation art, film, and drawing.
- Caroline Bergvall (born 1962) is a French-Norwegian poet who has lived in England since 1989, and whose work includes adapting Old English and Old Norse texts into audio text and sound art performances.
- Lillian-Yvonne Bertram is an American poet known for their work on poetry and digital storytelling.
- Mark Bernstein is an American publisher, scholar, and writer of hypertext/electronic literature.
- Carroll Parrott Blue (1943–2019) was an American filmmaker, director and author.
- Stephanie Boluk is an academic, and game designer. Research areas include game studies, game design, media studies, computer history, and electronic literature.
- Natalie Bookchin is an artist based in Brooklyn, New York, and is well known for her work in media.
- Serge Bouchardon, Loss of Grasp, is a writer and research based in Paris, France.
- Laura Borràs (born 1970) is a Spanish philologist, academic and politician from Catalonia.
- Amaranth Borsuk (born 1981) is an American poet and educator known for her experiments with textual materiality and digital poetry.
- Mez Breeze is an Australian-based artist and practitioner of net.art, working primarily with code poetry, electronic literature, mezangelle, and digital games.
- Amy Briggs (born 1962) is an American video game implementor known for creating Plundered Hearts, an interactive fiction computer game published by Infocom in 1987.
- Jennifer Brozek (born 1970) is an American freelance author, game design writer, editor, and small press publisher.
- Nancy Buchanan (born 1946) is an American visual artist, known for her work in installation, performance, and video art. She played a central role in the feminist art movement in Los Angeles in the 1970s.
- Oni Buchanan (born 1975) is an American poet, and pianist.

=== C ===
- Janet Cardiff (born 1957) is a Canadian artist who works chiefly with sound and sound installations, often in collaboration with her husband and partner George Bures Miller.
- J. R. Carpenter (born 1972) is a British-Canadian artist, writer, and researcher working across performance, print, and digital media.
- John Cayley (born 1956) is a Canadian pioneer of writing in digital media as well as a theorist of the practice, a poet, and a professor of Literary Arts at Brown University since 2007.
- Lynn Cherny (born 1967) is a Boston-based data analysis consultant specialized in data mining and analysis, customer research, and interface design.
- Lynda Clark (born 1981) is an author and creator of interactive fiction. Her short story, "Ghillie's Mum" won the Commonwealth Short Story Prize for Europe and Canada in 2018, and was shortlisted for the BBC National Short Story Award in 2019.
- Robert Coover (1932–2024) was an American novelist, short story writer, and T. B. Stowell Professor Emeritus in Literary Arts at Brown University. He is generally considered a writer of fabulation and metafiction. He became a proponent of electronic literature and was a founder of the Electronic Literature Organization.
- Allison Craighead (born 1971) is a London-based visual artist, who works with video, sound, and the internet.
- Kathryn Cramer (born 1962) is an American science fiction writer, Literary editor, and literary critic.
- Jackie Craven is an American poet and author with a broad background in arts and the humanities.

=== D ===
- Sharon Daniel is a digital media artist and a professor in the Film and Digital Media department and serves as chair for the Digital Arts and New Media MFA program at the University of California, Santa Cruz.
- Gloriana Davenport (born 1944) is an American artist, media maker, and conservationist.
- Caterina Davinio (born 1957) is an Italian poet, novelist and new media artist.
- Francesca da Rimini (aka Doll Yoko or GashGirl) is an Australian artist.
- Christy Dena is an Australian writer, game designer, and scholar. Her scholarship and design practice in transmedia storytelling has been widely cited, especially for promoting the term "cross-media storytelling".
- Adriana De Souza is a Brazilian/American communication professor, information technologist, academic, and the author of several books on mobile communication, mobile art, and games.
- Debra Di Blasi (born 1957) is a teacher, an artist, and award-winning multi-genre author.
- William Dickey (1928–1994) was a pioneer in HyperCard poetry
- Claire Dinsmore (born 1961) is a new media and crafts artist.
- Claire Donato (born 1986) is an American writer and multidisciplinary artist based in Brooklyn, NY.
- J. Yellowlees Douglas (born 1962) is a pioneer author and scholar of hypertext fiction.
- Tony Dove is an artist known for creating unique and highly imaginative embodied hybrids of film, installation, and performance, in which performers and participants use interface technologies like motion sensing to interact with unfolding narratives and "perform" on-screen avatars.
- Johanna Drucker (born 1952) is an American author, book artist, visual theorist, and cultural critic.
- Jacek Dukaj (born 1974) is a Polish science fiction and fantasy writer.
- Kate Durbin is an American, Los Angeles, California-based writer, digital and performance artist.

=== E ===
- Jorge Eduardo Eielson was a Peruvian writer and pioneer in merging poetry with computer algorithms in the 1970s.
- Lori Emerson is an associate professor at the University of Colorado at Boulder and founder of the Media Archaeology Lab, a museum dedicated to obsolete technologies spanning from the late nineteenth century to the twenty-first century. She is known for her work in media archaeology, digital preservation, and digital archives.
- Astrid Ensslin is a German digital culture scholar, and Professor of Dynamics of Virtual Communication Spaces at the University of Regensburg. Ensslin is known for her work on digital fictions and video games, and her development of narratological theory to encompass digital narratives.
- Heid E. Erdrich (born 1963) is a poet, editor, and writer.
- Tina Escaja (born 1965) is a Spanish-American writer, activist, feminist scholar and digital artist based in Burlington, Vermont.

=== F ===
- Edward Falco is an American author, playwright, electronic literature writer, and new media editor.
- Natalia Fedorova is a new media scholar, artist, and translator. Her works include avant-garde poetry, kinetic poetry, concrete poetry, hyperfiction, literary text generators and video poetry.
- Angela Ferraiolo is a systems artist, writer, and filmmaker working with adaptive systems, noise, randomness, & generative processes. Her artwork explores open-endedness, self-organization, morphogenesis, and adaptive processes.
- Caitlin Fisher is a Canadian media artist, poet, writer, futurist and Professor of Cinema and Media Arts at York University in Toronto where she also directs the Immersive Storytelling Lab and the Augmented Reality Lab.
- Kathleen Fitzpatrick is an American scholar of digital humanities and media studies.
- Mary Flanagan is an American artist, author, educator, and designer in the field of game studies. She is the founding director of the research laboratory and design studio Tiltfactor Lab at Dartmouth College.
- Vera Frenkel RCA FRSC (born 1938) is a Canadian multidisciplinary artist based in Toronto. Her installations, videotapes, performances and new media projects address the forces at work in human migration, the learning and unlearning of cultural memory, and the ever-increasing bureaucratization of experience.

=== G ===
- Belén Gache (born 1960) is an Argentine-Spanish novelist and experimental writer.
- Dora García (born 1965) is a contemporary Spanish artist. García draws on interactivity and performance in her work, using the exhibition space as a platform to investigate the relationship between artwork, audience, and place.
- Jacalyn Lopez Garcia (born 1953) is a multimedia Chicana artist and activist, whose work focuses on photography and digital art.
- Alex Gil (born 1973) is a scholar of digital humanities and Caribbean studies.
- Loss Pequeño Glazier is the creator of books of print poetry, digital poems, theoretical texts, and performance works. Glazier stands among literary figures at the "forefront of the digital poetics movement.
- Samantha Gorman is an American game developer known for her combination of narrative, theatricality and gaming in VR environments, and for introducing gestural interactions in touchscreen narratives.
- Jo-Anne Green (born 1959) is a printmaker, visual artist, artist, arts administrator, writer, and educator.
- Dene Grigar is a digital artist and scholar based in Vancouver, Washington. She was the president of the Electronic Literature Organization from 2013 to 2019. As director of the Electronic Literature Lab at Washington State University, Vancouver, Grigar collects, preserves, and analyzes digital media.
- Diane Gromala (born 1960) is a Canada Research Chair and a professor in the Simon Fraser University School of Interactive Arts and Technology. Her research works at the confluence of computer science, media art and design, and has focused on the cultural, visceral, and embodied implications of digital technologies, particularly in the realm of chronic pain.
- Carolyn Guertin is a Canadian artist, scholar, and author. Guertin is known for critical writing related to cyberfeminism, born-digital arts, participatory cultures, theoretical work in emergent media arts and literatures, global digital culture, information aesthetics, hacktivism, tactical media, and the social practices surrounding technology.
- Juan B. Gutierrez (born 1973) is an American mathematician and author of Colombian origin, known primarily for his theoretical and practical contributions in the field of electronic literature.

=== H ===
- Dame Wendy Hall DBE FRS FREng MAE FIET (born 1952) is a British computer scientist. She is Regius Professor of Computer Science at the University of Southampton.
- Amira Hanafi (born 1979) is an American-born poet and artist who has published several works of electronic literature.
- Auriea Harvey is an artist who collaborates with Michaël on creating art video games. From 2018 to 2024, Harvey was Professor of Games at the Kunsthochschule Kassel.
- N. Katherine Hayles (born 1943) is an American literary critic, most notable for her contribution to the fields of literature and science, electronic literature, and American literature. Her scholarship primarily focuses on the "relations between science, literature, and technology".
- Young-Hae Chang Heavy Industries is a Seoul-based Web art group consisting of Young-Hae Chang and Marc Voge, formed in 1999.
- Amy Hennig (born 1964) is an American video game writer and director, formerly for the video game company Naughty Dog.
- Dan Hett is a digital artist, writer and games designer from Manchester, UK. He is also a member of the Algorave live coding electronic music and visuals movement, performing under the name Rituals.
- Richard Holeton (born 1952) is an American writer and higher-education administrator. His creative works are foundational in the hypertext and electronic literature genres.
- Janet Holmes is an American poet and academic, and the director of Ahsahta Press.
- Elliott Holt is an American fiction writer and former ad copywriter.
- Reham Hosny Academic and award-winning digital creative writer with a multicultural and interdisciplinary background working across the US, the UK, and Egypt.
- Kathy Rae Huffman is an American curator, writer, producer, researcher, lecturer and expert for video and media art. Since the early 1980s, Huffman is said to have helped establish video and new media art, online and interactive art, installation and performance art in the visual arts world.
- Andrew Hussie (born 1979) is an American author and artist.

=== J ===
- Shelley Jackson (born 1963) is an American writer and artist known for her cross-genre experimental works.
- Helen Varley Jamieson is a digital media artist, playwright, performer, director and producer from New Zealand. She "is engaged in an ongoing exploration of the collision between theatre and the internet."
- Natalie Jeremijenko AO (born 1966) is an Australian environmental artist and engineer whose background includes studies in biochemistry, physics, neuroscience and precision engineering.
- David Jhave Johnston is a Canadian poet, videographer, and motion graphics artist working chiefly in digital and computational media,. and a researcher at the Center for Digital Narrative at the University of Bergen. This artist's work is often attributed, simply, to the name Jhave.
- Michael Joyce (born 1945) is a retired professor of English at Vassar College, New York, US. He is a pioneer creator and critic of electronic literature.

=== K ===
- Eduardo Kac (born 1962) is a Brazilian and American contemporary artist whose portfolio encompasses various forms of art including performance art, poetry, holography, interactive art, digital and online art, and BioArt.
- Yael Kanarek (born 1967) is an Israeli American artist based in New York City that is known for pioneering use of the Internet and of multilingualism in work of art.
- Jayne Fenton Keane is a contemporary Australian poet and poetry performer. She is known for making innovative use of multimedia including Adobe Flash, for publishing her poetry on the web, and for poetry performance.
- Robert Kendall is a digital poet, composer, writer, photographer, and Web artist.
- Judith Kerman (fl 1970s–2020s), American poet creating generative works
- Lisbeth Klastrup (born in 1970) is a Danish scholar of digital and social media. Although her early research was on hypertext fiction, she is now best known for her research on transmedial worlds, social media, and death.
- Norman M. Klein born 1945) is an American urban and media historian, as well as an author of fictional works.
- Allison Knowles (born 1933) is an American visual artist known for her installations, performances, sound works, and publications. Knowles was a founding member of the Fluxus movement, an international network of artists who aspired to merge different artistic media and disciplines.

=== L ===
- Antoinette LaFarge is a new media artist and writer known for her work with mixed-reality performance and projects exploring the conjunction of visual art and fiction.
- Tina La Porta (born 1967) is a Miami-based digital artist who "focuses on issues surrounding identity in the virtual space". Her early work could be characterized as net:art or internet art.
- Deena Larsen (born 1964) is an American new media and hypertext fiction author involved in the creative electronic writing community since the 1980s.
- Brenda Laurel (born 1950) is an American interaction designer, Video game designer, and researcher. She is an advocate for diversity and inclusiveness in video games, a "pioneer in developing virtual reality", a public speaker, and an academic.
- Cynthia Lawson is a digital artist, educator, and technologist.
- Rebecca Levine is a British author and editor.
- Olia Lialina (born 1971) is an Internet artist and theorist, an experimental film and video critic and curator.
- Jayen Loader (born 1951) is an American director and writer best known for the 1982 Cold War documentary The Atomic Cafe.
- Christine Love (born 1989) is a Canadian independent video game developer and writer.
- Eric Loyer is a digital artist whose work examines identity and memory in the context of new modes of communications afforded by media technologies.
- Marjorie Luesebrink, (pseudonym M.D. Coverley, 1943–2023) was an American hypermedia fiction writer, scholar, and teacher. A pioneer born-digital writer, she is part of the first generation of electronic literature authors and a founding board member and past president of the Electronic Literature Organization.

=== M ===
- Kathy Mac/Kathleen McConnell is a Canadian academic and writer. A professor of English literature at St. Thomas University in Fredericton, New Brunswick, she has published both academic literature under her own name and poetry under the pen name Kathy Mac.
- Jackson Mac Low (1922–2004) was an American poet, performance artist, composer and playwright, known to most readers of poetry as a practitioner of systematic chance operations and other non-intentional compositional methods in his work.
- Judy Malloy (born 1942) is an American poet whose works embrace the intersection of hypernarrative, magic realism, and information art. Malloy has composed works in both new media literature and hypertext fiction. She was an early creator of online interactive and collaborative fiction on The WELL and the website ArtsWire.
- Francesco Mariotti was one of the first Peruvian electronic literature writers to use AI.
- Cathy Marshall is a Principal Researcher in Microsoft Research's Silicon Valley Lab and an author of electronic literature. Marshall is mainly interested in studying human interaction when mediated by technology.
- Tim McLaughlin teaches, researches, and performs outreach in the use of 3D graphics for entertainment, design, education, training, and simulation. Tim's specific activities as a researcher include investigations into the uses of interactive and immersive 3D graphics for visual storytelling, collaborative tools for design, and animation systems.
- Christina McPhee (born 1954) is an American painter, new media and video artist.
- Talan Memmott (born 1964) is a digital writer/artist/theorist. Memmott has taught and been a researcher in digital art, digital design, electronic writing, new media studies, and digital culture.
- María Mencía is a Spanish-born media artist and researcher working as a Senior Lecturer at Kingston University in London, United Kingdom. Her artistic work is widely recognized in the field of electronic literature, and her scholarship on digital textuality has been widely published.
- Yucef Merhi (born 1977) is a Venezuelan artist, poet and computer programmer based in New York.
- Nick Montfort is an American computer scientist and poet who is a professor of digital media at Massachusetts Institute of Technology, where he directs a lab called The Trope Tank. His work aincludes digital projects, many of them in the form of short programs.
- Adalaide Morris (1898–1983) was an American artist, scholar, and critic for modern poetry including information art, counter mapping, documentary, and digital works.
- Stuart Moulthrop (born 1957) is an innovator of electronic literature and hypertext fiction, both as a theoretician and as a writer. He was a founding board member of the Electronic Literature Organization in 1999.
- Janet Murray (born 1946) is an American academic and scholar well known as an early developer of humanities computing applications, a seminal theorist of digital media, and an advocate of new educational programs in digital media.

=== N ===
- Jason Nelson is a digital and hypermedia poet, artist, and academic who is best known for his artistic flash games and essays. Nelson's style of Web art merges various genres and technologies, focusing on collages of poetry, image, sound, movement and interaction.
- Ruth Nestvold (born 1958) is an American Science fiction and Fantasy writer.

=== O ===
- Jaishree Odin s a literary scholar whose research relates to cultural studies of science and technology, literary and political ecology, ecology and ethics, system's ecology, and eco-literacy. Her work ranges from German philosophy and the feminist angle to mysticism.
- Heather Ordover is a former high school and university educator. Her podcast, CraftLit • work with your hands • read with your ears, has been in weekly production since 2006. The What Would Madame Defarge Knit? knitting series was created and edited by Ordover, featuring various designers' patterns based on characters from classic fiction covered on the CraftLit podcast.
- Karen O'Rourke is an artist and emeritus Professor at Jean Monnet University in Saint-Etienne. Her personal work tends to relate artistic practice to the notions of network, archiving and territory.

=== P ===
- Philip M. Parker (born 1960) is an American economist and academic. He has patented a method to automatically produce a set of similar books from a template that is filled with data from databases and Internet searches. He claims that his programs have written more than 200,000 books.
- Allison Parrish is an American poet, software engineer, creative coder, and game designer, notable as one of the most prominent early makers of creative, literary Twitter bots.
- Milorad Pavić (1929–2009) was a Serbian writer, university professor, translator, literary historian and academic.
- Celia Pearce (born 1961) is an American game designer and academic.
- Marjorie Perloff (1931–2024) was an Austrian-born American poetry scholar and critic, known for her study of avant-garde poetry.
- Judith Pintar is a sociologist and author of interactive fiction who teaches game studies and narrative design.
- Ine Poppe (born 1960) is a Dutch artist, journalist and writer.
- Porpentine Charity Heartscape (born 1987) is a video game designer, new media artist, writer and curator based in Oakland, California.
- Jessica Pressman is a scholar who studies electronic literature including digital poetry, media studies, and experimental literature. Her works examine how technologies affect reading practices that are displayed through several media forms.
- Kate Pullinger is a Canadian novelist and author of digital fiction, and a professor of Creative Writing at Bath Spa University, England.

=== Q ===
- Alissa Quart (born 1972) is an American nonfiction writer, critic, journalist, editor, and poet.
- Zoë Quinn (born 1987) is an American video game developer, programmer, and writer.

=== R ===
- Jean Rabe is an American journalist, editor, gamer and writer of fantasy and mystery.
- Melinda Rackham is an Australian writer, artist and curator. She is currently an adjunct research professor at the University of South Australia.
- Rita Raley is an American researcher who focuses on digital literature. Her research interests include new media, electronic literature, digital humanities, contemporary arts (literature, media), activism and social practices, tactical media, global English, discourse on globalization, and language and information politics.
- Sonja Rapoport (1923–2015) was an American conceptual, feminist, and New media artist. She began her career as a painter, and later became best known for computer-mediated interactive installations and participatory web-based artworks.
- Jill Walker Rettberg (born 1971) is co-director of the Center for Digital Narrative and Professor of Digital Culture at the University of Bergen. She is known for innovative research dissemination in social media and electronic literature.
- Scott Rettberg is an American digital artist and scholar of electronic literature based in Bergen, Norway. He is the co-founder and served as the first executive director of the Electronic Literature Organization.
- Margaret Rhee is a feminist experimental poet, new media artist, and scholar. Her research focuses on technology, and intersections with feminist, queer, and ethnic studies. She has a special interest on digital participatory action research and pedagogy.
- Marie-Laure Ryan is an independent literary scholar and critic. She has written several books and articles on narratology, fiction, and cyberculture and has been awarded several times for her work.

=== S ===
- Alexandra Saemmer is a French professor known for social semiotic research focusing on electronic literature and digital media and for her literary works, in particular digital poetry and narratives created for social media.
- Roque Salas Rivera (born 1985) is a bilingual Puerto Rican poet who writes in Spanish and English, focusing on the experience of being a migrant to the United States, the colonial status of Puerto Rico, and of identifying as a queer Puerto Rican and Philadelphian of non-binary gender.
- Michaël Samyn is an artist who collaborates with Auriea Harvey on creating art video games. Harvey and Samyn work as a team, although each has areas of specialization: Harvey in computer graphics and 3D modeling, Samyn in programming and sound.
- Cynthia Selfe is an author, editor, scholar, and teacher in the field of Writing Studies, with a speciality in the subfield of computers and composition.
- Phoebe Sengers is an American computer scientist and ethnographer, currently a professor at Cornell University with a joint appointment in the Department of Science & Technology Studies and the Department of Information Science.
- Christy Sheffield Sanford is an American new media writer, artist, editor, and project designer, who lives in Florida. She coined the term "web-specific" for her work.
- Emily Short is an interactive fiction (IF) writer. Short has been called "a visionary in the world of text-based games for years," and is the author of over forty works of IF.
- Lisa Smedman is a science fiction and fantasy author and journalist. Her novel Extinction, set in the Forgotten Realms universe, was a New York Times bestseller. Smedman first became known for gaming adventure novels, and later published her own independent fantasy novels
- Hazel Smith (born 1950s), Australian experimental and performance poet
- Sarah Smith (born 1947) is an American author and academic who went to work in the computer industry.
- Debra Solomon is an American filmmaker, animator, illustrator, and author. She has made a variety of short films, animated sketches, and title sequences since 1994. Many of her films focus on the struggles of womanhood and emphasizing the female identity with empowering images.
- Alan Sondheim is a poet, critic, musician, artist, and theorist of cyberspace from the United States.
- Cheryl Sourkes (born 1945) is a Canadian photographer, video and new media artist.
- Brian Kim Stefans (born 1969) is an American poet known for his work in experimental poetry and electronic literature. He is a professor of poetry, new media and screenplay studies in the English department of UCLA.
- Stephanie Strickland (born 1942) is a poet living in New York City. She has published ten volumes of print poetry and co-authored twelve digital poems.
- Kim Stringfellow (born 1963) is an American artist, educator, and photographer based out of Joshua Tree, California. Stringfellow has made transmedia documentaries of landscape and the economic effects of environmental issues on humans and habitat. Stringfellow's photographic and multimedia projects engage human/landscape interactions and explore the interrelation of the global and the local.
- Lisa Swanstrom is an American researcher in literature, media theory and the digital humanities.

=== T ===
- Christine Tamblyn (1951–1998) was an American feminist media artist, critic, and educator.
- Sue Thomas (born 1951) is an English author. Writing since the late 1980s, she has used both fiction and nonfiction to explore the impact of computers and the internet on everyday life. In recent years her work has focused on the connections between life, nature and technology.
- Helen Thorington (1928–2023) was an American radio artist, composer, performer, net artist and writer.
- Gianni Toti (1924–2007) was an Italian poet, writer, journalist, and cineaste.
- Penelope Trunk (born1966) is an American writer and entrepreneur.

=== U ===
- Ana María Uribe (1944–2004) was an Argentinian poet known for her work within electronic literature, particularly for visual poetry.
- Camille Utterback (born 1970 in Bloomington, Indiana) is an interactive installation artist. Initially trained as a painter, her work is at the intersection of painting and interactive art.

=== V ===
- Karen Villeda born 4 July 1985) is a Mexican writer, poet, and digital artist.

=== W ===
- Joanna Walsh is a multidisciplinary writer, editor and artist.
- Noah Wardrip-Fruin is a professor in the Computational Media department of the University of California, Santa Cruz, and is an advisor for the Expressive Intelligence Studio. In addition to his research in digital media, computer games, and software studies, he served for 10 years as a member of the board of directors of the Electronic Literature Organization.
- Rae White is a Brisbane-based poet and writer.
- Christine Wilks (born 1960) is a British digital writer and artist whose work in electronic literature has been published in online journals and anthologies.
- Roberta Williams (born 1953) is an American video game designer and writer.
- Josephine Wilson is an Australian academic and writer of essays, poetry, and fiction.
- Adrianne Wortzel (born 1941) is an American contemporary artist who uses robotics and interaction between humans and machines in her installations and performances. She has also created many online works of photography as well as electronic literature.
- Nanette Wylde is an American artist and writer. Wylde is known for her early incorporation of digital media as a fine art media, her work in net.art, electronic literature, and artwork which takes book form.

=== Y ===
- Jin-me Yoon (born 1960) is a South Korean-born internationally active Canadian artist who is a contemporary visual artist, using performance, photography and video to explore themes of identity as it relates to citizenship, culture, ethnicity, gender, history, nationhood and sexuality. Yoon's work is known for its use of humour and irony in its visual juxtapositions to the complex subject matter she examines.

=== Z ===
- Jaka Zeleznikar (born 1971) is a Slovenian artist known for his computational poetry and internet art. The base of his work is a nonlinear language-based expression combined with visual art.
- Jody Zellen (born 1961) is an American artist and educator. Her practice, consisting of digital art, painting, video art, and drawing, has been showcased by way of interactive installations, public art, and curated exhibitions. She is also known for her art criticism.
- Marina Zurkow (born 1962) is an American visual artist who works with media technology, animation and video. Her subject matter includes individual narratives, environmental concerns, and reflections on the relationship between species, or between humans, animals, plants and the weather.

== Electronic literature scholars and critics ==
- Espen J. Aarseth (born 1965) is a Norwegian academic specializing in the fields of video game studies and electronic literature.
- Cheryl Ball (born 1973) is an independent academic and scholar in rhetoric, composition, and publishing studies, and executive director for the Council of Editors of Learned Journals (CELJ).
- Jay David Bolter (born 1951) is the Wesley Chair of New Media and a professor in the School of Literature, Media, and Communication at the Georgia Institute of Technology. His areas of study include the evolution of media, the use of technology in education, and the role of computers in the writing process.
- John Cayley (born 1956) is a Canadian pioneer of writing in digital media as well as a theorist of the practice, a poet, and a professor of Literary Arts at Brown University since 2007.
- Robert Coover (1932–2024) was an American novelist, short story writer, and T. B. Stowell Professor Emeritus in Literary Arts at Brown University. He is generally considered a writer of fabulation and metafiction. He became a proponent of electronic literature and was a founder of the Electronic Literature Organization.
- Caterina Davinio (born 1957) is an Italian poet, novelist and new media artist.
- J. Yellowlees Douglas (born 1962) is a pioneer author and scholar of hypertext fiction.
- Johanna Drucker (born 1952) is an American author, book artist, visual theorist, and cultural critic.
- Lori Emerson is an associate professor at the University of Colorado at Boulder and founder of the Media Archaeology Lab, a museum dedicated to obsolete technologies spanning from the late nineteenth century to the twenty-first century. She is known for her work in media archaeology, digital preservation, and digital archives.
- Astrid Ensslin is a German digital culture scholar, and Professor of Dynamics of Virtual Communication Spaces at the University of Regensburg. Ensslin is known for her work on digital fictions and video games, and her development of narratological theory to encompass digital narratives.
- Kathleen Fitzpatrick is an American scholar of digital humanities and media studies.
- Alex Gil (born 1973) is a scholar of digital humanities and Caribbean studies.
- Loss Pequeño Glazier is the creator of books of print poetry, digital poems, theoretical texts, and performance works. Glazier stands among literary figures at the "forefront of the digital poetics movement.
- Dene Grigar is a digital artist and scholar based in Vancouver, Washington. She was the president of the Electronic Literature Organization from 2013 to 2019. As director of the Electronic Literature Lab at Washington State University, Vancouver, Grigar collects, preserves, and analyzes digital media.
- Diane Gromala (born 1960) is a Canada Research Chair and a Professor in the Simon Fraser University School of Interactive Arts and Technology. Her research works at the confluence of computer science, media art and design, and has focused on the cultural, visceral, and embodied implications of digital technologies, particularly in the realm of chronic pain.
- Carolyn Guertin is a Canadian artist, scholar, and author. Guertin is known for critical writing related to cyberfeminism, born-digital arts, participatory cultures, theoretical work in emergent media arts and literatures, global digital culture, information aesthetics, hacktivism, tactical media, and the social practices surrounding technology.
- N. Katherine Hayles (born 1943) is an American literary critic, most notable for her contribution to the fields of literature and science, electronic literature, and American literature. Her scholarship primarily focuses on the "relations between science, literature, and technology".
- Kathy Rae Huffman is an American curator, writer, producer, researcher, lecturer and expert for video and media art. Since the early 1980s, Huffman is said to have helped establish video and new media art, online and interactive art, installation and performance art in the visual arts world.
- David Jhave Johnston is a Canadian poet, videographer, and motion graphics artist working chiefly in digital and computational media,. and a researcher at the Center for Digital Narrative at the University of Bergen. This artist's work is often attributed, simply, to the name Jhave
- Lisbeth Klastrup (born in 1970) is a Danish scholar of digital and social media. Although her early research was on hypertext fiction, she is now best known for her research on transmedial worlds, social media, and death.
- George Landow (1940–2023) was Professor of English and Art History Emeritus at Brown University. He was a leading authority on Victorian literature, art, and culture, as well as a pioneer in criticism and theory of Electronic literature, hypertext and hypermedia. He also pioneered the use of hypertext and the web in higher education.
- Marjorie Luesebrink, (pseudonym M.D. Coverley, 1943–2023) was an American hypermedia fiction writer, scholar, and teacher. A pioneer born-digital writer, she is part of the first generation of electronic literature authors and a founding board member and past president of the Electronic Literature Organization.
- Lev Manovich is an artist, an author and a theorist of digital culture. Manovich played a key role in creating four new research fields: new media studies (1991–), software studies (2001–), cultural analytics (2007–) and AI aesthetics (2018–). Manovich's current research focuses on generative media, AI culture, digital art, and media theory.
- Cathy Marshall is a Principal Researcher in Microsoft Research's Silicon Valley Lab and an author of electronic literature. Marshall is mainly interested in studying human interaction when mediated by technology.
- Tim McLaughlin teaches, researches, and performs outreach in the use of 3D graphics for entertainment, design, education, training, and simulation. Tim's specific activities as a researcher include investigations into the uses of interactive and immersive 3D graphics for visual storytelling, collaborative tools for design, and animation systems.
- Talan Memmott is a digital writer/artist/theorist. Memmott has taught and been a researcher in digital art, digital design, electronic writing, new media studies, and digital culture.
- Adalaide Morris (1898–1983) was an American artist, scholar, and critic for modern poetry including information art, counter mapping, documentary, and digital works.
- Stuart Moulthrop (born 1957) is an innovator of electronic literature and hypertext fiction, both as a theoretician and as a writer. He was a founding board member of the Electronic Literature Organization in 1999.
- Janet Murray (born 1946) is an American academic and scholar well known as an early developer of humanities computing applications, a seminal theorist of digital media, and an advocate of new educational programs in digital media.
- Jessica Pressman is a scholar who studies electronic literature including digital poetry, media studies, and experimental literature. Her works examine how technologies affect reading practices that are displayed through several media forms.
- Rita Raley is an American researcher who focuses on digital literature. Her research interests include new media, electronic literature, digital humanities, contemporary arts (literature, media), activism and social practices, tactical media, global English, discourse on globalization, and language and information politics.
- Jill Walker Rettberg (born 1971) is co-director of the Center for Digital Narrative and Professor of Digital Culture at the University of Bergen. She is known for innovative research dissemination in social media and electronic literature.
- Scott Rettberg is an American digital artist and scholar of electronic literature based in Bergen, Norway. He is the co-founder and served as the first executive director of the Electronic Literature Organization.
- Marie-Laure Ryan is an independent literary scholar and critic. She has written several books and articles on narratology, fiction, and cyberculture and has been awarded several times for her work.
- Roberto Simanowski (born 1963) is a German scholar of literature and media studies and founder of dichtung-digital.
