= List of women electronic literature writers =

Women writers of electronic literature

This is a list of electronic literature authors and works (that originate from digital environments), and its critics. Electronic literature is a literary genre consisting of works of literature that originate within digital environments. This is a list of notable women writers of electronic literature.

Names not yet covered by Wikipedia articles should be adequately referenced. This is an ongoing Wikipedia Project.)

== A ==
- Annie Abrahams (born 1954), Dutch performance artist and writer, pioneering collective writing experiments
- Mabel Addis (1912–2004), American writer, teacher and game designer
- Laurie Anderson (1947), American artist, musician, electronic performance pioneer
- Anna Anthropy (fl 2010), American video game designer and interactive fiction author
- Kate Armstrong (fl 2000s), Canadian multimedia artist, experimental writer and curator

== B ==
- Pat Badani (fl. 2000s), Canadian-American digital artist and writer
- Adriana de Barros (born 1976), Portuguese-Canadian illustrator, creator of interactive narratives and poems
- Zoe Beloff (born 1958), American web serial creator
- Caroline Bergvall (born 1962), French-Norwegian poet experimenting with sound art performances
- Lillian-Yvonne Bertram (fl 2000s –2020s), American digital storyteller and poet
- Carroll Parrott Blue (1943–2019), African American filmmaker, creator of hypermedia works combining film and text
- Natalie Bookchin (fl 2000s), American new media artist
- Laura Borràs i Castanyer (born 1970), Catalan electronic literature editor and critic (as well as a politician)
- Amaranth Borsuk (born 1981), American poet experimenting with digital poetry
- Mez Breeze (fl 1990s), Australian artist practicing digital poetry and electronic literature
- Amy Briggs (born 1962), American video game developer involved in interactive fiction
- Jennifer Brozek (born 1970), American author and game design writer
- Nancy Buchanan (born 1946), American artist involved in digital performance art and fictional narrative
- Oni Buchanan (born 1975), American new media poet

== C ==
- J.R. Carpenter (born 1972), Canadian-British artist and writer active in digital literature
- Lynda Clark (born 1981), British author, creator of interactive fiction
- Kathryn Cramer (born 1962), science fiction writer, critic and hypertext editor
- Carolina Gainza (born 1978), Chilean researcher and sociologist, specializing in digital literature and culture

== D ==
- Caterina Davinio (born 1957), Italian poet, novelist and new media artist
- Sharon Daniel (fl 1990s – 2010s), American new media educator and writer
- Christy Dena (fl 2010), Australian writer, game designer and scholar
- Debra Di Blasi (born 1957), American hyperfiction educator and writer
- Claire Dinsmore (born 1961), American jeweller, designer and new media artist
- J. Yellowlees Douglas (born 1962), American writer, hypertext fiction scholar
- Kate Durbin (fl. 2009), American fiction and poetry writer

== E ==
- Adrienne Eisen (born 1966, a.k.a. Penelope Trunk), American writer, blogger and entrepreneur
- Lori Emerson (fl 2000s), new media preservationist and scholar
- Astrid Ensslin (fl 2000s), German digital humanities scholar active in digital fiction and video games
- Heid E. Erdrich (born 1963), Native American video poet
- Tina Escaja (born 1965), Spanish-American writer and digital artist

== F ==
- Natalia Fedorova (born 1981), Russian media artist, scholar, writer
- Caitlin Fisher, Canadian media artist and scholar
- Mary Flanagan (fl 2000s), American game designer
- Vera Frenkel (born 1938), Canadian multimedia artist

== G ==
- Belén Gache (born 1960), Spanish-Argentine novelist and experimental writer
- Dora García (born 1965), Spanish interactive and web performer
- Samantha Gorman (fl 2010), American game developer and digital storyteller
- Dene Grigar (fl 2000), American multimedia artist, former president of the Electronic Literature Organization
- Diane Gromala (born 1960), Canadian computer science and virtual reality designer
- Carolyn Guertin, Canadian educator, author, and critic

== H ==
- Amira Hanafi (born 1979), American/Egyptian artist and poet active in electronic literature
- Auriea Harvey (born 1971), artist, digital storyteller, and video game producer
- N. Katherine Hayles (born 1943), American literary critic and academic active in electronic literature
- Porpentine Charity Heartscape (born 1987), video game designer involving hypertext and interactive fiction
- Amy Hennig (born 1964), American video game developer and script writer
- Janet Holmes (fl 2000s), American poet and professor
- Kathy Rae Huffman (fl 1970s – 1990s), American writer and expert for video and media art

== J ==
- Shelley Jackson (born 1963), American experimental writer and artist
- Helen Varley Jamieson (born 1966), New Zealand digital media artist, cyperperformance creator
- Cynthia Lawson Jaramillo (fl 2000s),Guatemala digital artist, educator
- Natalie Jeremijenko (born 1966), new media artist and engineer

== K ==
- Yael Kanarek (born 1967), Israeli-American internet artist and writer
- Jayne Fenton Keane (fl 2000s), Australian multimedia poet
- Judith Kerman (fl 1970s-2020s), American oet creating generative works
- Lisbeth Klastrup (born 1970), Danish digital and social media scholar
- Alison Knowles (born 1933), American installation artist using visual, aural and tactile elements

== L ==
- Tina La Porta (born 1967), American digital artist and writer
- Deena Larsen (born 1964), American new media and hypertext author
- Brenda Laurel (born 1950), Video game developer
- Olia Lialina (born 1971), Russian internet artist and experimental film critic
- Christine Love (born 1989), Canadian novelist, interactive fiction writer and video game developer
- Marjorie Luesebrink (1943–2023), pen name M.D. Coverley, American author of hypertext fiction

== M ==
- Judy Malloy (born 1942), poet employing hypernarrative and information art
- Cathy Marshall (fl 1990s), collaborative hypertext researcher and developer
- Kathleen McConnell, pen name Kathy Mac (fl 2000s), Canadian poet
- María Mencía (fl 1999), Spanish-born media artist active in electronic literature
- Janet Murray (born 1946), electronic literature critic and designer

== N ==
- Ruth Nestvold (born 1958), American writer

== O ==
- Jaishree Odin (fl 1990s), American electronic literature scholar

== P ==
- Allison Parrish (fl 2000s), American poet, games designer and creator of poetry bots
- Celia Pearce (born 1961), American game designer
- Judith Pintar (fl 1980s), sociologist, harp player and author of interactive fiction
- Jessica Pressman (fl 2010), American academic and author involved in electronic literature, digital poetry and media
- Kate Pullinger (born 1961), Canadian novelist and academic, author of digital fiction

== Q ==
- Alissa Quart (born 1972), American writer, poet and multimedia author
- Zoë Quinn (born 1987), American video game developer, interactive fiction writer

== R ==
- Jean Rabe (fl 1970s), Canadian journalist, novelist and game writer
- Melinda Rackham (fl 1980s), Australian writer, digital artist and curator
- Rita Raley (fl 2000s), American researcher, editor, and critic
- Margaret Rhee (fl 2011), American new media artist with an interest in digital participatory action
- Francesca da Rimini (fl. 1990s), new media artist and cyberfeminist
- Raquel Salas Rivera (born 1985), Puerto Rican non-binary artist
- Marie-Laure Ryan (fl 2000s), electronic literature scholar

== S ==
- Alexandra Saemmer, French author of digital poetry, and critic
- Christy Sheffield Sanford, American web-specific writer and creator
- Emily Short (fl 2000s), American interactive fiction writer
- Lisa Smedman (fl 1997), Canadian writer of science fiction and gaming adventure novels
- Hazel Smith (born 1950s), Australian experimental and performance poet
- Sarah Smith (born 1947), American author and hypertext novelist
- Cheryl Sourkes (born 1945), Canadian new media artist
- Stephanie Strickland (born 1942), American poet, author of digital poems
- Kim Stringfellow (born 1963), American photography and multimedia artist
- Lisa Swanstrom (fl 2010), American researcher in literature, media theory and the digital humanities

== T ==
- Christine Tamblyn (1951–1998), American media artist, critic, and educator
- Sue Thomas (born 1951), British new media author
- Helen Thorington (1928–2023), American radio artist and composer
- Penelope Trunk (born 1966), American writer, hypertext novelist and entrepreneur

== U ==
- Ana María Uribe (1944–2004), Argentine poet working with visual poetry
- Camille Utterback (born 1970), American interactive installation artist

== W ==
- Rae White (fl 2010 – 2020s), Australian non-binary new media poet
- Christine Wilks (born 1960), British digital writer and artist
- Roberta Williams (born 1953), American video game designer and writer
- Josephine Wilson (fl. 2010s), Australian writer
- Adrianne Wortzel (born 1941), American artist using robotics in her works
- Nanette Wylde (fl. 1990s), American artist and writer active in net art and electronic literature

== Y ==
- Jin-me Yoon (born 1960), Canadian visual artist

== Z ==
- Jody Zellen (born 1961), American digital artist and art critic
- Marina Zurkow (born 1962), American visual and electronic artist

== See also ==
- List of electronic literature authors, critics, and works
