= Small Axe Project =

Academic journal and Caribbean cultural platforms

The Small Axe Project is an integrated publication undertaking devoted to Caribbean intellectual and artistic work, exercised over three platforms—Small Axe; sx salon, and sx visualities—each with a different structure, medium, and practice.

The Project also curates related events, symposia, and exhibitions. The Small Axe Project is administered by Small Axe Incorporated, a not-for-profit [501(c)3] organization established in New York State in 2002, and is funded by The Ford Foundation, The Reed Foundation, The Andy Warhol Foundation for the Visual Arts, The Wolf Kahn and Emily Mason Foundation, and the National Endowment for the Humanities. David Scott is the director of the Small Axe Project.

== David Scott ==
David Scott is the president of Small Axe Inc., the director of the Small Axe Project, and the founding editor of Small Axe journal. He teaches in the Department of Anthropology at Columbia University. He is the author of Formations of Ritual: Colonial and Anthropological Discourses on the Sinhala Yaktovil (1994), Refashioning Futures: Criticism After Postcoloniality (1999), Conscripts of Modernity: The Tragedy of Colonial Enlightenment (2004), Omens of Adversity: Tragedy, Time, Memory, Justice (2014), and Stuart Hall's Voice: Intimations of an Ethics of Receptive Generosity (2017). He is also co-editor of Powers of the Secular Modern: Talal Asad and his Interlocutors (2007), He is currently working on a book project examining the moral imperative of reparations for New World slavery.

David Scott was awarded the Council of Editors of Learned Journals (CELJ) Distinguished Editor prize in 2017 for his work as editor of Small Axe: A Caribbean Journal of Criticism. Gordon Hutner said, at the Book Review Session arranged by CELJ on 5 January 2017:

With Small Axe, Scott has moved to generate (and increasingly widen) a collective conversation about modernity and the Caribbean's central place in shaping (and being shaped by) it...Scott describes editing as "the cultivation of a capacity for attunement to the work of others, and a responsive ability to shelter and enable perspectives on common and uncommon themes that do not necessarily align with, and indeed, that sometimes wilfully diverge from, one's own." He is also loyal not only to his contributors but to his journal's audiences—who rely on him to sift and assess and encourage excellence. Overall, this journal brings to life an active intellectual and artistic community. Scott's vision for that community is clear and alive and open-ended: to be aware of the history of what it has meant to think and study the Caribbean and to keep asking, as he says in another excellent introduction to an issue, "What today is Caribbean studies? What can it be?"

Among others praising Scott's work, Roshini Kempadoo, lecturer at the University of Westminster, said: "Small Axe edited and published under Scott's vision has become one of most relevant intellectual and creative publications for our current political, social and cultural climate. Small Axe continues to reflect the 'problem space' of the contemporary global moment."

== Small Axe: A Caribbean Journal of Criticism ==
Small Axe
- Discipline: Criticism
- Language: English, Spanish, French
- Edited by: David Scott

Publication details
- History: 1997–present
- Publisher: Duke University Press for Small Axe Incorporated
- Frequency: Triannually

Standard abbreviations
- ISO 4: Small Axe

Indexing
- ISSN: 0799-0537 (print); 1534-6714 (web)
- LCCN: 99100400
- OCLC no.: 46614817

Links
- Journal homepage; Online access; Online archive; Journal page at publisher's website

Small Axe: A Caribbean Journal of Criticism is a peer-reviewed triannual print journal that was established in Jamaica in March 1997 as a forum for critical writing. It was originally published by Ian Randle Publishers biannually for the Small Axe Collective. In 1998, the journal moved to University of the West Indies Press. The journal moved again in 2000 to Indiana University Press, and began triannual publication in 2006. Small Axe has been published by Duke University Press in March, July and November, since 2009. David Scott is Editor and Vanessa Pérez-Rosario is Managing Editor.

The journal publishes scholarly articles, essays, book discussions, and interviews, as well as literary works of fiction and poetry, visual arts, and reviews. The mission of the journal consists in the renewal of practices of intellectual criticism in the Caribbean, as well as an interrogation and expansion of the idea of "criticism". Furthermore, Small Axe aims to rethink extant conceptualizations of the regional and diasporic Caribbean, and to provide a platform for critical dialogues emerging from and pertaining to the Caribbean.

According to The Caribbean Review of Books, Small Axe has become "the leading intellectual journal published in the anglophone Caribbean, while maintaining a decidedly critical stance towards the region's political and cultural establishment."

Small Axe celebrated its 50th issue in 2016.

== sx salon: a small axe literary platform ==
sx salon is a twi-annual digital forum for critical and creative explorations of Caribbean literature. Since its initiation in 2010, sx salon has aimed to stimulate and engage aesthetic forms across different literary genres that reflect the changing sensibilities of regional diasporic realities. sx salon publishes literature discussions, interviews, reviews, poetry and prose. Issues appear in February, June and October. Rachel Mordecai, Editor; Ronald Cummings, Book Review Editor; Danielle Legros Georges, Creative Editor.

=== sx live ===
sx live is a blog that features notable and upcoming events in the field of Caribbean studies, as well as brief interviews and reviews by or concerning people associated with the Small Axe Project.

Past projects

sx archipelagos: a small axe platform for digital practice

A digital platform launched in 2016 that focuses on the digital humanities and its implications for Caribbean scholarship. In the wake of the "digital turn" in the humanities, sx archipelagos seeks to promote creative exploration, debate, and critical thinking about and through digital practices in contemporary scholarly and artistic work in and on the Caribbean. Sx archipelagos engages with scholarly essays; digital scholarship projects; and digital project reviews. Alex Gil and Kaiama L. Glover, editors. Since March 2020 sx archipelagos continues independently as archipelagos.

=== Literary competition ===
The literary competition, launched in 2009, serves as a venue for hearing the voices of emerging Caribbean writers of short fiction and poetry, writing in English, Spanish and French. The competition offers prizes for first and second places in each category. Competition winners are published in Small Axe the following year. Martin Munro and Vanessa Pérez-Rosario, Coordinators.

In 2017, the Small Axe Literary Competition entered a new phase, accepting entries in Spanish, English, and French, on a three-year rotation for submissions in these language.

=== The Caribbean Digital ===
Since 2014, the Caribbean Digital has hosted conferences and symposia related to the practice and history of the digital in relation to changing social and geo-political contours in the Caribbean and its diasporas. The conference is convened and organized by Kaiama Glover, Alex Gil, and Kelly Baker Josephs.

The Visual Life of Social Affliction

An internationally travelling exhibition project commissioning ten Caribbean artists paired with ten Caribbean writers to create artworks and texts respectively. The Visual Life of Social Affliction explored the persistent suffering resulting from violent racist and genocidal legacies of colonialism. The artists included: Blue Curry, Florine Demosthene, Ricardo Edwards, Patricia Kaersenhout, Miguel Luciano, Anna Jane McIntyre, René Peña, Marcel Pinas, Belkis Ramírez, and Kara Springer who were paired with writers: Chandra Frank, Christian Campbell, Yolanda Wood, Anna Kesson, Kaneesha Parsard, Christina León, Erica Moiah James, Nicole Smythe-Johnson, Marielle Barrow and Claire Tancons. The artist-writer collaborations were published, presented in a catalogue for the exposition. The exhibition was presented in multiple locations between 2018 and 2020.

== Abstracting and indexing ==
The journal is abstracted and indexed in EBSCO Academic Search Premier, EBSCO Current Abstracts, EBSCO Current Citations Express, EBSCO Humanities International Complete, EBSCO Humanities International Index, Hispanic American Periodical Index, Humanities Abstracts, Humanities Index, MLA Bibliography, ProQuest Discovery, ProQuest International Index to Black Periodicals, ProQuest Literature Online (LION), ProQuest News and Magazines, ProQuest Periodicals, ProQuest Prisma, ProQuest Research Library and Wilson Omnifile.
