= List of electronic literature authors, critics, and works =

This is a list of electronic literature resources.. Electronic literature is a literary genre consisting of works of literature that originate within digital environments. It can also be defined as those works using a digital element as an integral part of the work (essential to convey the meaning of the piece). This list is specific and exclusive to literature and works originally published electronically, and does not include works published in book format only, web blogs, newspapers, directories, etc. However, this list may include works that have been published both electronically and in print.

== Writers and Critics ==
- List of electronic literature authors (precursors, creative authors, scholars, and critics)
- List of women electronic literature writers

== Works and resources ==
See Category:Electronic literature works for more works

- Electronic literature titles
- Publishers, journals, and collections
- Educational resources for electronic literature

== Landmark Reviews ==
- Robert Coover, 1993 New York Times Book Review, "Hyperfiction: Novels for the Computer"
- Robert Coover, August 29, 1993 New York Times Book Review, "Hyperfiction; And Now, Boot Up the Reviews"

== Awards ==
There are various awards for electronic literature including:

- Electronic Literature Awards from the Electronic Literature Organization, awarded annually for the best literary work and the best work of scholarship
- New Media Writing Prize, an annual international competition from the UK with prizes for innovative digital fiction
- Woollahra Digital Literary Award, an annual award in support of Australian digital literature and publishing

== Organizations ==
- Electronic Literature Organization
- Red de Literatura Electrónica Latinoamericana – Lit(e)Lat

Educational resources for electronic literature have been developed for many literature courses.

Electronic literature is a literary genre defined as “born digital” works that use computational media to create artistic literary effects with an expanded repertoire that goes well beyond words.

See the overall links to electronic literature authors, critics, resources, and works.

== Syllabi from courses ==
Digital Storytelling at Washington State University at Vancouver in Spring 2023 with Dene Grigar taught At Nightfall. A Goldfish, Ghost, First Draft of the Revolution (Emily Short), Figurski at Findhorn on Acid (Richard Holeton), Hours of the Night (Stephanie Strickland).

Critical Making of Contemporary Information through Digital-born Creative Works with Shanmugapriya T at University of Toronto in Winter 2022

Applachian State University with Leonardo Flores:

- Underrepresented Voices in Digital Literature ENG 2369 included Uncle Roger (Judy Malloy), My Body a Wunderkammer (Shelley Jackson), The Hunt for the Gay Planet (Anna Anthropy), Quing's Quest VII: The Death of Videogames!” (Dietrich Squinkifer-Squinky), With Those We Love Alive (Porpentine), Galatea (Emily Short), Twisty Little Passages (Nick Monfort), “c-ya-laterrrr” (Dan Hett), and “Please Answer Carefully” (litrouke).
- The Materials of Poetry English 3704 included hyperpoems (William Dickey), Seattle Drift (Jim Andrews), Ask Me for the Moon (John David Zuern), The Sweet Old Etcetera (Alison Clifford), Fitting the Pattern (Christine Wilks),“Between Page to Screen” (Amaranth Borsuk), Requiem (Caitlin Fisher), The Water Cave (Andy Campbell, Magpie (Andy Campbell and Judi Alston), and Monde 4 “Alice” (Marc Veyrat)
- Electronic Literature and Digital Writing Eng 5535 Summer 2022 included Uncle Roger (Judy Malloy), Underground Kingdom (Edward Packard), Living Will (Mark Marino), Birds Singing Other Birds’ Songs (María Mencía), My Boyfriend Came Back From the War (Olia Lialina)
- Postmodern Experimental Poetry English 4795/6 Spring 2021 included Cent Mille Milliards de Poèmes (Raymond Queneau), Eunoia (Christian Bök), The Black Book (Jean Keller), and The Deletionist (Amaranth Borsuk)

Natalie Federova's Text in Art courses included Michael Joyce (afternoon, a story), Patchwork Girl (Shelley Jackson), Shade (Andrew Plotkin), The Facade (Michael Mateas and Andrew Stern), The Intruder (Natalie Bookchin), ROMAN (Roman Leibov), and I cannot remember time I didn't need you (Danielle Brathwaite-Shirley).

Al-gazali Bohari has a questionnaire on At Nightfall, the Goldfish, a hypertext that won the 2024 New Media Writing Prize.

Christopher Funkhouser's 2008 Digital Poetry syllabus

Open source poetry curriculum for AI
