= Cheryl E. Ball =

American educator and scholar (born 1973)

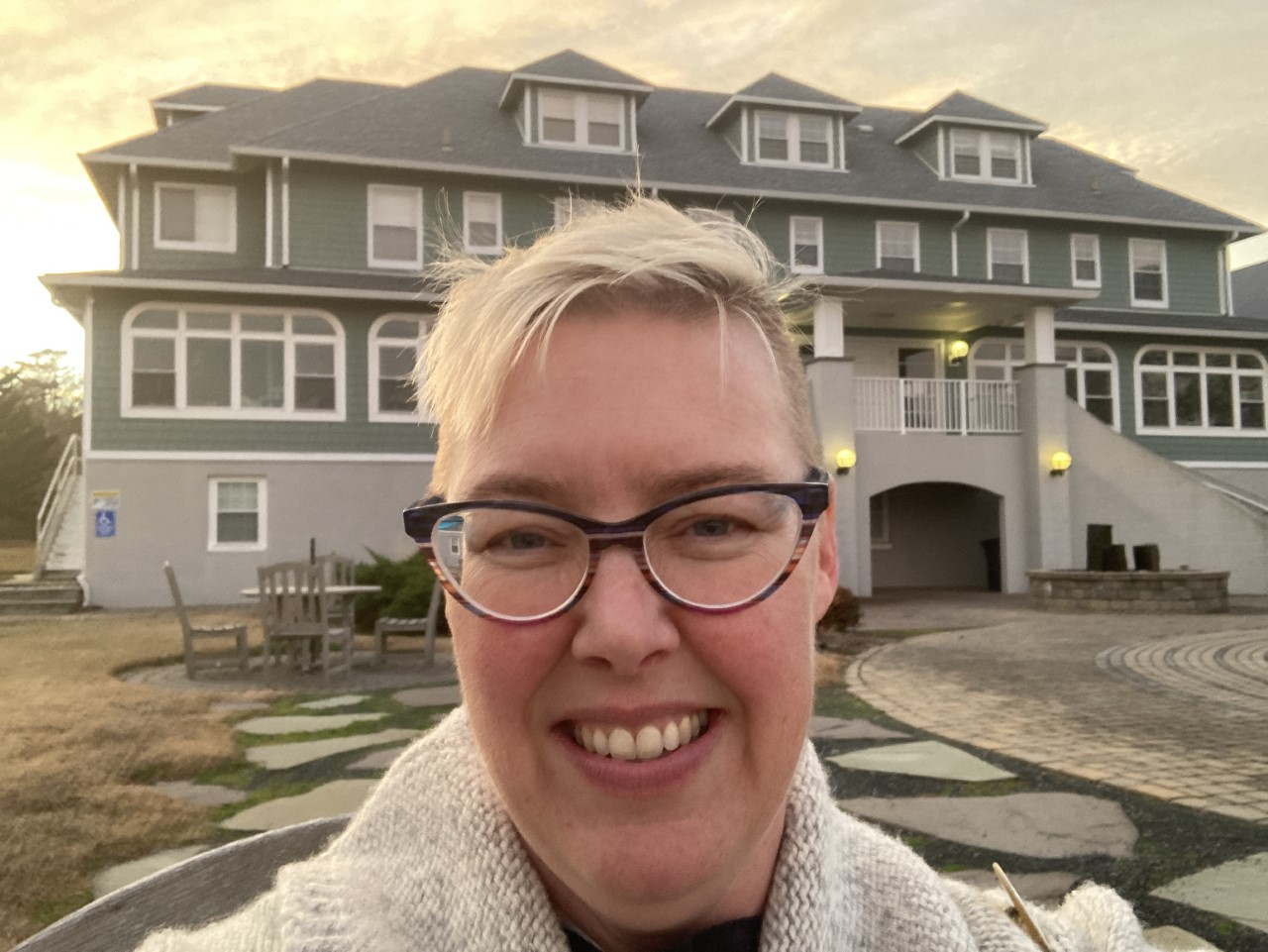
- Cheryl E. Ball
- Born: 1973 (age 52–53)

Academic background
- Education: Michigan Technological University; Virginia Commonwealth University; Old Dominion University
- Doctoral advisor: Anne F. Wysocki

Academic work
- Discipline: Composition studies; Rhetoric; Publishing
- Institutions: [Independent Scholar]

Cheryl E. Ball (born 1973) is an independent academic and scholar in rhetoric, composition, and publishing studies, and executive director for the Council of Editors of Learned Journals (CELJ). Ball also serves as senior co-editor of Kairos: A Journal of Rhetoric, Technology, and Pedagogy, an open access, online journal dedicated to multimodal academic publishing, which she has edited since 2006. Ball's awards include Best Article on Pedagogy or Curriculum in Technical or Science Communication from the Conference on College Composition and Communication (CCCC), the Computers and Composition Charles Moran Award for Distinguished Service to the Field, and the Technology Innovator Award presented by the CCCC Committee on Computers in Composition and Communication (7Cs). Her book, The New Work of Composing (co-edited with Debra Journet and Ryan Trauman) was the winner of the 2012 Computers and Composition Distinguished Book Award. Her contributions to academic research span the areas of digital publishing, new media scholarship, and multimodal writing pedagogy.

== Biography ==
=== Education ===
Cheryl Ball earned a B.A. from Old Dominion University in 1996, an M.F.A. in Poetry from Virginia Commonwealth University in 2000, and a Ph.D. in Rhetoric and Technical Communication, from Michigan Technological University in 2005.

=== Teaching and professional experience ===
Ball is currently an independent scholar and digital publishing consultant. Prior to this, she was Director of the Digital Publishing Collaborative at Wayne State University Libraries and Editor-in-Chief for the Library Publishing Curriculum. She was also an associate professor of Digital Publishing at West Virginia University, and in 2013–14, was a visiting Fulbright Scholar at the Oslo School of Architecture and Design, in Oslo, Norway. From 2007 to 2014, Ball was an assistant and associate professor of New Media Studies at Illinois State University. Her first academic position was as an assistant professor of Computers & Writing at Utah State University (2004–07).

=== Pronouns ===
Ball uses the term pronoun flexible to refer to their gender identity while also referring to themselves as a "queer, cis, white woman". They define this phrase on their website as "she/he/they/ze — whatever you see, you may call me. As long as it’s with respect!"

== Professional contributions ==
=== Research and development ===
Ball's research has focused on the areas of teaching and learning in multimodal composition, digital and open access publishing, new media studies, and alternative assessment models for multimodal writing. Her research on the teaching, reading, and assessment of multimodal or new media composition forwards a rhetorical approach for analyzing and producing multimodal texts.

In the area of digital publishing, Ball is the recipient, with Andrew Morrison, of over one million in grant funding from the Andrew W. Mellon Foundation for the development of open access digital publishing platform, Vega as well as an NEH Digital Humanities Start-Up Grant. Ball's developmental work on Vega emerges from her recognition of the need for more robust digital platforms for the editing and publishing of multimedia research. She describes Vega as "an editorial management system that will move a piece of scholarly multimedia through the submission, review, and production processes as a single, scholarly entity." Although the Vega platform work concluded in 2022, Ball continues to develop ways for digital scholarly publishing to be more open, inclusive, and accessible through her research and work with Kairos, CELJ, and professional consulting.

=== Editorial work ===
As an editor, Ball has extensive experience in open access, digital, and academic publishing, especially in the areas of new media or multimedia scholarly publishing. Much of this work has been focused on the open-access multimedia publication Kairos: A Journal of Rhetoric, Technology, and Pedagogy, which she has taken an active editorial role in since 2001. While her official title has changed over the years (from CoverWeb editor, to editor, to senior co-editor), Ball's work for the journal has substantially shaped its mission as "the longest-running, and most stable, online journal" in the field of rhetoric and composition. Ball was also instrumental in clarifying how articles or "webtexts" published in Kairos provide an opportunity for scholars to explore how multimodal, digital design elements can "enact authors' scholarly arguments, so that the form and content of the work are inseparable." Beyond her work with Kairos, Ball has also served as both an assistant and associate editor of Computers and Composition: An International Journal from 2001 to 2004, and was the founding editor of the #writing book series editor at WAC Clearinghouse.

=== Non-academic work ===
Ball has recently developed work outside of the academic realm to include intuition, tarot, carpentry, and digital nomadism. She writes about the intersections of these professional passions in non-fiction essays and two in-progress memoirs.

== Selected works ==
=== Books ===
- Eyman, D, & Ball, C.E. (2023–ongoing). Publishing digital scholarship: A how-to guide and oral history [of the longest, continuously running open-access scholarly multimedia journal]. https://kairosbook.online
- Ball, C. E., & Loewe, D. M. (2017). Bad ideas about writing. West Virginia University Libraries; Digital Publishing Institute. https://www.oercommons.org/courses/bad-ideas-about-writing
- Journet, D., Ball, C., & Trauman, R. (Eds.). (2012). The New Work of Composing. Logan, UT: Computers and Composition Digital Press/Utah State University Press. http://ccdigitalpress.org/nwc
- Ball, Cheryl, & James Kalmbach (eds.). (2010). RAW: (Reading and Writing) New Media. Hampton Press.

=== Textbooks ===
- Ball, C. E., Sheppard, J., & Arola, K. L. (2022). Writer/designer: A guide to making multimodal projects (3rd ed.). Bedford/St. Martin's.
- Ball, C. E., Arola, K. L., & Bedford/St. Martin's. (2006). IX visual exercises for tech comm (CD). Boston: Bedford/St. Martins.

=== Articles ===
- Guimont, C., Ball, C.E., & Vaughn, M. (2024). Finding the right platform: A report on building a publishing platform crosswalk. International Journal of Librarianship, 8(4). [Special issue: Scholarly communications]. https://doi.org/10.23974/ijol.2024.vol8.4.342
- Ball, Cheryl E. (2017). Building a scholarly multimedia publishing infrastructure. Journal of Scholarly Publishing, 48(2), 99–115
- Eyman, D., & Ball, C. (2015). Digital humanities scholarship and electronic publication. Rhetoric and the digital humanities, 65.
- Eyman, D., & Ball, C. E. (2014). Composing for digital publication: Rhetoric, design, code. Composition studies, 42(1), 114–117.
- Ball, C. E., Bowen, T. S., & Fenn, T. B. (2013). Genre and transfer in a multimodal composition class. Multimodal literacies and emerging genres, 15–36.
- Ball, C. E. (2012). Assessing scholarly multimedia: A rhetorical genre studies approach. Technical Communication Quarterly, 21(1), 61–77.
- Anderson, D., Atkins, A., Ball, C., Millar, K. H., Selfe, C., & Selfe, R. (2006). Integrating multimodality into composition curricula: Survey methodology and results from a CCCC research grant. Composition Studies, 34(2), 59–84.
- Ball, C. E. (2006). Designerly≠ readerly: Re-assessing multimodal and new media rubrics for use in writing studies. Convergence, 12(4), 393–412.
- Ball, C. E. (2004). Show, not tell: The value of new media scholarship. Computers and Composition, 21(4), 403–425.

== National awards ==
- Charles Moran Award for Distinguished Service to the Field. (2018). Presented by Computers &Composition: An International Journal at the 2018 Computers & Writing Conference.
- Computers and Composition Distinguished Book Award. (2013). For The New Work of Composing (ed. Journet, Ball, & Trauman).
- CCCC Technical and Scientific Communication Award for Best Article on Pedagogy or Curriculum in Technical or Scientific Communication. (2013). For “Assessing Scholarly Multimedia: A Rhetorical Genre Studies Approach.” [See publications entry].
- Technology Innovator Award. (2012). Presented by the Conference on College Composition andCommunication Committee on Computers in Composition and Communication (7Cs).

== See also ==
- Multimodality
- Digital publishing
- Computers and writing
- Conference on College Composition and Communication
- Composition Studies
