= David Scott (anthropologist) =

Jamaican academic and curator (born 1958)

- Born: 1958 (age 67–68); Jamaica
- Occupations: Academic, author and curator
- Known for: Founder and editor of Small Axe: A Caribbean Journal of Criticism
- Awards: Guggenheim Fellowship (2023)

Academic background
- Education: University of the West Indies at Mona (BA) The New School for Social Research (PhD)

Academic work
- Discipline: Anthropology
- Institutions: Columbia University

David Scott (born 1958) is a Jamaican academic and curator. He is the Ruth and William Lubic Professor of Anthropology and chair of the anthropology department at Columbia University in New York City, United States. He is a recipient of a 2023 Guggenheim Fellowship.

Scott is the founder and editor of Small Axe: A Caribbean Journal of Criticism and director of the Small Axe Project, which is devoted to Caribbean intellectual and artistic work.

Scott is the author of several books, with recent titles including Stuart Hall’s Voice: Intimations of an Ethics of Receptive Generosity (2017), The Paradox of Freedom: A Biographical Dialogue (with Orlando Patterson, 2023) and Irreparable Evil: An Essay in Moral and Reparatory History (2024).

== Biography ==
Scott was born in Jamaica in 1958. He received his bachelor's degree from the University of the West Indies at Mona in 1980 and PhD from the New School for Social Research in 1989. His research has focused on postcolonial politics, diaspora, and cultural history in the Caribbean and Sri Lanka.

Scott was the curatorial director of the 2022 Kingston Biennial. He is also the director of the Small Axe Project, which is devoted to Caribbean intellectual and artistic work.

In 2025, Scott delivered the annual Walter Rodney lecture at the University of Warwick'’s Yesu Persaud Centre for Caribbean Studies.

=== Writing ===
Scott is the author of books that include Formations of Ritual: Colonial and Anthropological Discourses on the Sinhala Yaktovil (1994), Refashioning Futures: Criticism After Postcoloniality (1999), Conscripts of Modernity: The Tragedy of Colonial Enlightenment (2004), Omens of Adversity: Tragedy, Time, Memory, Justice (2014), Stuart Hall's Voice: Intimations of an Ethics of Receptive Generosity (2017), and Irreparable Evil: An Essay in Moral and Reparatory History (2024).

Scott co-edited, with Charles Hirschkind, Powers of the Secular Modern: Talal Asad and His Interlocutors (2006).

== Publications ==
- Formations of Ritual: Colonial and Anthropological Discourses on the Sinhala Yaktovil (University of Minnesota Press, 1994)
- Refashioning Futures: Criticism After Postcoloniality (Princeton University Press, 1999)
- Conscripts of Modernity: The Tragedy of Colonial Enlightenment (Duke University Press, 2004)
- Omens of Adversity: Tragedy, Time, Memory, Justice (Duke University Press, 2014)
- Stuart Hall's Voice: Intimations of an Ethics of Receptive Generosity (Duke University Press, 2017)
- The Paradox of Freedom: A Biographical Dialogue, with Orlando Patterson (Polity, 2023)
- Irreparable Evil: An Essay in Moral and Reparatory History (Columbia University Press, 2024)

=== As editor ===
- With Charles Hirschkind, Powers of the Secular Modern: Talal Asad and His Interlocutors (Stanford University Press, 2006, ISBN 9780804752657)
