= Danielle Brathwaite-Shirley =

English artist, archivist (born 1995)

Danielle Brathwaite–Shirley (born 1995) is an English multimedia artist and archivist whose work employs interactive video game design, animation, video, sound, painting, and live performance, to focus on the archiving of Black trans lives, stories, and experiences. Brathwaite-Shirley is primarily known for interactive video games that navigate questions of race, gender, and colonialism, asking players to consider their role in the welfare of Black trans individuals.

== Early life and education ==
Brathwaite-Shirley was born in London in 1995. She graduated with a Bachelor of Arts from the Slade School of Fine Art, London in 2019.

== Influences ==
Brathwaite-Shirley's work draws from a wide range of influences. Brathwaite-Shirley has cited Nintendo 64 and PlayStation 1 and 2 video games such as Silent Hill and Disaster Report, the horror novel House of Leaves by Mark Z. Danielewski, and the artworks of Francis Bacon and Caravaggio as sources of inspiration for her work. Brathwaite-Shirley has also shared the impact of playing Dragon's Dogma in the early days of her gender transition. Additionally, she often creates work in collaboration with other Black and trans individuals, such as Black Trans Archive (2020), and these stories shape the player's choices and their experience of interaction with the game.

== Works and exhibitions ==
- BLACKTRANSARCHIVE.COM (Ongoing)
- SHE KEEPS ME DAMN ALIVE (2021) – Arebyte Gallery, London
- GET HOME SAFE (2022) – David Kordansky Gallery, Los Angeles
- THE REBIRTHING ROOM (2024) – Studio Voltaire, London
- THE DELUSION (2025) – Serpentine Galleries, London

== Personal life ==
Brathwaite-Shirley is transgender. She lives and works in both Berlin and London.
