= Lorgia García Peña =

Latinx studies scholar

- Born: August 17, 1978 (age 48); Dominican Republic
- Education: Rutgers University; University of Michigan
- Occupations: Scholar, Activist, Professor
- Years active: 2010-Present
- Notable work: The Borders of Dominicanidad, Community as Rebellion, Translating Blackness
- Website: lorgiagarciapena.com

Lorgia García Peña is an ethnic studies scholar, activist, and professor at the Effron Center for the Study of America and the department of African American studies at Princeton University. She formerly served as Mellon professor of studies in race, colonialism, and diaspora at Tufts University from 2021 to 2023. She became a subject of national attention after being denied tenure at Harvard University, where she taught from 2013 to 2021. She is the author of The Borders of Dominicanidad: Race, Nation and Archives of Contradiction and Translating Blackness: Latinx Colonialities in Global Perspective.

Her expertise lies in Latino studies, global blackness, colonialism, migration, and diaspora studies, focusing on dominicanidades. In addition, her work is grounded on social justice, women of color feminisms, and Afro-Latino episteme. Central to García Peña’s work is her strong commitment to undocumented communities and first-generation students of color.

She is the co-founder and a board member of Freedom University Georgia and an advisory board member for the Public Humanities Initiative. García Peña has received various awards, including the Latin American Studies Association’s Frank Bonilla Public Intellectual Award.

== Early life and education ==
García Peña grew up in the Dominican Republic until she was 12 years old, when she immigrated to the United States, joining her parents who had departed earlier for Trenton, New Jersey. She finished high school at the age of 14 and, as her parents felt she was too young to go away to college, enrolled at Rutgers University. She subsequently earned a master's degree in Spanish and Latin American literatures and cultures from Rutgers and a master's and Ph.D. in American cultures from the University of Michigan.

== Career ==
García Peña began teaching at the University of Georgia in 2010 as Assistant Professor of Latino/a Studies in the Romance Languages and Literatures Department. While teaching at the University of Georgia, Dr. García Peña co-founded Freedom University Georgia in 2011. This came as a response to Georgia’s Board of Regents’ decision to ban undocumented students from enrolling at the top five public universities in Georgia, and prohibiting them from qualifying for in-state tuition. Operating from Athens, Georgia, Freedom University provides tuition-free college instruction and various support networks for undocumented students. Dr. García Peña now serves as a board member for the university.

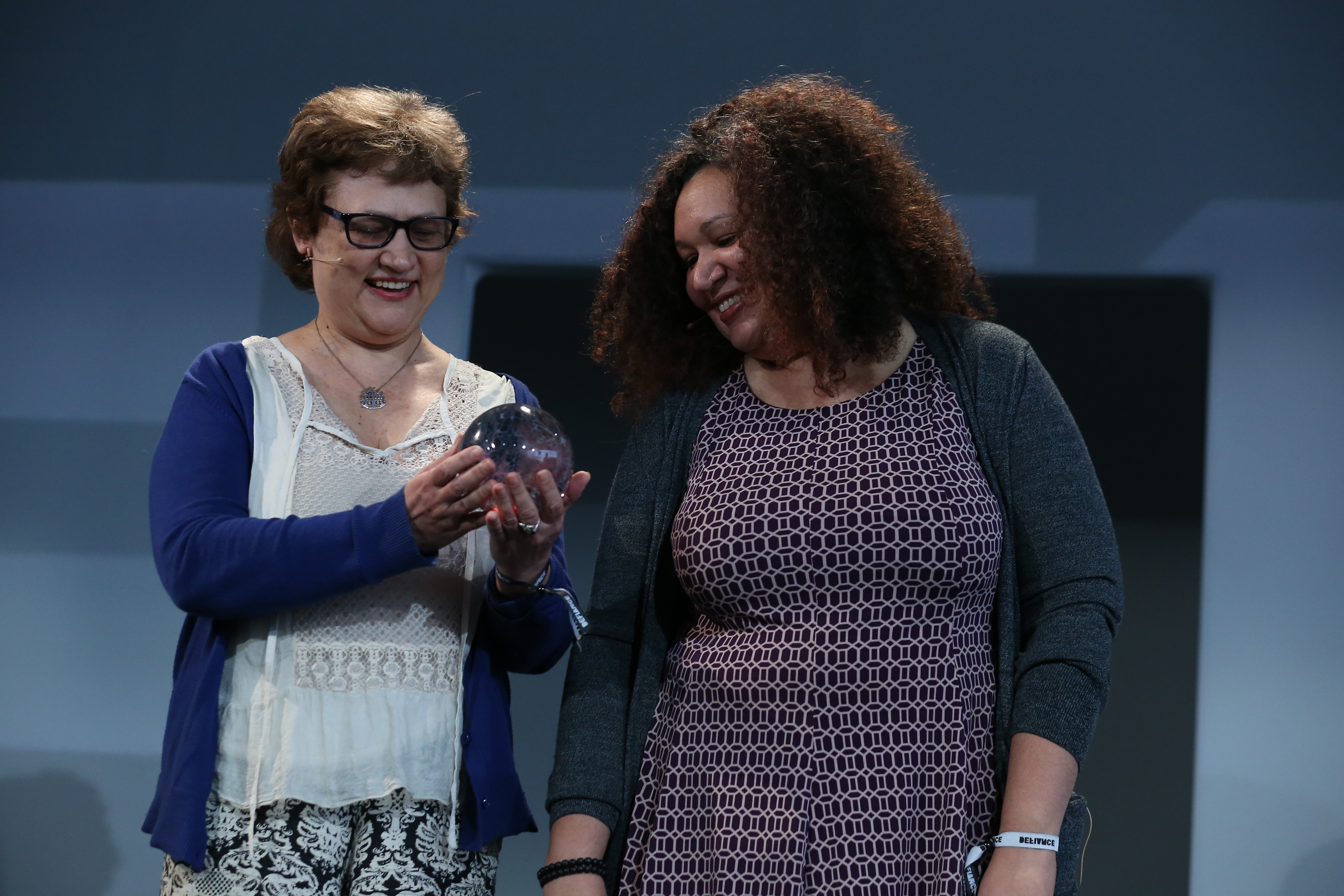
Betina Kaplan and Lorgia García Peña at the MIT Media Lab Defiance event in 2017

In 2017 she and Betina Kaplan presented their work at the MIT Defiance Event, and earned an honorable mention award.

She then taught at Harvard University from 2013 to 2021, jointly appointed in the Romance Languages and Literature department and the History and Literature program. She served as assistant professor, then Roy G. Clause Associate Professor. She was denied tenure in November 2019, and though different groups repeatedly urged the university to revisit the decision, the university did not. The case is pending before the Massachusetts Commission Against Discrimination, as García Peña alleges it was part of a pattern of discrimination she encountered across her time at Harvard.

She was appointed to a tenured position at Tufts University in the Department of Studies in Race, Colonialism, and Diaspora and began teaching in fall 2021. The position was supported by a $1.5 million grant from the Andrew W. Mellon Foundation.

García Peña was selected by the Marguerite Casey Foundation as one of six 2021 Freedom Scholars, honoring "emerging leaders in academia whose research can provide critical insight to social justice leaders and whose ideas encourage all of us to imagine how we can radically improve our democracy, economy and society." The award grants recipients $250,000 in recognition of their work in "cultivating and nurturing movements for justice and freedom."

She joined the Department of African American Studies at Princeton University on July 1, 2023.

== Works ==
García Peña is author of The Borders of Dominicanidad: Race, Nation and Archives of Contradiction, published by Duke University Press in 2016. The book won 2017 National Women's Studies Association Gloria E. Anzaldúa Book Prize, the 2016 LASA Latino/a Studies Book Award, and the 2016 Isis Duarte Book Prize in Haiti and Dominican Studies. Reviewing The Borders of Dominicanidad for The Latin Americanist, Sobeira Latorre said the book “offers a historically grounded, meticulously researched, and thoughtful analysis of how dominant narratives of Dominican racial and national identity developed, and the ways in which these narratives have historically excluded racialized people.” The Spanish translation received national attention in the Dominican Republic and the Spanish speaking diaspora.

García Peña has also published Community as Rebellion: A Syllabus for Surviving Academia as a Woman of Color (Haymarket Books 2022) and Translating Blackness: Latinx Colonialities in Global Perspective (Duke University Press, 2022).

García Peña has also written on social and political issues in The New York Times, Harpers Bazaar, The Boston Review, NACLA, Asterix, Aperture Magazine, among other outlets.
