= Lynn Cherny =

Data science consultant

- Born: 1967 (age 58–59)
- Education: Stanford University, Cambridge University, University of Maryland
- Occupation: Data analysis consultant
- Website: www.ghostweather.com

Lynn Cherny (born 1967) is a Boston-based data analysis consultant specialized in data mining and analysis, customer research, and interface design. She is currently a faculty member at EMLYON Business School. She has worked as a consultant for companies including TiVo, Adobe, AT&T Labs, Autodesk, and Internet startups, doing work such as statistical programming in R and Python, text clustering, data analysis on survey data and software usage logs, design for bioinformatics tools, dashboard mockups, and soup-to-nuts interaction design.

== Education ==
Cherny received a Ph.D. from Stanford University in Linguistics; an M.Phil. from Cambridge University in Computer Speech and Language Processing; and a B.A. from University of Maryland in Linguistics.

== Career ==
Cherny showcased her interest in data analysis and design while she was a Ph.D. student at Stanford. Her career began in research in an HCI group at Bell Labs (later AT&T Labs), but she left research to work in industry as a UI designer. She also serves as a self-employed consultant for data analysis and data visualization at Ghostweather Research & Design, LLC. In recent years, she received an academic fellowship teaching Interactive Data Visualization from University of Miami, and currently serves as associate professor in Emlyon Business School at Lyon, France. She is also the author of two books "Wired Women: Gender and New Realities in Cyberspace," and "Conversation and Community: Chat in a Virtual World."

=== Data-driven design ===
Cherny spent 20 years in various UX, UI, and usability roles in Silicon Valley, Paris, Seattle, and Boston. Starting from 1998, she served as one of the first UI designer at Excite, Inc in 2000, she was hired as a Senior UI Designer and became manager of the UI and Usability group at TiVo, Inc. Leaving for a job opportunity offered by Axance, a web usability consulting company in Paris, France in 2001, Cherny was responsible for international projects and project oversight, as well as extending business into design consulting. From 2002 to 2004, she served as senior Interaction Designer for Adobe Systems, Inc, where she designed for interoperability and UI consistency in the Creative Suite 2 bundle, which consisted of Photoshop, Illustrator, InDesign, Acrobat. She shared a patent for some of her work on color management synchronization, settings and PDF export. Cherny worked for the MathWorks from 2004–2005, where she focused on bioinformatics, biological simulation and developing data analysis/visualization tools. She shared a patent for a data visualization tool designed and developed at the MathWorks. From 2005 to 2007, she serves as the manager of interaction design and visual design team at Autodesk, working on an architectural design desktop application and responsible for user research and design management. From 2007 to 2010, she worked as a user experience research and design Consultant for SolidWorks.

=== Data Consulting ===
Serving as a self-employed consultant for data analysis and data visualization at Ghostweather Research & Design, LLC, Cherny has worked on data visualization and analysis problems including creating customer personas from survey data and interviews, visualizing tax brackets, analyzing bug reports and stack traces, clustering pharmaceutical drug reports, network analysis for topic modeling, entity recognition of company names in news articles, and dashboard design.

=== Teaching ===
Cherny is currently an associate professor at Emlyon Business School, where she teaches business analytics, Python, text mining, SQL, visualization. From 2015 to 2016, she served as visiting Knight Chair for the Center for Communication, Culture and Change at University of Miami. She taught data visualization and data analysis and help launching Data Visualization and Journalism track in the School of Communication's Interactive Media department.

== Publications ==
Cherny published a book titled Wired Women: Gender and New Realities in Cyberspace, which looks at women and the new Internet technology and culture features fourteen essays that discuss such issues as gender attitudes, courtship via e-mail, censorship, hacker culture, online harassment.

Cherny's dissertation from Stanford University was an early study on online user-extensible chat community, later published as Conversation and Community: Chat in a Virtual World (CSLI, 1999). She revised this dissertation into a book of the same title Conversation and Community: Chat in a Virtual World.
