= Kathleen McConnell =

Canadian academic and writer

Kathleen McConnell is a Canadian academic and writer. A professor of English literature at St. Thomas University in Fredericton, New Brunswick, she has published both academic literature under her own name and poetry under the pen name Kathy Mac.

== Life and career ==
Kathy McConnel was born on July 17, 1961, in Peterborough Ontario. She got her BFA in Art History in 1986 from the Nova Scotia College of Art and Design. Her involvement in writing communities includes:

- Member of the League of Canadian Poets and the Writers’ Federations of both New Brunswick and Nova Scotia
- Edits the Living Archives series produced by the Feminist Caucus
- Active in the WolfTree Writers, a Fredericton-based women’s writing group
- Founding member of the Stand and Deliver performance group, originating at St. Thomas University in 2009.
- Is one third of the ruling triumvirate of Fredericton NB’s Odd Sundays reading series.

== Works ==
Kathy Mac wrote Unnatural Habitats, Published on the Storyspace platform in 1994 in The Eastgate Quarterly Review of Hypertext Volume 3, Number 3, and bundled with Kathryn Cramer's In Small and Large Pieces;

Her 2002 poetry collection Nail Builders Plan for Strength and Growth (Roseway Press) was a shortlisted finalist for the Governor General's Award for English-language poetry at the 2002 Governor General's Awards, and won the Gerald Lampert Award in 2003.

Her chapbook, Reunion: Drawings (2004), was co-produced with artist Elizabeth MacKenzie,

Her second poetry collection, The Hundefraulein Papers, (Roseway Press) was published in 2009,

Her third poetry collection, Human Misunderstanding, was published in 2017. (Roseway Press) was shortlisted for the Fiddlehead Poetry Book prize of the New Brunswick Book Awards.

Her first academic work, Pain, Porn and Complicity: Women Heroes from Pygmalion to Twilight, was published in 2012. This is a book of essays on pop culture.

She has written essays, including Omar Khadr Is Not Harry Potter 2009.

== See also ==
- List of electronic literature authors, critics, and works
- Digital poetry
- E-book#History
- Electronic literature
- Hypertext fiction
- Interactive fiction
- Literatronica
