= Alex Gil (scholar) =

Scholar of digital humanities and Caribbean studies

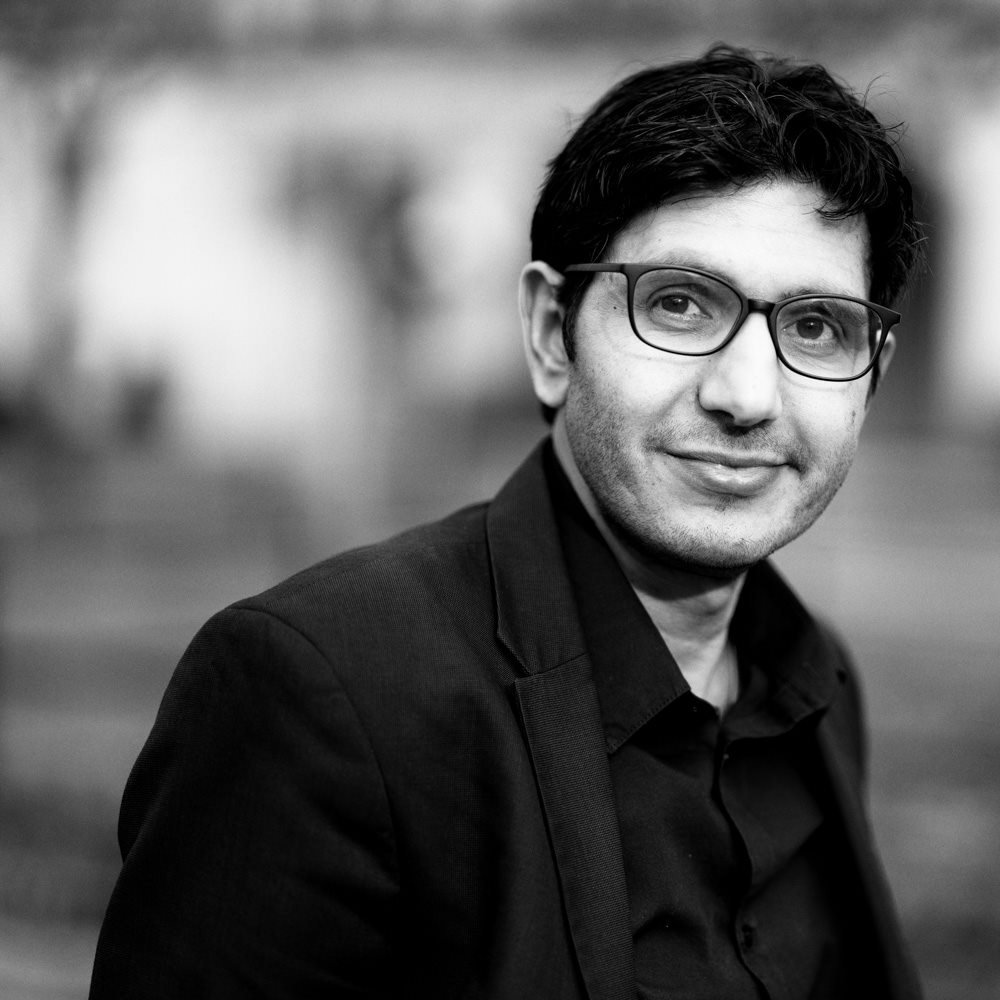
- Born: 1973 (age 52–53)
- Occupation: Senior Professor
- Writing career
- Genre: Electronic literature
- Notable work: known for his discovery of an early manuscript of Aimé Césaire's unfinished play Et les chiens se taisaient.

Alex Gil (born 1973) is a scholar of digital humanities and Caribbean studies. He is a Senior Lecturer II and Associate Research Faculty at the Department of Spanish and Portuguese at Yale University. He is a leading scholar in the field of digital humanities. Gil is a founder of the Group for Experimental Methods in the Humanities at Columbia University, which focuses on rapid prototyping of new forms of digital scholarship.

== Notable Work ==
In Caribbean studies, Gil is known for his discovery of an early manuscript of Aimé Césaire's unfinished play Et les chiens se taisaient. His research demonstrated that Césaire began writing the play in 1941 and that it originally focused on the Haitian Revolution. Through his work in digital humanities, Gil has led a series of high-profile initiatives that use digital and computational technologies for social justice. The Puerto Rico Mapathon for Hurricane Relief combined digital humanities knowledge with humanitarian interventions, bringing together participants at universities across the United States to improve the Open Street Map used by rescue workers responding to Hurricane Maria in Puerto Rico. Torn Apart/Separados, a series of rapidly produced data visualizations, responded to the Trump administration family separation policy announced by the United States government in 2018. The project located 113 shelters used to house children separated from their parents at the Mexico-United States Border and has been identified as "part of a growing vanguard of interdisciplinary researchers combining 21st-century technical skills and classical research practices to do a new kind of cultural interpretation -- and sometimes activism." In response to the shortage of personal protective equipment (PPE) at the beginning of the COVID-19 pandemic, Gil led the Covid Maker Response at Columbia University, using 3D printing to become a main supplier of face shields in New York City. Gil was also a leader of Ethnic Studies Rise, a project in response to Harvard University's decision to deny tenure to Lorgia Garcia Peña. For his notable contributions to digital humanities, libraries, and social justice, Gil was the recipient of the Library Journal's 2020 Movers and Shakers Award.

== Education ==
Gil received a Ph.D. in English Language and Literature from the University of Virginia in 2012, an M.A. in English Language and Literature from the University of Virginia in 2005, and a B.A. in English from Florida International University in 1999. He also studied at Ecole Normale Supérieure.
