= Marie-Laure Ryan =

Swiss literary scholar and critic (born 1946)

- Born: 1946 (age 79–80); Geneva, Switzerland
- Education: University of Geneva University of Utah University of California San Diego
- Children: Caitlin Ryan, Duncan Ryan

Marie-Laure Ryan (Geneva, 1946) is an independent literary scholar and critic. She has written several books and articles on narratology, fiction, and cyberculture and has been awarded several times for her work. She attended the University of Geneva to study literature as an undergraduate, before moving to the United States in 1968. attending graduate school at the University of Utah, where she received her M.A. in Linguistics and German, alongside a Ph.D in French. She later obtained a Bachelor's degree in Computer Science from the University of California San Diego.

She has worked as a consultant and software engineer and has published over fifty articles, translated into several languages and dedicated, in particular, to the concept of digital narrative, narrative theory, genre theory, linguistic approaches to literature, and digital culture and given numerous invited lectures. In Avatars of Story, she embraces a transmedial definition of narrative based on cognitive premises. She currently resides in Bellvue, Colorado where she worked as a Scholar in Residence at the University of Colorado from 2009 to 2010 before working as a Gutenberg Fellow at Johannes Gutenberg University, from 2010 to 2011. She edited the Johns Hopkins Guide to New Media and Digital Textuality with Lori Emerson and Benjamin Robertson, which was published in 2014.

== Awards ==
- Awarded the 1992 Annual Prize for Independent Scholars by the Modern Language Association for Possible Worlds, Artificial Intelligence and Narrative Theory
- Awarded the 2002 Jeanne and Aldo Scaglione Prize for Comparative Literary Studies from the Modern Language Association for Narrative as Virtual Reality
- 2001-2002 Recipient of Guggenheim Fellowship. Project: Literary Cartography
- Awarded the 2017 Wayne Booth award for lifetime achievement by the International Society for the Study of Narrative

== Bibliography ==
- Narrating Space, Spatializing Narrative. Where Narrative Theory and Geography Meet (Columbus: Ohio State University Press, 2016. ISBN 978-0-8142-1299-8)
- Narrative as Virtual Reality 2: Revisiting Immersion and Interactivity in Literature and Electronic Media (Baltimore: Johns Hopkins University Press, series Parallax, 2015)
- Avatars of Story. (University of Minnesota Press, series Electronic Mediations, 2006)
- Possible Worlds, Artificial Intelligence and Narrative Theory. (Bloomington: Indiana University Press, 1991)
