= Diane Gromala =

Computer scientist

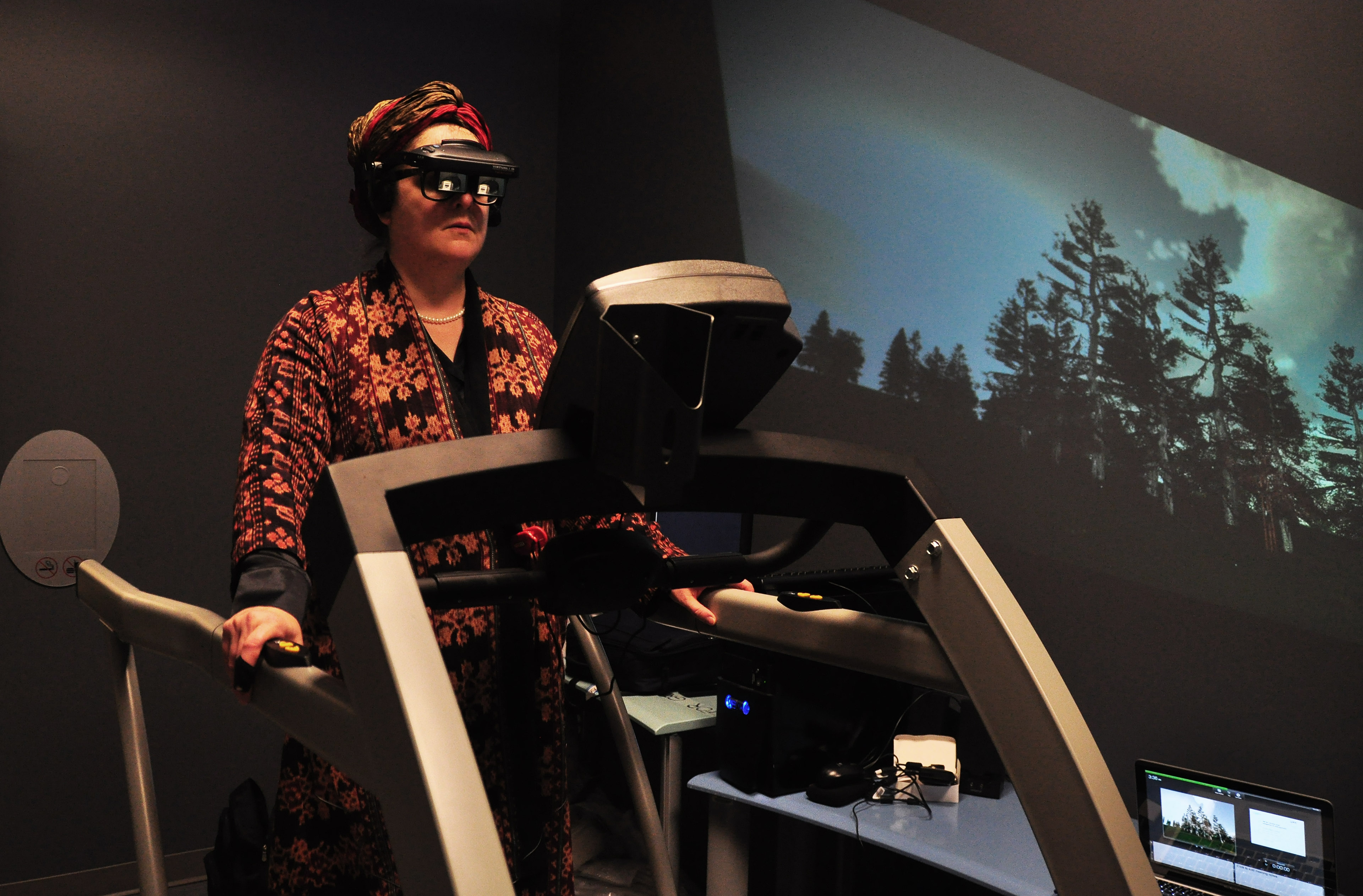
- Gromala in 2011
- Education: University of Michigan, Yale University, Plymouth University
- Scientific career
- Fields: Computer science – HCI, virtual reality, health research, design
- Workplaces: School of Interactive Arts and Technology, Simon Fraser University

Diane Gromala (born 24 February 1960) is a Canadian Research Chair and a Professor at the Simon Fraser University School of Interactive Arts and Technology Her research works at the confluence of computer science, media art and design, and has focused on the cultural, visceral, and embodied implications of digital technologies, particularly in the realm of chronic pain.

== Education ==
Gromala received her bachelor's degree (BFA) in Design & Photography from the University of Michigan in 1982, her Master of Fine Arts (MFA) degree from Yale University in 1990, and her PhD in Human Computer Interaction from Plymouth University in 2007.

== Career ==
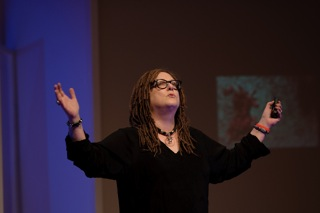
Diane Gromala gives TEDx talk: "Curative Powers of Wet, Raw Beauty"

From 1982 to 1990, Gromala worked in industry as art director for MacWorld and Apple Computer. Gromala was one of the first artists to work with immersive virtual reality (VR), beginning with Dancing with the Virtual Dervish. Co-created with choreographer Yacov Sharir in 1990 at the Banff Centre for the Arts' Art & Virtual Environments residency, this piece has been exhibited worldwide from 1993-2004. Gromala subsequently designed immersive VR for stress-reduction, anxiety-reduction, and pain distraction during chemotherapy at Georgia Tech. Gromala's work has been used in over 20 hospitals and clinics.

Gromala is the founding director of the Chronic Pain Research Institute, an interdisciplinary team of artists, designers, computer scientists, neuroscientists, and medical doctors investigating how new technologies—ranging from virtual reality and visualization to social media—may be used as a technological form of analgesia and pain management. With Jay Bolter, Gromala is the co-author of Windows and Mirrors: Interaction Design, Digital Art and the Myth of Transparency. This book was based on her experience as the Art Gallery Chair for SIGGRAPH 2000, which had the greatest number of interactive artworks in its history. Her work is widely published in the domains of Computer Science, Interactive Art and Interaction Design. Her pioneering virtual reality work has been featured on the BBC, CNN, the Discovery Channel, and the New York Times.

Gromala was a faculty member at the University of Texas at Austin; the University of Washington, where she headed the New Media Research Lab; a member of the Human Interface Technology Lab (HITLab); at graduate programme for Information Design at Georgia Tech's School of Literature, Communication and Culture (LCC); and a member of the renowned GVU (Graphics, Visualization & Usability) Center. She is currently a professor at Simon Fraser University (SFU) in Vancouver, Canada.

Gromala published early cultural and design criticism under the pseudonym Putch Tu, notably the essays "Route 666: Transgressing the Information Superhighway" and "Hangin' at the Zeitgeist" during the 1990s, as well as "Abject Subjectivities" in the American Center for Design Journal. The persona allowed Gromala, then working across graphic design, technology, and academia, to introduce cultural and media theory into design discourse at a time when theoretical writing was viewed with suspicion by many practitioners and educators.

“Route 666: ...transgressing the information superhighway" was originally published in the premiere issue of Infobahn magazine in 1995, with its cover photograph identified in the magazine as Putch Tu, Gromala's pseudonym.

=== Awards ===
In 2017, Gromala has awarded the grand prize at Stanford University’s Brainstorm VR/AR Innovation Lab competition, along with colleagues Faranak Farzan and Sylvain Moreno.

== Selected publications ==
- Bolter, Jay; Gromala, Diane (2003). Windows and Mirrors: Interaction Design, Digital Art, and the Myth of Transparency. Cambridge, MA, USA: MIT Press. ISBN 978-0262025454.
- Cole, Amelia W.; Quesnel, Denise T.; Pekçetin, Serkan; Gromala, Diane; O'Brien, Heather; Antle, Alissa N.; Riecke, Bernhard E. (2017). Integrating Affective Responses and Gamification into Early Reading Acquisition Software Applications. Annual Symposium on Computer-Human Interaction in Play. New York, NY, USA: ACM. pp. 73–85. doi:10.1145/3130859.3131433. ISBN 978-1-4503-5111-9.
