= Judith Pintar =

American sociologist, author and Celtic harpist

Judith Pintar is a sociologist and author of interactive fiction. As the Director of the Game Studies and Design Program, she teaches game studies, narrative design, and Southeastern European Studies at the University of Illinois, Urbana-Champaign.

She is also a Celtic harp player and a composer of instrumental music, performing her albums that combine harp music and storytelling internationally.

== Biography and Career ==
Pintar received a master's degree in Anthropology and a PhD in Sociology from the University of Illinois at Urbana-Champaign (UIUC) with a concentration in science and technology studies, and an area focus on the former Yugoslavia. Currently she is Teaching Associate Professor and Acting BS/IS Program Director at the UIUC School of Information Sciences, as well as a faculty affiliate at the Illinois Informatics Institute where she teaches the design and programming of Interactive Fiction. She was noted as one of 54 instructors ranked as excellent in Spring 2024.

== Works ==
=== Interactive fiction ===
In 1991, Pintar wrote and designed CosmoServe, using an early game design system for interactive fiction (IF), Adventure Game Toolkit (AGT) developed by Mark Welch and David Malmberg. This game simulates the interface of Compuserve Information Service (CIS), the first major online service provider before and during the early years of the World Wide Web. The game won the 5th Annual Softworks AGT game-writing contest in 1991. The following year, 1992, she organized a team of Compuserve Gamer's Forum members and was the principal designer for creating Shades of Gray: an Adventure in Black and White. This game won the 6th Annual AGT contest in the group category. Shades of Gray is “generally considered the finest AGT game of all time.” The collaborative authorship of the game is referenced as an example of the kinds of creative possibilities that emerged within the early online IF community. Both games were published in a book and CD by David Gerrold, Fatal Distractions: 87 Of the Very Best Ways to Get Beaten, Eaten, Maimed, and Mauled on Your PC, (Waite Group, 1994).

=== Non-fiction work ===
With psychologist Steven J. Lynn, she co-authored Hypnosis: A brief history. This multidisciplinary work covers the history of hypnosis as well as the current contexts and controversies for its practice.

=== Critical Studies ===
Her critical works include:

Pintar, J. & S.J. Lynn. 2008. Hypnosis: A brief history. Oxford: Blackwell-Wiley.

Pintar, J. 2020. The Valley Between Us: Narrative manipulation and information bias in the racial segregation of Milwaukee. In W. Aspray and M. Ocepek (Eds.), Deciding Where to Live: Information Studies on Where to Live in America. (pp. 177–210). Rowman & Littlefield. This anthology explores how media and information technology shape housing choices and cultural understanding.

Pintar, J. 2021. Stories from the Other Notebook: The poetics of encounter in post-war Croatia. In W. Leggett and I.F. Leggett (Eds.), Field Stories: Teaching the Relevance of Anthropology in the 21st Century. (pp. 23–38). Lexington Press.

Pintar, J. 2022. Not Your Grandmother’s Family Tree: Technology-mediated kinship & practices of privacy in genetic-genealogy networks. In W. Aspray (Ed.), Information Issues for Older Americans. (pp. 221–246). Rowman & Littlefield.

Pintar, J. & D. Hopping. 2023. Information Sciences: The basics. Oxford: Routledge.

Pintar, J. 2023. Invisible, Aesthetic, and Enrolled Listeners across Storytelling Modalities: Immersive preference as situated player type. Convergence: The International Journal of Research into New Media Technologies.

Pintar, J. & L. Bievenue. 2024. Playful by Design: A third space community of practice for game studies & design. International Journal of Games and Social Impact. 2(1), 8-27.

== Discography and Music ==
=== Music and performance ===
One of the first musicians signed by the New Age record label Narada Productions in the 1980s, Pintar released three recordings of original music for Celtic harp on their Sona Gaia imprint. Selected compositions were also included on several Narada compilations. Her recordings are now owned and distributed by Universal Music Group.

Pintar performed internationally during the 1980s as a harp player and storyteller. Her popular non-fiction book, The Halved Soul: Retelling the Myths of Romantic Love, and the liner notes on her albums and CDs, incorporated stories and poetry that were originally performed.

=== Solo recordings ===
- Secrets from the Stone (1984)
- Changes like the Moon (1987)
- At Last the Wind (1990)
- Quiet Conversation (1997)

=== Compilation appearances ===
- Sona Gaia Collection (1990),
- Faces of the Harp (1997)
- Narada Film and Television Music Sampler (2003)
