= Claire Dinsmore =

American jeweller, designer and new media artist (born 1961)

Claire Allan Dinsmore
- Born: 1961 (age 64–65)
- Occupations: Jeweller, designer and new media artist

Claire Allan Dinsmore (born 1961) is a new media and crafts artist.

Dinsmore was born in Princeton, New Jersey in 1961.

Dinsmore received her BFA from Parsons School of Design/The New School for Social Research in 1985. She spent a summer in Japan in 1982, which provides a Japanese sense of harmony to her work. After this, she studied at the Fashion Institute of Technology in New York from 1987 through 1988. Dinsmore completed her MFA from Cranbrook Academy of Art, Michigan in 1993.

She began her artistic career as a jewellery artist, moving later to net art and hypertext. She worked with the trAce Online Writing Center and is a freelance designer of Studio Cleo.

== Artwork ==
Dinsmore's artwork is included in the collections of the Smithsonian American Art Museum and the Museum of Fine Arts Houston. Her work is also in the permanent collections of the American Craft Museum, The National Museum of American Art, Smithsonian Institution, The Montreal Museum of Art, The Museum of Fine Arts in Houston, and The Dorsky Museum.

She has participated in many expositions, including Young Americans, American Craft Museum in 1988, A Movable Feast : Helen Williams Drutt Collection, Fort Wayne Museum of Art, Fort Wayne et voyage in 1993, Sculptural Concerns : Contemporary American Metalworking in 1994.

== Writing ==
Dinsmore founded and published Cauldron & Net, a collection of electronic literature, from 1997 to 2002. These files are now being served on The NEXT Museum, Library, and Preservation Space, an online digital repository and museum. In 1999, her work was selected as a Pushcart Prize nominee.

Her Hypertext/media work has been published in electronic literature journals as Beehive, The Iowa Review Web, Riding the Meridian, frAme, The Blue Moon Review, and Leonardo Magazine among others.

Pronunciation: 'fut' or: A tool and its means, in Riding the Meridian, 1997. N. Katherine Hayles writes that this work "renders the fetishized and fragmented female body as culturally scripted technology.

The Dazzle as Question in frAme, 2000 and restored in The NEXT Museum, Library, and Preservation Space.
