= Lillian-Yvonne Bertram =

American poet

Lillian Yvonne Bertram
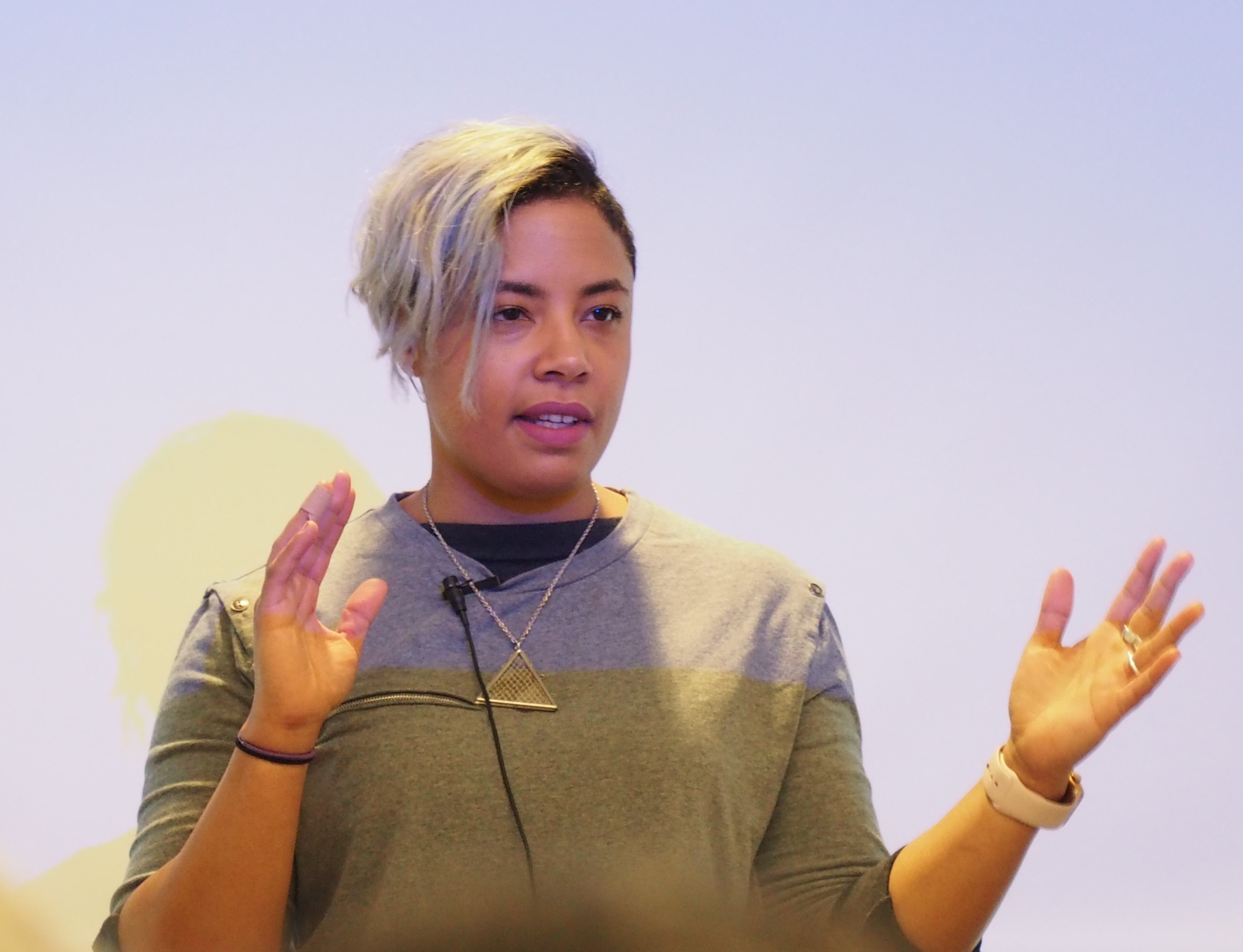
- Bertram in 2018
- Occupations: Associate Professor, University of Maryland

Academic background
- Education: PhD, University of Utah MFA, University of Illinois BA, Carnegie Mellon University (2006)
- Thesis: Personal science (2015 h)

Lillian-Yvonne Bertram is an American poet known for their work on poetry and digital storytelling.

== Education and career ==
Bertram holds a PhD in Literature & Creative Writing from the University of Utah, in addition to degrees from Carnegie Mellon University and the University of Illinois at Urbana-Champaign. Bertram is an associate professor at the University of Maryland.

== Writings ==
Bertram is known for their work on poetry, African-American poetry, poetics, digital storytelling, digital and computational poetics, media arts, and pedagogy. Their first book, But a Storm is Blowing From Paradise is a series of poems that make note of mental and physical landscapes that portray the connection with body, space, time, and love.

Bertram has published other books including Personal Science, a work that explores some occurrences that can result from obsessive thinking. In April 2016, a slice from the cake made of air, was published and it processes the physical and mental trauma of abortions, as well as sexual desire and contemporary culture. Published on December 1, 2019, Travesty Generator consists of poetry generated using an open-source coding and presents how the black experience has become homogenized, branded, and codified for the dissemination by capitalism.

== Selected publications ==
- Bertram, Lillian-Yvonne (2019). Travesty generator. [Blacksburg, Virginia]. ISBN 978-1-934819-84-5.
- Bertram, Lillian-Yvonne (2012). But a storm is blowing from paradise : poems (1st ed.). Pasadena, CA: Red Hen Press. ISBN 9781597091688.
- Bertram, Lillian-Yvonne (2017). Personal science. North Adams, Massachusetts. ISBN 978-1-936797-91-2. OCLC 962750135.
- Bertram, Lillian-Yvonne (2016). A slice from the cake made of air (First ed.). Pasadena, CA: Red Hen Press. ISBN 978-1-59709-341-5.

== Awards and honors ==
In 2011, Bertram received the Benjamin Saltman Poetry Award for their book But a Storm Is Blowing from Paradise. Bertram was the 2015 recipient of a National Endowment for the Arts Creative Writing Poetry Fellowship, and the 2017 recipient of the Harvard University Woodberry Poetry Room Creative Grant. In 2020 Bertram received the Anna Rabinowitz Prize for Travesty Generator, which was also a nominee for the National Book Award for Poetry.
