= Tina La Porta =

- Born: 1967 (age 58–59); Chicago, IL
- Education: Columbia College, Chicago and School of Visual Arts, NY
- Known for: Voyeur_Web, Re:mote_corp@REALities, Side Effects, Medicine Ball
- Movement: internet art, feminist art, new media art, digital art
- Website: http://www.tinalaporta.net/

Tina La Porta is a Miami-based digital artist who "focuses on issues surrounding identity in the virtual space". She was born in Chicago, Illinois in 1967. Her early work could be characterized as net:art or internet art. In 2001 she collaborated with Sharon Lehner on My Womb the Mosh Pit, an artistic representation of Peggy Phelan's Unmarked. La Porta is known for political and feminist art that explores gender, bodies and media such as the 2003 installation Total Screen which consists of enlarged Polaroid photographs of veiled men and women in TV news coverage after the events of 9/11. Later work explores mental illness and pharmaceuticals. In 2012 she presented Medicine Ball at the Robert Fontaine Gallery as part of the "Warhol is Over?" exhibition; this followed a 2011 presentation of All the Pills in My House, also at Fontaine's gallery. In 2015 she participated in the 40-person Annual Interest exhibition at the Young at Art Museum.

== Early life and education ==
Porta was born in Chicago, Illinois, in 1967. She received a Bachelor of Arts from Columbia College in 1990 and a Master of Fine Arts, School of Visual Arts in New York, NY in 1994.

== Work ==
net.works + avatars, 1997

Distance, 1999

Re:mote_corp@REALities, 2001

Voyeur_Web, 2001

My Womb the Mosh Pit (with Sharon Lehner), 2001

Total Screen, 2003

All the Pills in My House, 2011

Medicine Ball, 2012

Side Effects, 2018

=== Solo exhibitions ===
Voyeur_Web, 2001

Total Screen, 2003

Side Effects, 2018
