= Christy Dena =

Australian writer, game designer, and scholar

- Citizenship: Australia
- Website: https://www.christydena.com

Christy Dena is an Australian writer, game designer, and scholar. Her scholarship and design practice in transmedia storytelling has been widely cited, especially for promoting the term "cross-media storytelling". She is also known for defining the term "transmedial fictions" for The Johns Hopkins Encyclopedia of Digital Textuality. She created her own studio, Universe Creation 101, where she creates original projects and does consultations and freelance work. She likes to combine live social experiences with online technology, traditional forms of screen (film and games) and paper-based objects (tabletop and books).

== Life, education, and career ==
Dena completed her PhD in media, Narrative, and Game Studies at the University of Sydney in 2009. Her dissertation on transmedia, Transmedia Practice: Theorising the Practice of Expressing a Fictional World across Distinct Media and Environments "put her on the [transmedia] map."

Dena was the first Digital Writer in Residence for the Australia Council for the Arts and the Queensland University of Technology at The Cube, where she created the large installation "Robot.She currently serves as the Program Co-ordinator of the Master of Creative Industries at the SAE Creative Media Institute, Brisbane. She has worked on games for Cisco and Nokia, and is a member of the International Academy of Television Arts and Sciences (Emmys).

She has served as a mentor; is supervising Artistic Fellows at the CEFIMA, Norwegian Film School; and is teaching at Griffith University. Dena works closely with unceded Boonwrrung Country. In 2010, she presented a TedXTransmedia talk on Dare to Design. In 2012, she was the Digital Writing Ambassador for the Emerging Writers Festival. She has also exhibited her work, such as Recharge at the 6th International Biennial of Media Art.

== Selected works and publications ==
- Dena, Christy (2005). "Elements of 'interactive drama': Behind the virtual curtain of Jupiter Green". Performance Paradigm. 1.
- Dena, Christy (2007). "Capturing polymorphic creations: towards ontological heterogeneity and transmodiology". Proceedings of the 4th Australasian Conference on Interactive Entertainment. RMIT University, Melbourne: 1–8.
- Dena, Christy (2008). "The future of digital media culture is all in your head: an argument for integration cultures" (PDF). Leonardo Electronic Almanac. 16.
- Dena, C. (2008). "Emerging Participatory Culture Practices: Player-Created Tiers in Alternate Reality Games". Convergence. 14 (1): 41–57. doi:10.1177/1354856507084418.
- Dena, C (2008) "[META] The Designer-Academic Problem" considers the relationships between game design and academic work.
- Dena, Christy (2009). Transmedia Practice: Theorising the Practice of Expressing a Fictional World across Distinct Media and Environments. University of Sydney.
- Dena, Christy (2009). "Beyond Multimedia, Narrative, and Game: The Contributions of Multimodality and Polymorphic Fictions". In Page, Ruth (ed.). New Perspectives on Narrative and Multimodality. doi:10.4324/9780203869437. ISBN 9781135254612.
- Dena, Christy (2012). "The scaredy cat factor". In Pickering, K (ed.). The emerging writer : an insider's guide to your writing journey. Emerging Writers' Festival, Australia. pp. 3–6. ISBN 978-0-646-57789-0.
- Dena, Christy (2016). "Finding a way: reducing design schema friction in narrative design" (PDF). Authors & Digital Games Research Association DiGRA.
- Dena, Christy (2018) "DIYSPY - Live Remote Play at Computer Human Interaction (CHI) Play'18" was a Live game experience using zoom and an app.

=== Alternative Reality Games ===
Dena has worked on alternate reality games.

Nokia's Conspiracy for Good, Cisco's The Hunt, and the Australian Broadcasting Company's Bluebird AR. She has also created touch-screen installations for The Cube (Robot University) at Queensland University of Technology and at the Experimenta Biennial of Media Art.

AUTHENTIC IN ALL CAPS (2013) was a crowd-funded project inspired after the passing of her mother, which led to her contemplating her own mortality. This is a radio drama (termed a "web audio adventure) with a large voice cast and an in-game browser. The protagonist attempts to discover the meaning of death within an overworld and an underworld. It is termed a comedic work "Despite help from her part-time Time Traveling Assistant, she finds her investigation upsets fellow Gambling Philosophers, Ticket Inspectors, Artist Assassins and the Quantum Theorist Crime Boss. Ultimately, her inability to fit in makes everyone involved…really annoyed." The work is both game and digital storytelling.

== Awards ==
Dena has won interactive writing awards from the Australian Writers' Guild award for Interactive Media and WA Premier's Book Award for Digital Narrative for (AUTHENTIC IN ALL CAPS). This work was also a finalist for the Best Writing in a Game Award at the 2012 Freeplay Independent Gaming Festival and was shown at the 2014 Media Arts Show for the Electronic Literature Organization.
