= María Mencía =

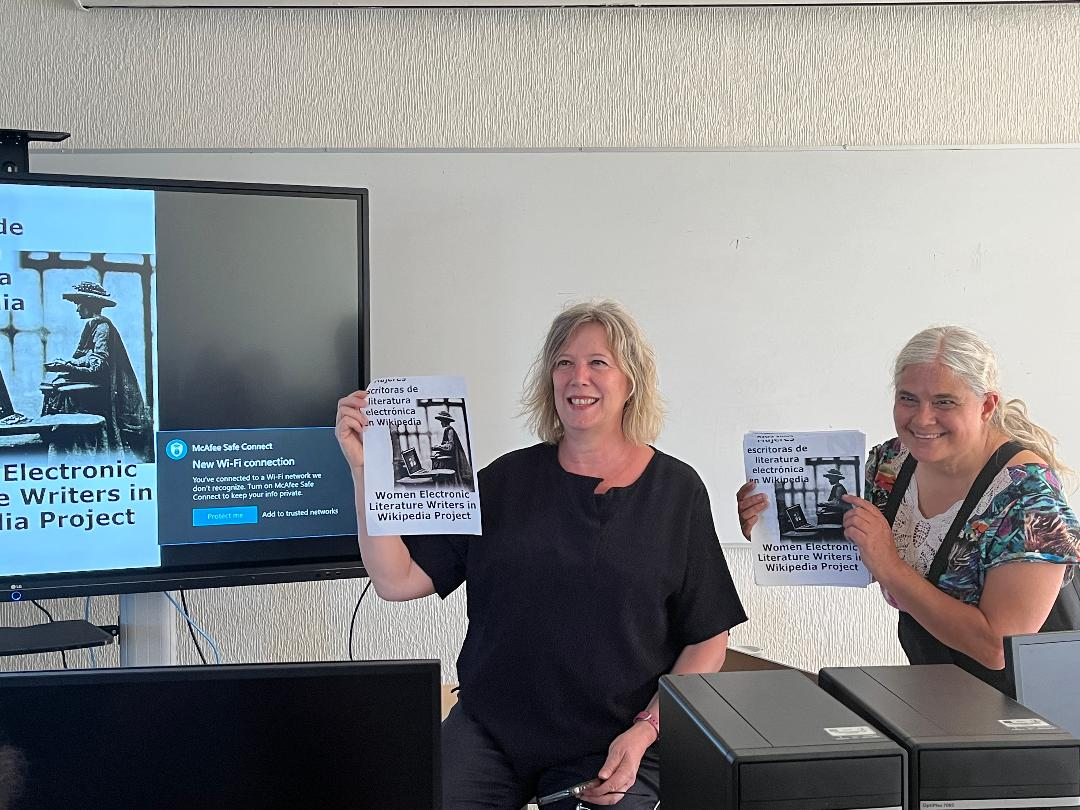
- Mencía (left) and Deena Larsen teaching at the National Autonomous University of Mexico as part of an E-Literature course.
- Education: University of the Arts London, Complutense University of Madrid
- Occupations: Media artist, Professor
- Known for: Linguistics, Film, Visual poetry, Sound poetry, Concrete poetry, Digital poetry, Electronic literature, New media studies
- Notable work: Wordy Mouths, Another Kind of Language, Birds Singing Other Birds’ Songs, The Poem that Crossed the Atlantic
- Website: www.mariamencia.com/index.html

María Mencía (Spanish pronunciation: [maˈɾi.a menˈθi.a]) is a Spanish-born media artist and researcher working as a Senior Lecturer at Kingston University in London, United Kingdom. Her artistic work is widely recognized in the field of electronic literature, and her scholarship on digital textuality has been widely published. She holds a Ph.D. in Digital Poetics and Digital Art at the Chelsea College of Arts of the University of the Arts London and studied English Philology at the Complutense University of Madrid.

She has taught digital literature at UNAM in Mexico.

Mencía's work has been featured in galleries as installation art, presented at conferences and art festivals, published on the Internet, and included in various curated collections of electronic literature, such as The Electronic Literature Collection, Volume 1, an anthology available on the Internet and on compact disc, edited by N. Katherine Hayles, Nick Montfort, Scott Rettberg, and Stephanie Strickland, and the Electronic Literature as a Model of Creativity and Innovation in Practice (ELMCIP) project funded by the Humanities in the European Research Area (HERA). In addition to earning recognition in the English-speaking world, Mencía’s work is frequently mentioned in Spanish media.

== Critical reception ==
Literary critic and media scholar N. Katherine Hayles considers Mencía's work at the intersection of human and nonhuman through media transformation. Within the history of literacy, Hayles takes Mencía's work as an exploration of the disassociation of sound from a stable textual referent in a digital environment. Hayles thus sees Mencía's work as transcending electronic literature as a literary form to offer insight into the "media transformations and the conditions that make literacy possible." Media scholar Christopher Funkhouser, in tracing the evolution of digital poetry, has considered Mencía's work to be "inventing a new media language" through her innovative use of images and sound, much in the tradition of intermedia.

Mencía’s 2001 project ‘’Another Kind of Language’’ has been interpreted as a commentary on linguistic imperialism in the 21st century, juxtaposing and destabilizing Global English with Mandarin Chinese and Arabic. Hypermedia artist/writer Talan Memmott describes the project as an example of "signifying harmonics," and discusses the ways in which the project's transfer from installation piece to Web project diminishes the original auditory experience of the interweaving of the three languages.

Mencía’s Birds Singing Other Birds’ Songs, an interactive experience in which images of birds fly across the screen at the user's prompting, singing human-generated bird calls with the corresponding onomatopoeias written on the bird, has generated significant scholarly and popular attention. Media critic Scott Rettberg conceives of the project, with its abstract use of language, within the tradition of 20th century avant-garde movements, especially Dada sound poetry, rejecting what he sees as the common focus on novelty in electronic literature. Media scholar and archeologist Lori Emerson sees the project as a comment on the translation process, from bird to human languages and back. In her emphasis on electronic literature, Emerson criticizes Birds Singing Other Birds’ Songs for not taking full advantage of the digital medium as an essential component of the message of the piece. In contrast to Emerson, Hayles considers how the project plays with various forms of cognition via the creation of hybrid beings where the human and nonhuman come together to create a new way of knowing. Additionally, Hayles describes Birds as "a reenactment of the history of literacy" in its move from sound to writing to pictorial (digital) iconography. Mencía’s choice of birds as the subject of her work has even been interpreted within the long literary tradition of bird representations as a reflection on the distortion and recreation of orality and the transformation of iconography from human code (writing) into bird's code. Scott Rettberg explains that Maria Mencia's Birds sining other birds songs is a work "that uses the human voice to invoke nature"

== Selected artistic works ==
- "Things Come and Go". 1999.
- "Socratic Enquiries". 1999.
- "Wordy Mouths". 2000.
- "Another Kind of Language". 2002.
- "Birds Singing Other Birds' Songs". 2002. Mencia discusses this work in Narrabase. This was also in the Electronic Literature Organization's Electronic Literature Collection volume 1.
- "Vocaleyes". 2001.
- "Audible Writing Experiments". 2004.
- "Cityscapes: Social Poetics/Public Textualities". 2005.
- "Autocalligraphy: Electronic generative handwriting". 2006.
- "Accidental Meaning". 2007.
- "Generative Poems". 2008.
- "Connected Memories". 2009.
- "Series 1: the alphabetic". 2011.
- "string-code". 2011.
- "Transient Self-Portrait" (in Spanish). 2012. Mencia discusses this work in #WomenTechLit
- "The Upside-Down Chandelier". 2013.
- "Words Unstable on the Table". 2013.
- "Gateway to the World". 2014–2020.
- "The Winnipeg: The Poem That Crossed the Atlantic". 2018.
- "Voces invisibles: mujeres víctimas del conflicto colombiano". 2020.

== Selected scholarly publications ==
- Mencía, María (2003). From Visual Poetry to Digital Art: Image Sount-Text, Convergent Media, and the development of New Media Languages (PDF) (Ph.D.). Chelsea College of Art and Design, University of the Arts London.
- Mencía, María (2014) [1st edition 2009]. "Chapter 22: María Mencía (Excerpt from Thesis)". In Elkins, James (ed.). Artists with PhDs: On the New Doctoral Degree in Studio Art (2nd ed.). Washington, DC: New Academic Publishing. pp. 419–428. ISBN 978-0981865454.
- Mencía, María (2011). "New Media ArtPoetry: A Reflection on Practice". In Masucci, Lello; di Rosario, Giovanna (eds.). OLE Officiana di Lettertura Elettronica. Naples: Atelier Multimediale Edizione. pp. 332–344.
- Mencía, María (2011). "Introduction: From the Page to the Screen to Augmented Reality: New Modes of Language-Driven Mediated Research". Journal of Writing in Creative Practice. 4 (1): 3–7. doi:10.1386/jwcp.4.1.3_7.
- Mencía, María (2011). "Connected memories: Contextualising creative research practice". Journal of Writing in Creative Practice. 4 (1): 37–51. doi:10.1386/jwcp.4.1.37_1.
- Mencía, María (2017). "#WomenTechLit". Computing Literature. 8.
