= Judith Kerman =

Judith Kerman (born New York, 1945) is a poet, publisher, academic, and translator in the U.S. and active from the 1970s.

== Life, education, and career ==
Kerman earned her B.A. with honors from the University of Rochester in 1967 and her M.A. (1973) and Ph.D. (1977) both from the University of Buffalo. In 2002, she was a Fulbright senior scholar to the Dominican Republic.

She was a university professor and dean of Arts and Behavioral Sciences and is now a professor emerita of English at Saginaw Valley State University in Michigan.

She founded Earth's Daughters magazine in Buffalo, New York (1971 to present) and founded and runs Mayapple Press (1978 to present) in Woodstock, New York.

She is vice chair of the Woodstock, New York, Planning Board.

== Works ==
=== Electronic literature ===
An electronic literature (hypertext poem) version of Mothering was published in the Eastgate Systems quarterly review in 1995, and was issued as a paper book, Mothering and Dreams of Rain (Ridgeway Press, 1996).

She wrote the content for a poem authoring system Colloquy, (implemented by Robert Chiles). This was an early generative poem that produced 17-line standzs and were "hypertexts where every word is an anchor and every path limited in length and non-retraceable."

Kerman's graphic poem series, Migrations, (1987) are short poems presented for a computer screen.

=== Poetry ===
- Obsessions (Intrepid Press, Beau Fleuve Series, 1974)
- The Jakoba Poems (White Pine Press, 1976)
- Mothering (Uroboros/Allegheny Mtn Press, 1978)
- Driving for Yellow Cab (Tout Press, 1985)
- Three Marbles (Cranberry Tree Press, 1999) Mothering & Dream of Rain (Ridgeway Press, 1997)
- Plane Surfaces/Plano de Incidencia (Mayapple Press, 2002)
- A Woman in Her Garden: Selected Poems of Dulce Maria Loynaz (White Pine Press, 2002)
- Galvanic Response (March Street Press, 2005) Postcards from America (Post Traumatic Press, 2015)
- Aleph, broken: Poems from My Diaspora (Broadstone Books, 2016)
- definitions (Fomite Press, 2021)

=== Journals ===
- 32 Poems, Calyx, A Journal of Art and Literature by Women, Driftwood, MacGuffin, Salt Hill

=== Translations ===
- Book: Praises & Offenses: Three Women Poets from the Dominican Republic by Aida Cartagena Portalatin, Angela Hernandez Núñez, Ylonka Nacidit Perdomo, translated from the Spanish (BOA Editions, Ltd., 2009, published as a Lannan Selection).
- Entre Dos Silencios/Between Two Silences: Short Fiction by Hilma Contreras (Mayapple Press, 2013)

== Awards and honors ==
- Abbie M. Kopps Poetry Prize; Honorable Mention, Great Lakes Colleges Association New Writers Award.
