= Belén Gache =

Argentine-Spanish novelist

Belén Gache (Buenos Aires, 1960) is an Argentine-Spanish novelist and experimental writer.

Of Spanish and Gibraltarian descent, she was born in Buenos Aires. She lives in Madrid. She graduated from the University of Buenos Aires where she was professor in narratology and literary theory. Her work has diversified into different literary forms. Departing from narrative, she became a pioneer of electronic literature producing since 1996 various forms of expanded and hypertextual writings.

== Narrative ==
Identified with the postmodern literature movement, her novels are characterized by fragmentation, hyper-realism and the use of unreliable narrators. Influenced by minimalism and anti-novel, her fictions are written in first person and present tense by misfit and quasi-paranoid female protagonists. Her first novel Luna India (Indian Moon), was shortlisted in the Planeta Award Biblioteca del Sur, and was published in 1994. Her second novel Divina Anarquia(Divine Anarchy)(1999), deals with the lack of genealogy and the imaginary histories of the narrator. Lunas eléctricas para las noches sin luna (Electric moons for moonless nights)(2004) takes place in 1910, during the celebrations of the 100th anniversary of Argentine Independence, in a Buenos Aires whose population was mainly composed of European immigrants. In this context a detective plot with political connotations is developed, narrated from the point of view of a mythomaniac teenager daughter of Spaniards.

== Experimental and electronic literature ==
In 1995, she created the group and website Fin del Mundo (End of the World), along with Gustavo Romano, Carlos Trilnick and Jorge Haro in Buenos Aires where she put online her first interactive poems.

In 2002 she published El libro del fin del mundo. This physical book also contained a CD-ROM and links to complementary sections on the Internet. It combined pieces of poetry, visual poetry, electronic and multimedia poetry.

In 2004, she published El blog del niño burbuja (The Bubleboy blog) one of the first experiments in fiction blogs.

In 2006 she published on the Internet the Góngora Wordtoys (Soledades), an anthology of her net-poems produced between 1996 and 2006 and one of her most widely known pieces. Here she proposes the exercise of reading as a decoding task as well as a ludic activity. The fourteen net-poems in this anthology are rooted on the historical avant-gardes, using strategies as randomness, tautology, appropriations and are influenced by concrete and conceptual writing. A second collection made in 2011, Gongora WordToys, focuses on the figure of the Spanish Baroque poet Luis de Gongora deconstructing his masterpiece Soledades (Solitudes). This work is reviewed in Electronic Literature as Digital Humanities Contexts, Forms, & Practices. Edited by Dene Grigar & James O’Sullivan Bloomsbury Academic Bloomsbury Publishing Inc. 2021

Since 2013, she has developed the Kublai Moon project, an example of "distributed literature" or "literature across networks", through different media (blogs, automatic poem generator, invented typography, Vimeo, and other platforms 2.0) a linguistic sci-fi saga that tells the story of the moon trip of the narrator's alter ego together with Commander Aukan and robot AI Halim.

== Essays ==
- Book of essays, Escrituras Nomades, del libro perdido al hipertexto (Nomadic Writings, from the lost book to hypertext), (Gijón, Trea 2006), contains researches in expanded, experimental and nonlinear literature, emphasizing the continuity of electronic literature strategies with those of the avant-garde and neo avant-garde literary movements as Dada, concrete poetry, Oulipo, Fluxus or conceptual writing.
- Narrating with New Media: What Happened with What has Happened?
