= Cynthia Lawson =

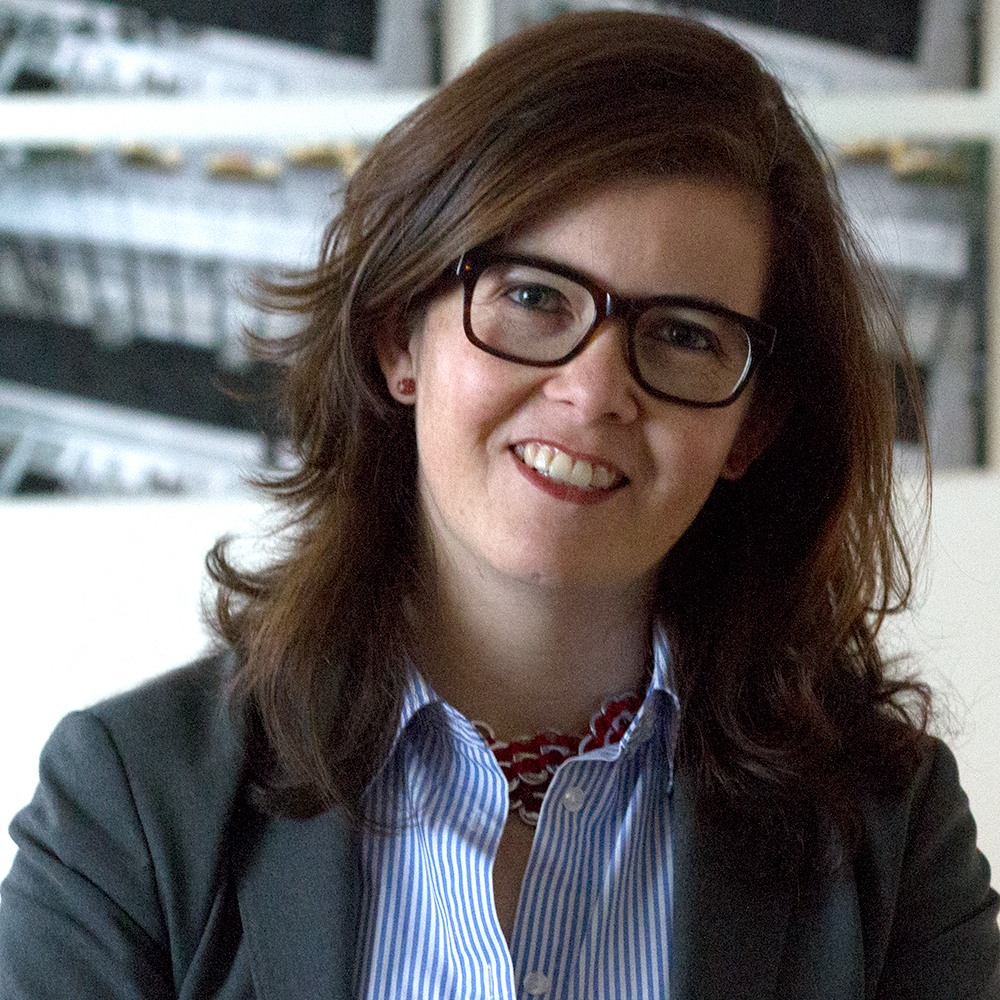
- Lawson in 2014
- Born: Cynthia Lawson Jaramillo; Guatemala

Cynthia Lawson Jaramillo is a digital artist, educator, and technologist. She is Associate Provost for Distributed & Global Education & Associate Professor of Integrated Design in the School of Design Strategies at The New School, and is co-founder and Director of DEED: Development Through Empowerment, Entrepreneurship, and Design. Prior to her current position at The New School, she served at the Director of Integrated Design Curriculum, the Associate Chair in the Department of Core Studies, and the associate director of Integrated Design.

She earned her Bachelor of Science degree in Electrical Engineering at the Universidad de Los Andes in 1997. In 2001 she earned a Master of Professional Studies in Interactive Telecommunications (ITP) at New York University.

She has academic experience at Long Island University, Kanazawa International Design Institute, Escuela de Diseno Alto de Chavon, Columbia University, and New York University. As a consultant she has worked with international organizations such as CARE and the World Bank.

Cynthia Lawson Jaramillo was born in Guatemala and lived in Iran, United States, Colombia, Argentina, and France. She is the daughter of expats. She speaks English, Spanish, and French.

== Artwork ==
Her artwork has been internationally exhibited and performed. Two themes that she frequently explores in her work are: time and transience. Her work has been exhibited and performed at Exit Art, Giacobetti Paul Gallery, HERE Arts, UCLA Hammer Museum (LA), Éphémère (Paris), and the Museums of Modern Art in Bogotá and Medellín (Colombia).

== Publications and presentations ==
Cynthia Lawson has been a contributor to the following academic journals: ISEA, Electronic Literature Collection, Visible Language, Journal of Design Strategies, and the Journal of Design + Management.

Lawson's recent presentations include "TEDxFurmanU", and a keynote presentation at the Global Fashion Conference in Madrid.

== DEED ==
Since 2007, Cynthia Lawson has been an active participant in, and now coordinates, The New School university-wide project DEED: Development Through Empowerment, Entrepreneurship, and Design, which has connected over 50 New School students with artisans in Latin America to support craft-based, income-generating opportunities. Her work with DEED has been featured in the NY Daily News and the TV show LatiNation.
