= Cheryl Sourkes =

Canadian photographer (born 1945)

- Born: September 1, 1945; Montreal, Quebec
- Website: cherylsourkes.com

Cheryl Sourkes (born 1945) is a Canadian photographer, video and new media artist.

== Early life ==
Cheryl Sourkes was born and grew up in Montreal. She had an early interest in photography and had her own darkroom by the time she was eighteen. She studied biology and psychology at McGill University and graduated with a Bachelor of Science. She then moved to Vancouver in 1967 to undertake graduate studies at Simon Fraser University in psychology, and focused on the subject of consciousness, but decided to be an artist.

== Career ==
Sourkes' work is inspired by her experience of the world around her, selected and edited, and raises questions about socio-political and ideological issues. In the 1970s she lived in Vancouver where she began to exhibit her work and in 1984, exhibited her "Memory Room" series in Art and Photography, an exhibition held at the Vancouver Art Gallery. From 1985 to 1992, she lived in Montreal, then in 1993 she settled in Toronto. Most of her early photographic prints are photograms - collaged composites of 'found', recycled or re-processed images. In her works from the 1980s, she linked language, illustration and photography. From 1993 onward, concurrent with her move to Toronto, Sourkes' shifted her methodology and began to use computer-based source imagery found on the World Wide Web or from 2000 on, on webcams, transformed into still images or videos.

She has had many solo shows and been included in group exhibitions, nationally and internationally. In 2005-2007 her work was the subject of the touring retrospective exhibition Cheryl Sourkes: Public Camera, organized by Canadian Museum of Contemporary Photography (shown at the National Gallery of Canada), Ottawa, ON. In 2017, Cheryl Sourkes Networks was shown at Richard Rhodes Dupont Projects in Toronto.

She lives in Toronto where she also works as a writer and curator with exhibitions such as Shadow of the Machine (2002), at Museum London, in London, Ontario, and Katherine Knight: Wind and Water (2004), at the Ottawa Art Gallery, Ottawa, Ontario. In 2021, she was one of the participants in John Greyson's experimental short documentary film International Dawn Chorus Day.

== Collections ==
Her work is included in the collections of the National Gallery of Canada, the Musée national des beaux-arts du Québec, the Vancouver Art Gallery, the Canada Council Art Bank, the Concordia University Art Gallery, the Seattle Art Museum and elsewhere.
