= Jessica Pressman =

American academic

- Occupations: Professor of English and Comparative Literature

Academic background
- Education: Brandeis University; University of California, Los Angeles

Academic work
- Discipline: Electronic literature
- Institutions: San Diego State University
- Website: www.jessicapressman.com

Jessica Pressman is a scholar who studies electronic literature including digital poetry, media studies, and experimental literature. She creates works that examine how technologies affect reading practices that are displayed through several media forms.

== Career ==
She currently teaches at San Diego State University, where she is an Associate Professor of English and Comparative Literature. Pressman co-founded (with Joanna Brooks) SDSU's Digital Humanities Initiative, a faculty-led research initiative for the study of digital technologies and culture. She taught at Yale University from 2008 to 2012, as an Assistant Professor of English. Pressman also was a lecturer for the University of California, San Diego English department from 2013 to 2014.

== Education and early career ==
Jessica Pressman earned her bachelor's degree in English and American Literature, minor in Women's Studies at Brandeis University. Pressman received a Ph.D. in English at the University of California, Los Angeles.

She worked for Cognitive Arts, founded by Roger Schank in 2000, where she became interested in narrative teaching games. She read George Landow's Hypertext and studied under N. Katherine Hayles.

== Academic work ==
Pressman's monograph Bookishness: Loving Books in a Digital Age examines how books still give meaning to our lives in the digital age, by serving not only as media to read through but as objects of attachment in ways that are "sentimental, fetishistic, [and] radical".

Her first book, Digital Modernism: Making it New in New Media (2014), traces a genealogy of born-digital literature back to experimented in literary modernism and models how to adapt close reading methods to electronic literature.

In 2015, Pressman co-wrote Reading Project: A Collaborative Analysis of William Poundstone's Project for Tachistoscope (Bottomless Pit), with Mark C. Marino and Jeremy Douglass, which won the Electronic Literature Organization's "N. Katherine Hayles Award for Literary Criticism of Electronic Literature" (2016). In the case study format, the work examines the interpretation of digital poetics through three methodological approaches: critical code studies, close reading onscreen aesthetics, and data visualizations.

Pressman has also co-edited two volumes: Comparative Textual Media: Transforming the Humanities in a Postprint Era with N. Katherine Hayles (2013) and Book Presence in a Digital Age with Kiene Brillenburg Wurth and Kári Driscoll (2018).

Pressman has authored and co-authored articles on digital literature. A [S]creed for Digital Fiction” provides a manifesto for multilinearity and summarizes the history of hypertext.

Jesica Pressman's 2020 Bookishness: Loving Books in a Digital Age examines the book as an object and symbol to understand why pyscial books are still used in this digital age. Rebecca Brenner Graham explain that this work looks at physical books through an "analytical, scholarly, and theoretical lens". Mike Chaser notes that this work explores the implications of the fear about the end of books in a digital age. Daniela Côrtes Maduro reviewed this work for a Portuguese audience.

== Notable contributions to electronic literature ==
Katherine Hayles explains that Pressman has identified "the aesthetic of bookishness: where literary works examine the nature of the book itself.

== Bibliography ==
- Pressman, Jessica. "The Strategy of Digital Modernism: Young-Hae Chang Heavy Industries's Dakota." Modern Fiction Studies 54. 2 (2008): 302-326.
- Comparative Textual Media: Transforming the Humanities in the Postprint Era, co-edited with N. Katherine Hayles. University of Minnesota Press, 2013. ISBN 978-0-8166-8004-7
- Digital Modernism: making it New in New Media : Columbia University Press, 2014. ISBN 978-0-19-993710-3
- Reading Project: A Collaborative Analysis of William Poundstone's Project for Tachistoscope {Bottomless Pit}, co-written with Mark C. Marino and Jeremy Douglass. University of Iowa Press, 2015. ISBN 1-60938-345-1
- Book Presence in a Digital Age , co-edited with Kiene Brillenburg Wurth and Kári Driscoll. Bloomsbury Press, 2018. ISBN 978-1-5013-2120-7
- Bookishness: Loving Books in a Digital Age : Columbia University Press, 2020. ISBN 978-0-231-19513-3

== Awards and honors ==
- International Fellow/Scholar in Residence at the University of Hamburg Germany as part of the "Poetry in the Digital Age" project funded by the European Research Foundation's Advanced Grant April and May 2023
- Most Influential Faculty Member, SDSU, Department of English and Comparative Literature (2018, 2019, 2021)
- N. Katherine Hayles Award for Literary Criticism of Electronic Literature (2016)
- National Endowment for the Humanities (NEH) Start-Up Grant from Office of Digital Humanities (2015- 2016)
- SDSU Area of Excellence “Digital Humanities and Global Diversity” (2015)
- American Council of Learned Societies (ACLS) for Collaborative Research Fellowship (2012-2013)
- Sarai Ribicoff Teaching Excellence Award, Yale College (2010)
