= Ana María Uribe =

Electronic literature writer

- Born: 1944; Buenos Aires, Argentina
- Died: March 5, 2004 (aged 59–60)
- Known for: Tipoemas y Anipoemas, Deseo-Desejo-Desire, Un Día Movido, El Circo

Ana María Uribe (1944-2004) was an Argentinian poet known for her work within electronic literature, particularly for visual poetry. According to Jeneen Naji, she was a pioneer in developing digital poetry forms and for "pushing the boundaries of material, form, and visuality in her writing practice."

Uribe was best known for her work with Tipoemas y Anipoemas. Uribe created her works by using letters of the alphabet in order to animate her poetry.

Her digital poetry centers around animating letters, and thus needs little translation. However, her work has been translated into Finnish (Marko Niemi) and Romanian (Constantin Mărcușan).

Uribe began making Tipoemas y Anipoemas in 1997, when she was inspired by Christian Morgenstern's Fisches Nachtgesang. She finished the work in 2001. In Tipoemas y Anipoemas, she used animation and disappearing effects in order to bring her work to life. Tipoemas y Anipoemas can be read in both English and Spanish, Uribe's native languages. She continued her work with visual poetry until her death in 2004. Some of her later works include Deseo-Desejo-Desire (2002), Un día movido (2001-2002), and El Circo (2000-2002).

== Work origins and influences ==
In "The Letters Themselves: an interview with Ana Maria Uribe" with Megan Sapner (publisher of Born Digital Poetry) for the Iowa Review Web, Uribe explains that her first literary experiments were in typography, which transformed into digital animations using Flash. She works with typography and motion, which segue into rhythms and repetitions. She terms her poems "Anipoems" to contrast with her static type art and poems from late 60s (Iowa Review Web as cited in The NEXT).

Leonardo Flores explains that "Anipoemas” were created by animating typographic images that "breathed life into letters."

== Works and preservation ==
Electronic Literature Organization's archive and museum, The NEXT, has preserved many of her works, including:

- The Grand Parade (El gran desfile), Skirmish (Escaramuza), Balance (Equilibrio), Orchestra Rehearsal (Ensayo de orquesta) and The Orchestra (La orquesta) are Flash software files first published in Volume 4 of the Iowa Review Web in 2001. Preserved with Ruffle in the NEXT.
- Discipline (Disciplina) was first published in 2002 by Museum of the Essential and Beyond That by Regina Pinto. Preserved with Conifer in the NEXT.
- A Post Card From Java: Reliefs of Borubudur Temple was first published in 2004 by Museum of the Essential and Beyond That by Regina Pinto. Preserved with Conifer in the NEXT.

Her early work Type poems, were exhibited at the 2012 Modern Language Association's Electronic Literature Exhibition.

Jim Andrews, a Canadian visual/sound digital poet, has preserved these works. Andrews explained that her work is important as it visualizes a "poem on the screen as a performance."

Jorge Luiz Antonio (Instituto de Estudos da Linguagem (IEL), Universidade Estadual de Campinas (UNICAMP), Campinas, Brazil, provides a comprehensive description of her work with examples in an undated book review.

Her work also appeared in the digital journals Beehive and Inflect. These have not been preserved.
