= Council of Editors of Learned Journals =

The Council of Editors of Learned Journals emerged from a series of informal gatherings of editors at the Modern Language Association of America (MLA). The gatherings were concerned with the same issues that are the subject matter of the organization to date. They are the funding of journals and issues associated with the peer review of articles, plagiarism, ownership rights, and the more mundane issues of copy editing. The council seeks to offer mentoring services in these areas for new editors. Originally known as Conference of Editors of Learned Journals, it changed its name in 1989 to the current one. The council sponsors sessions at the MLA Convention on presenting its annual journal awards recognizing distinguished achievement for scholarly journals and for creative-writing journals.
