= Lori Emerson =

Media archaeologist

- Born: Ottawa, Ontario (Canada)
- Occupations: Professor, University of Colorado Boulder

Academic background
- Education: SUNY at Buffalo
- Thesis: The Rematerialization of Poetry: From the Bookbound to the Digital (2008)

Academic work
- Discipline: History, Media Studies, Literary Studies, Science and Technology Studies
- Sub-discipline: Media archaeology
- Website: loriemerson.net

Lori Emerson is a media studies professor at the University of Colorado at Boulder and founder of the Media Archaeology Lab, a hands-on lab dedicated to obsolete but still functioning technologies spanning from the late nineteenth century to the early twenty-first century. She is known for her work in the history of technology, media archaeology, digital preservation, and digital archives.

== Education ==
Emerson has a B.A. from the University of Alberta (1998), and M.A. from the University of Victoria (2001) and an M.A. from the University of Buffalo (2004). In 2008 she earned a Ph.D. from the University of Buffalo. She joined the faculty at the University of Colorado at Boulder in 2008. As of 2026, she is a Professor of Media Studies. She is also the founder of University of Colorado's Boulder's Media Archaeology Lab.

== Career ==
Emerson's areas of study include poetics and aesthetics, media archaeology, computer history, telecommunications networks, digital humanities and textuality, digital preservation, and digital archives. Emerson's research focuses on uncovering crisis points in past media, or, points at which there was the possibility, never fully realized, for technologies to become “other” than what they are now. She also tries to undo established narratives of how contemporary technologies came to be by looking at artists and writers’ experiments with, for example, network technologies. Her interest in the predecessors to ASCII art was part of a 2014 story in The Atlantic. Katherine Hayles explains that Emerson theorizes on the combinations of machine and human perspectives.

A component of Emerson's work centers on media archaeology or how to preserve digital memories. The Media Archaeology Lab she founded at the University of Colorado Boulder campus collects obsolete technologies in order to foster study and understanding of them. Carrying the motto "The past must be lived so that the present can be seen," the lab maintains all of these items in working order and allows them to be used at any time. It houses the world's first portable computer, the Osborne 1, as well as video game consoles, typewriters, audiovisual materials, and audio equipment. In exploring the ways in which the Media Archaeology Lab both differs from and adheres to the expectations of a traditional archive, Emerson and coauthor Libi Striegl describe that the Media Archaeology Lab "changes from year to year, depending on who is in the lab and what donations have arrived at our doorstep, and thus it undoes many assumptions about what archives as well as labs should be or do". This form of digital archaeology is a term used by Emerson to describe how people have interacted with computers over time. Her work establishing a media lab has been mentioned by other researchers in the field.

== Selected publications ==
- The Alphabet Game: A bpNichol Reader.
- Beaulieu, John; Emerson, Lori, eds. (2013). Writing surfaces : selected fiction of John Riddell. Waterloo, Ontario, Canada. ISBN 978-1-55458-852-7. OCLC 816764428.
- Emerson, Lori (2014). Reading writing interfaces : from the digital to the bookbound. Minneapolis: University of Minnesota Press. ISBN 978-0-8166-9126-5.
  - Reviewed by the Emily Dickinson Journal, Digital Humanities Quarterly, Huffington Post, and others
- Ryan, Marie-Laure; Emerson, Lori; Robertson, Benjamin J. (2014). The Johns Hopkins guide to digital media. Baltimore. ISBN 9781421412245.
  - Reviewed by the Journal of the Midwest Modern Language Association in 2014
- Wershler, Darren; Emerson, Lori; Parikka, Jussi. The Lab Book: Situated Practices in Media Studies. The University of Minnesota Press. ISBN 978-1-4529-5840-8.
- Emerson, Lori (2025). Other Networks: A Radical Technology Sourcebook. New York: Anthology Editions. ISBN 978-1-944860-65-3.

== Awards and honors ==
In 2015, Emerson received an honorable mention from the Electronic Literature Organization for the N. Katherine Hayles Award for Criticism of Electronic Literature for her work Reading Writing Interfaces. In 2015, she received the ASSETT Teaching With Technology Award from the University of Colorado at Boulder for her work in the Media Archaeology Lab.
