= Videogames for Humans =

2015 anthology of video games writing

Videogames for Humans: Twine Authors in Conversation
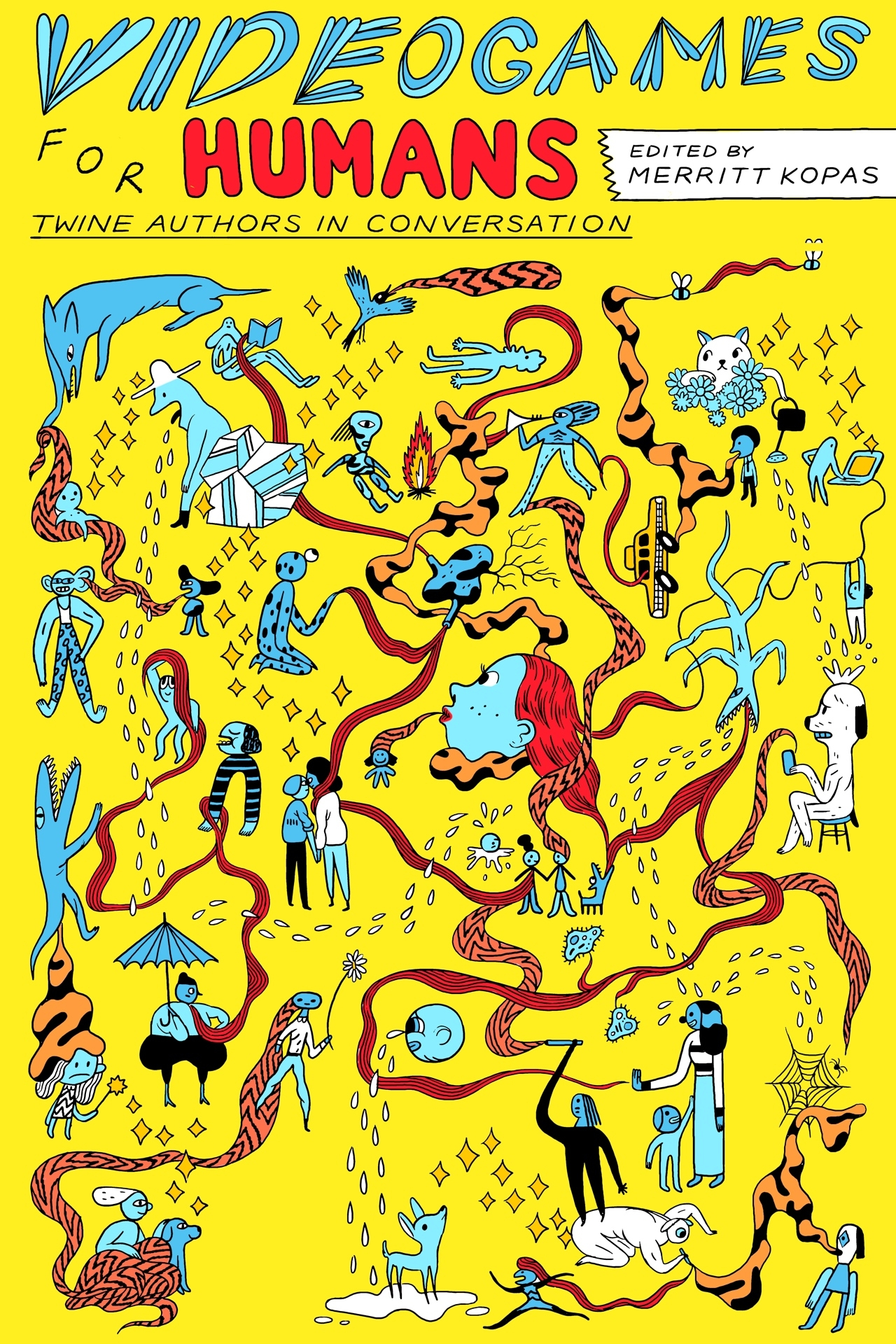
- Editor: merritt k
- Cover artist: Michael DeForge
- Publisher: Instar Books
- Publication date: 2015
- ISBN: 978-0-9904528-4-3

Videogames for Humans: Twine Authors in Conversation is an anthology of readings of video games created in interactive fiction authoring tool Twine. The collection was curated and edited by merritt k and published by Instar Books in 2015. It features readings of 27 games by creatives and critics. The book features works by many LGBTQ contributors and was shortlisted for the Anthology Prize at the 28th Lambda Literary Awards.

== Contents ==
In the introduction, merritt k, the editor, recalls her discovery of Twine in 2012 through the works of Anna Anthropy. Twine is a free software tool which allows users to create interactive fiction video games without any programming knowledge. Twine outputs the work as an HTML file, allowing the game to be played in a web browser.

k writes about how Twine's accessibility and ease of use enables a wider audience to create games, expanding the types of stories that games can tell. k highlights, for example, the prominence of trans women creatives working in Twine, and argues that, as a text-based platform, Twine can better explore sex in its stories without falling into the uncanny valley of typical video game depictions.

The bulk of the book follows, consisting of 27 readings of Twine games by creators and critics, each a chapter long. Each reading alternates between transcripts of the game, and the thoughts of the player, and so reads like a conversation between the game and its player. The book's publisher, Jeanne Thornton, described the format as "Let's Play meets 33 1/3".

=== List of games ===
Game	Written by	Played by
Rat Chaos	Winter Lake	Eva Problems
Fuck That	Benji Bright	Riley MacLeod
Anhedonia	Maddox Pratt	Emily Short
SABBAT	Eva Problems	Imogen Binnie
Horse Master	Tom McHenry	Naomi Clark
Nineteen	Elizabeth Sampat	Patricia Hernandez
scarfmemory	Michael Brough	Anna Anthropy
Removed	Aevee Bee	Lydia Neon
for political lovers, a little utopia sketch	Brienne Reid	Avery McDaldno
Your Lover Has Turned into a Flock of Birds	Miranda Simon	Brienne Reid
Detritus	Mary Hamilton	Auriea Harvey
There Ought to Be a Word	Jeremy Penner	Austin Walker
Negotiation	Olivia Vitolo	Katherine Cross
reProgram	Soha Kareem	Mattie Brice
Mangia	Nina Freeman	Lana Polansky
Sacrilege	Cara Ellison	Soha Kareem
And the Robot Horse You Rode In On	Anna Anthropy	Cat Fitzpatrick
Electro Primitive Girl	Sloane	Aevee Bee
The Message	Jeremy Lonien, Dominik Johann	Squinky
Depression Quest	Zoe Quinn	Toni Pizza
Even Cowgirls Bleed	Christine Love	Leigh Alexander
3x3x3	Kayla Unknown	Cara Ellison
Eden	Gaming Pixie	Alex Roberts
Eft to Newt	Michael Joffe	Pippin Barr
Dining Table	Leon Arnott	Matthew Burns
I’m Fine	Rokashi Edwards	John Brindle
Player 2	Lydia Neon	Elizabeth Sampat

== Reception ==
Reception towards the book was generally positive and it was shortlisted for the LGBT Anthology Prize at the 28th Lambda Literary Awards. Critics praised its breadth, noting the diverse games and views represented. Daniel Joseph, writing in Motherboard, found the chapters reflected the style of the Twine games they critiqued - "contemplative, slow, mysterious and exciting", and that the works covered had enough depth to benefit from the reflection and context on offer. Javy Gwaltney, writing in Paste, likewise noted "there is no shallow end here". Despite the book's length, game designer Robert Yang noted several omissions in its coverage, such k's own games and those by Porpentine. k however had caveated in her introduction that given the thousands of works created in Twine, she did not view the book as being "perfectly representative", but instead "as a dip into a river at a particular moment in time", hoping to inspire others to expand upon its coverage.

Given the anthology nature of the work, critics were divided as to which readings they liked best. Gwaltney found Austin Walker's reading of Jeremy Penner's There Ought to Be a Word his favourite chapter. The game covers a period in Penner's life in the aftermath of a separation as he looks to restart dating. Gwaltney was impressed by how Walker could approach the piece personally through his own experiences of online dating, and also professionally as a critic through his analysis of its use of language and game design. Robin Yang on the other hand, writing in lesbian website Autostraddle, found Walker's commentary to be an unnecessary level of abstraction, preferring instead just to play the game herself. HASTAC scholar Christine Yao's favourite chapter was Naomi Clark’s on Tom McHenry's Horse Master, in it, Clark analyses the source code of the game revealing the hidden mathematics which determine the games outcome. Robin Yang also described the chapter as one of her favourites, but Gwaltney found the lengthy chapter "left [him] mentally exhausted".

In their 2021 critical study of Twine, Twining, authors Anastasia Salter and Stuart Moulthrop described Videogames for Humans as an "indispensable manifesto/anthology" and concluded it was "the best measure of Twine’s cultural impact". In 2023, The Verge included the book in their list of the 40 greatest tech books of all time.
