= Psycho Nymph Exile =

2016 multimedia work by Porpentine

- Cover art
- Author: Porpentine Charity Heartscape
- Illustrator: Neotenomie
- Cover artist: Sloane Leong
- Language: English
- Genre: Science fiction; body horror
- Publisher: Arcadia Missa
- Publication date: December 2016
- Media type: Print; Ebook; stickers; hypertext
- Pages: 188
- ISBN: 978-0-9954961-1-8

Psycho Nymph Exile is a multimedia art piece written and designed by Porpentine Charity Heartscape, with additional work from Neotenomie and Sloane Leong. It comprises the central novella Psycho Nymph Exile, an attached sticker pack, the hypertext poem Girlbeam, the computer graphics poem Probiotic River Therapy, and the web portal Girlshard Portal containing hypertext video games unlocked through keywords in the novella. It was commissioned by the not-for-profit arts organization Rhizome, and released in 2016. Psycho Nymph Exile follows the lovers Vellus and Isidol, an ex-mecha pilot and ex-magical girl respectively, as they try to live out a meager existence. The novella frequently shifts focus onto vignettes in the same setting, unrelated to the two protagonists.

Psycho Nymph Exile deals with themes of trauma and PTSD, and how communities can exploit vulnerable individuals within them. While the term "transgender" is never used in the work, and Porpentine does not describe themselves as transgender, Psycho Nymph Exile has been described and analyzed as a work of transgender literature. Several commentators have described the lives of the book's protagonists and how they are treated as reflective of the transgender experience. Much of the work is drawn from mecha and magical girl anime, with heavy influence from "lowbrow" art like fan fiction and erotic literature.

== Background and design ==
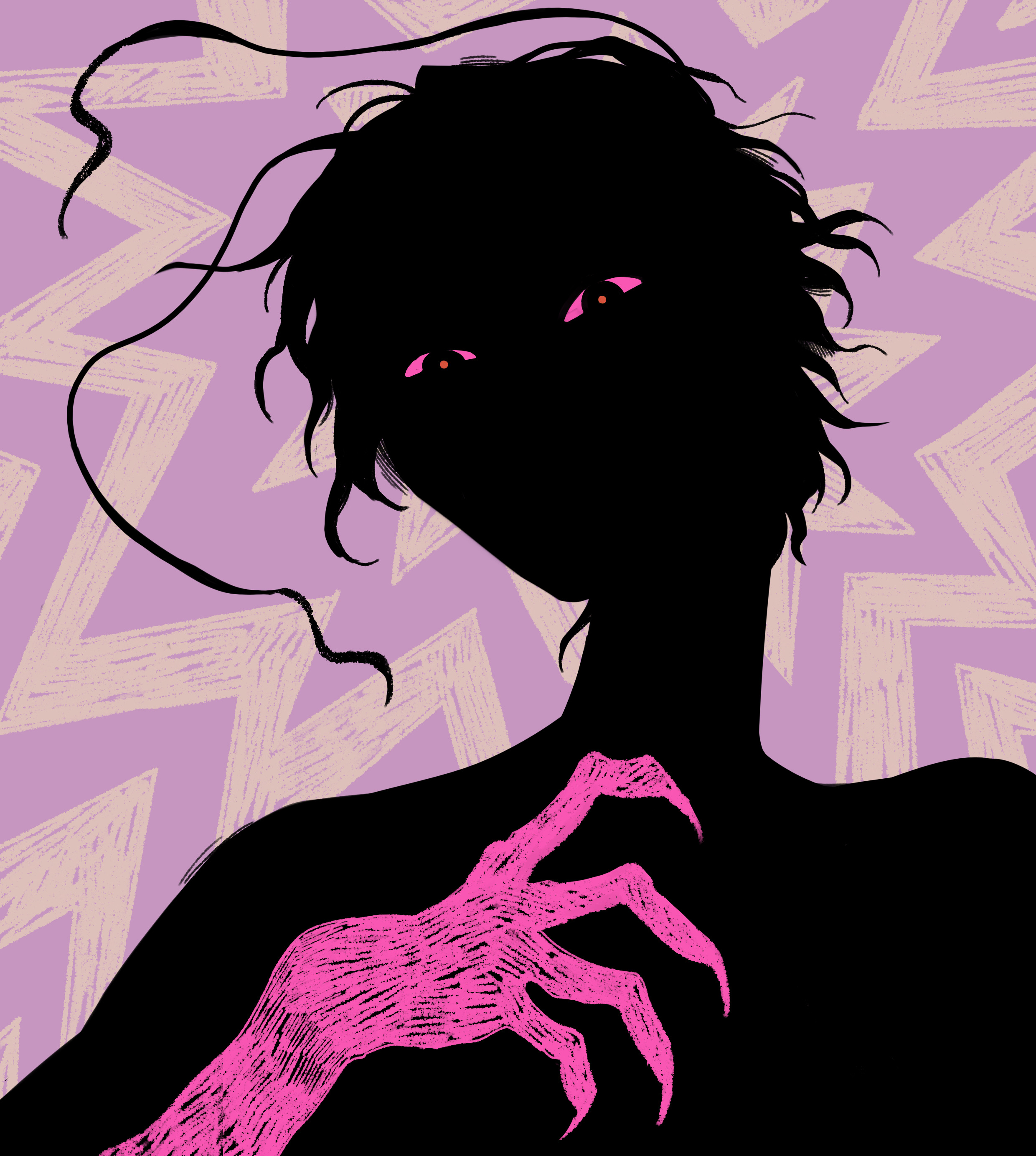
Illustration used by Porpentine as their portrait

Announced on January 29, 2016, Psycho Nymph Exile was commissioned by the not-for-profit arts organization Rhizome as part of their 2015–2016 series of commissions. It was presented in collaboration with the New Museum as an online exhibition. Originally released exclusively as an Ebook, Arcadia Missa published a print edition of the novella in December 2016, soon after the Ebook's release.

The work was a collaboration between several artists. Porpentine Charity Heartscape, wrote, conceptualized, and designed the work, Neotenomie designed the central eyeball motif and created the art, music, and code for the sub-work Probiotic River Therapy , and Sloane Leong created the novella's cover art. The eyeball symbol depicts the character Vellus' multi-iris eye. Psycho Nymph Exile comprises several works. The central novella is a nonlinear work composed of a series of vignettes and lengthy footnotes. It is divided by black-and-white eyeball illustrations, which Porpentine intended as a break point in order to create "a book that’s more legible for people with brain damage, so that it doesn’t have to be this punishing experience." The physical edition comes with two stickers of the eyeball symbol. Certain keywords from the novel can be entered into Girlshard Portal, a page on Porpentine's website, to unlock hypertext games that extend the book's narrative. Also on Porpentine's website are the hypertext poem Girlbeam and the computer graphics poem Probiotic River Therapy.

Porpentine was previously known for their video games created in the hypertext software Twine, such as Howling Dogs and With Those We Love Alive. Initially recognized in the niche field of independent game development, in the mid 2010s their work spread into the fine art world. The printed edition of Psycho Nymph Exile was their first physical book.

== Contents ==
=== Psycho Nymph Exile ===
The dimension of Psycho Nymph Exile is defended by GAIGA, (Note: GAIGA standing for Giant Armored Insane Guardian Axis) biological mecha which must bond with pilots or risk psychosis. They fight ANTI-GAIGA, (Note: ANTI standing for Antagonist Null Terror Inception) grotesque beings labeled as invaders from "false worlds". Many individuals suffer from a mysterious and stigmatized condition called DSTP, (Note: DSTP standing for Despair Syndrome with Temporal Purge) a condition leading to color-categorized effects, such as the leaking of a slimy fluid from orifices and growth of mold in the brain. DSTP destroys individuals' futures, distorts perception, and mutilates the body. The government encourages DSTP, as it is used to separate GAIGA battles from the rest of the world by creating duplicate dimensions. These dimensions are extremely entropic and decay with duplicate people still in them.

Vellus Satowary is a GAIGA pilot living a desirable life at the academy, when the academy's director orders an experimental neuro-amplifier be installed in Vellus' mecha. This addition destabilizes the mecha, but Vellus' concerns are ignored when brought up. During the following battle, Vellus' mecha catastrophically fails, and an ANTI-GAIGA rips out the mecha's guts and Vellus along with them, severely disfiguring her and leaving her with DSTP. While the institute feigns concern over her, prescribing her "river therapy" and three months of solitary confinement to heal, they distort the incident and expel her. Former friends in the academy turn on her and sexually assault her.

Vellus is moved to a decaying state-subsidized apartment. Her only companion is a Pink Rubber Animal, a headless creature with a sphincter for a neck used as a service animal, garbage disposal and sex toy. Several years later, Vellus bonds with the ex-magical girl Isidol Amberdice at a DSTP support group. Magical girls are born with a crystal that makes people hate them and causes them to be allergic to certain words. However, the resulting allergic reaction can be used to fight ANTI-GAIGAs, and magical girls are often employed by the academy. Isidol's crystal was stolen while she was sleeping, resulting in her DSTP. Their friendship eventually turns into a relationship and they move in together, though they insist to others that they're siblings. The two live marginally. Lacking formal employment, Vellus sells her urine to be packaged as if it was from a female celebrity, and Isidol does sex work, though she eventually gets a restaurant job where she is harassed by her supervisor. The two spend most of their time together, doing drugs and having sex. The novella concludes with the sentence "I wish there was a world for us".

Throughout Psycho Nymph Exile are assorted vignettes in the same setting not directly related to Vellus and Isidol.

=== Girlbeam ===
Girlbeam is an interactive poem, where lines highlighted in purple can be clicked to reveal new lines, modify and extend existing lines, or flash text up on screen. After being clicked, lines turn white and can no longer be interacted with.

=== Probiotic River Therapy ===
Probiotic River Therapy is a hypertext poem, with accompanying music and 3D visuals. Each section is one sentence long, with one or two links that advance the poem, and occasionally change the music and visuals. Different routes can be taken, though they all lead back to the original screen upon completion.

=== Girlshard Portal ===
Girlshard Portal contains a landing page with a text box to enter one of five keywords from the book. Entering a keyword will load a Twine game, consisting of a branching vignette that can be advanced by clicking on highlighted text. Embedded in the text are footnotes, which display a black page with lines of text and the eye symbol when clicked. Clicking the eye brings the player back to the page with the footnote.

== Reception and analysis ==
Psycho Nymph Exile received praise from critics for its abstract worldbuilding and personal, evocative style. Writing for Autostraddle, writer Kai Cheng Thom praised the work for its unique flair, and journalist Donna Kazimarki described it as "rich with eroticized slime and otherworldly grime". Thom additionally cited the books willingness to cover difficult sociopolitical dynamics and digital elements as highlights of Psycho Nymph Exile. However, she also critiqued the novella for being overly dense and difficult to understand without foreknowledge of anime and cyberpunk motif, and considered the central relationship to be underdeveloped.

Cosplay of Sailor Moon's title character, an inspiration for Psycho Nymph Exile

Much of Psycho Nymph Exile is focused on trauma and PTSD, especially CPTSD. The acronym for the in-universe condition DSTP, standing for Despair Syndrome with Temporal Purge, is the reverse of PTSD. Porpentine chose to depict DSTP as a physical, rather than psychological, condition in order to give legitimacy a mental condition people often claim isn't real, and depict how trauma can break down the barrier between mind and body. Psycho Nymph Exile also analyzes how communities, especially queer and radical communities can exploit those inside them. Kai Cheng Thom compares the abuse the character Vellus experiences at the hands of tight-knit communities to that which Porpentine described experiencing their essay Hot Allostatic Load.

While the term "transgender" is never used in Psycho Nymph Exile, the main character instead being described as a "hormone cyborg", and Porpentine refers to themself as "trashgender" rather than transgender, several commentators view Psycho Nymph Exile as a trans work. The horror author Gretchen Felker-Martin cited Psycho Nymph Exile as an example of the queer representation many people desire can be found in independent art, outside of corporate media. She views Vellus and Isidol's complex and often unpleasant lives, summarized by the book's concluding sentience, "I wish there was a world for us", as exemplary of the transgender experience.

Writing for The New School's Public Seminar, scholar McKenzie Wark also recognizes the details of the protagonists lives as reflecting a transgender life. She also views the central couple in Psycho Nymph Exile as possessing the unique traits trans for trans relationships have. Wark draws a connection between how the poor and trans are treated in the work, and the treatment of its nonhuman creatures such as the headless kink creatures Pink Rubber Animals, and the "tiny girls" used in crush videos. Kai Cheng Thom also focuses on how trans women are treated, drawing a link between how the main characters in the book are discarded by those around them, and the similar experience many have in our world.

Many of the work's concepts and conceits are drawn from mecha and magical girl anime, such as Neon Genesis Evangelion and Sailor Moon. Porpentine calls the setting "post-anime", using anime genres that focus on idealized young people to explore "what happens after the impossible-to-sustain emotion and love-bombing". Porpentine stated that they use genres like sci-fi to "encrypt" personal experiences in forms accessible to "your own people" which may be difficult to understand for others. Kai Cheng Thom argued that by limiting its accessibility with knowledge of anime genre tropes, Psycho Nymph Exile might push away those who would otherwise relate to the work. Many of Porpentine's inspirations are lowbrow pulp works, such as fan fiction, erotic literature, and video game dialogue.

The novella's complex and violent world filled with women has been compared to outsider artist Henry Darger's work In the Realms of the Unreal. McKenzie Wark also compares this setting to Monique Wittig's Les Guérillères, and the book's headless Pink Rubber Animals to the headless figure used by Georges Bataille's Acéphale.
