= Rat Chaos =

2012 video game

- Designer: Winter Lake
- Engine: Twine
- Platform: Browser
- Release: 2012
- Genres: Art game Electronic literature Interactive fiction
- Mode: Single-player

Rat Chaos is a 2012 stream of consciousness art and browser game created by Winter Lake.

== Plot ==
A spaceship captain chooses between going about their daily routine or "unleashing rat chaos."

== Development ==
While learning the software Twine, author Winter Lake made the game "in a couple hours" on July 18, 2012. Originally, the game was available via Winter Lake's website monster killers. The game disappeared for a number of years with copies only available on saved hard drives. Rock, Paper, Shotgun contributor Robert Yang made it available again on his personal website.

== Reception ==
"Whatever we may have got up to in other branches of this stream-of-consciousness Twine story, New Rat City knows we're not real space adventurers. He knows we're just sitting in front of a computer."

In 2012, IndieGames.com's Konstantinos Dimopoulos described Rat Chaos as "weird, sports a really odd use of the English language, will make you both laugh and wonder, features some interesting drawings and was created with Twine." Free Indie Games's Porpentine said it was "the funniest Twine game I've ever played, and the most human." Interactive fiction (IF) writer Emily Short critiqued it as "a very short Twine piece" that "plays with agency not in the usual ways [...] explores the idea of surface agency as a distraction."

In 2013, Rat Chaos character New Rat City won the XYZZY Award for Best Individual NPC in 2012. Jenni Polodna reviewed the character: "New Rat City is a personal statement. New Rat City is a tuning fork for all of our weird-kid mitochondria, which, if you squint, might or might not be covered in little rat faces trying to look normal. This might or might not be how you were able to unleash all that rat chaos." Comics & Gaming Magazine's Reid McCarter called it "a surrealist adventure."

In 2015, Gamasutra published a preview excerpt chapter, "Rat Chaos by Winter Lake", from the Merritt k-edited book Videogames for Humans. In Videogames for Humans, Rat Chaos was praised by one contributor: "I couldn't have asked for a better or more meaningful or more personally resonant piece to introduce me to Twine than Winter Lake's Rat Chaos."

In 2016, Rock, Paper, Shotgun staff ranked it 47th on their list "The 50 Best Free Games On PC" saying "[it's] as odd as a Twine game can get and just as funny, playing with language and mistyping in a way that evokes the weirdest of Weird Twitter."
