= ASMR (disambiguation) =

ASMR, or autonomous sensory meridian response, is phenomena of sensory perception.

ASMR may also refer to:

- "ASMR", a song by 21 Savage on the 2018 album I Am > I Was
- Khalid al-Asmr, a citizen of Jordan who was held in the Guantanamo Bay detention camp
- American Society of Mining and Reclamation, a professional society
- Aircraft surface movement radar, a radar used to detect aircraft and vehicles on the surface of an airport
- Accelerating seismic moment release, in earthquake prediction
- Age-specific mortality rate, or age-standardised mortality rate

== See also ==
- AMSR, or Advanced Microwave Scanning Radiometer
- (ASMR) Vin Diesel DMing a Game of D&D Just For You
