= Pry (novel) =

Work of electronic literature

- Author: Samantha Gorman, Danny Cannizzaro
- Language: English
- Genre: electronic literature
- Publisher: Tender Claws
- Publication date: 2014
- Publication place: United States
- Awards: New Media Writing Prize, The Robert Coover Award for a Work of Electronic Literature

Pry is a 2014 interactive digital novella for iPad created by Samantha Gorman and Daniel Cannizzaro, which follows an American ex-soldier named James after he returns home from the first Gulf War. The novella combines text, haptic gestures, audio, and video to convey James's struggles with issues such as PTSD and his worsening eyesight as he works as a demolition expert.

Pry has been influential in the field of electronic literature both because of its mainstream success and its innovative gestural mode of interaction, where readers for example "pry" open a character's eyes by pinching and dragging their fingers on the screen. The work has won several awards, is the subject of several scholarly publications and is taught at several universities.

== Gestural interface ==
The gestural modes of narrative interaction Gorman launched in the iPad novella Pry, co-authored with Danny Cannizzaro and released by the studio Tender Claws in 2014, have been analysed by scholars and reviewed in both literary and mainstream media including Vice and Wired. A review in the LA Review of Books opened by stating that "Everyone interested in the contemporary state or future of literature as a hybrid tactile mediated experience should experience Pry", although the reviewer also notes that the novelty of the interaction design eclipsed the narrative itself.

Digital poet John Cayley wrote that Pry "proclaims (..) that gestures will be an intimate and necessary aspect of the experience of reading, as reading changes for all of us." In an interview with Gorman for his book The Digital Imaginary, cinema studies scholar and director Roderick Coover describes Gorman as "making a case for new media offering a more complex form of authoring." In an interview after winning the 2014 New Media Writing Prize, Gorman argues against overemphasising technological newness, saying that despite Pry using "new tool sets, but it is still a very human story".

== Origins and influences ==
Many works and artists had already been using the various methods of storytelling and interactivity which were used in Pry. A work called Shadows Never Sleep, written by Aya Natalia KarpińSkansen in 2008, uses the pinch interaction method which was used in Pry. In KarpińSkansen’s work the pinch method was used to zoom into a static and monochrome grid of poems. While this usage of pinching requires the same method of interaction, it doesn’t provide the same story context that readers get from Pry. The pinch interaction has also been called a type of stretchtext, which is a hypertext feature introduced by Ted Nelson in 1970.

Another story creator who used interaction methods similar to Pry is John Cayley. Many of Cayley’s works used text-within-text and word replacements methods to morph texts. Judd Morrissey, author of The Jew’s Daughter (2000), “used rollovers to replace sentences and words within paragraphs; his text transformed as it was touched.” These interaction forms, which originated within various works, have been repurposed into the story of Pry to create a new experience.

== Publication history ==
Pry was released to the public in the form of an iOS app in 2014. The creators decided to create the project on iOS software because its advanced software and haptics provided a far greater level of user interaction. The pair used many complex methods of interaction which were, at the time, exclusively available with Apple software, to create a layered experience that pushed readers to explore and uncover plot points hidden under various methods of interaction.

== Plot ==
Pry begins by following a man named James who is wandering around his house gathering things as he prepares to leave for the military. After the prologue video readers jump to the future where James and Luke now work at a demolition company. While James is going about his life, readers are given various methods of interaction which provide hidden context about James' past and the challenges he is currently facing. Through these methods of interacting readers learn about James' experience in the military and about a woman named Jessie, who both James and Luke were close with. By exploring the digital elements readers will learn about the relationship between Luke and Jessie and how it impacted James, who had feelings for her the whole time. This dynamic and the aftereffects of it play a major role in the story and the mental struggles that readers see James struggle with. Pry is a story which starts out ambiguous but unravels itself as readers play along and explore using the digital elements.

== Story structure and navigation ==
The story follows James, an ex-soldier, who has returned home from the first Gulf War. Now back home, he struggles with PTSD as he begins to lose his eyesight. Readers follow along with James as he struggles through life and, through various methods of interacting, are able the to explore his mind, the world around him, and fragments of his memories. Through exploring these methods of interaction, readers can uncover hidden narratives and plot points.

Navigation utilizes many different interaction methods which further the story. The methods used are pinching and pulling the screen to show different visuals and sounds, pulling apart text to reveal new hidden text, and scrolling through an endless screen of words and images. Readers can check how much of the story they have explored with the built-in system in the table of contents. In the table of contents there are a number of diamonds linked to each chapter which reflect how much of that chapter readers have explored. Readers don’t have to unlock all the diamonds to understand the story, but exploring more will bring new information into light.

== Awards ==
Pry won the Electronic Literature Organization's award for best creative work in 2015 and the New Media Writing Prize in 2014, and was listed as one of Apple's 25 best apps of 2015. The work also received second place for the Future of Storytelling Award in 2014. John Cayley also commented on the various methods of interaction utilized and how the work fits into the changing world of literature.

== Critical reception ==
Pry has been influential in the fields of electronic literature and digital narrative due to its use of gestural interactions as story-bearing elements in a work of digital narrative, and its mainstream success. Writing for The Cambridge Companion to Twenty-First Century American Fiction, Scott Rettberg explains that the "reader's interaction with Pry is primarily about reaching into the protagonist's mind to access his thoughts and emotions. Physical gestures serve as metaphors as well as ways to traverse the text". As Janeen Naji writes, "the haptic gestures of tap, swipe and pinch are also imbued with meaning". The work has been taught at at least five universities.

Yolanda De Gregorio Robledo explains his process as she answers the question, can e-lit be analyzed similarly to how other literatures are analyzed? In her article, she explores the first chapter of Pry and documents her process as she determines the answer to her question. Although the work received many awards, there were also many who critiqued the work for depending too heavily on interactive elements to carry the story. Pry was critiqued for prioritizing the exploration of digital elements, rather than the exploration of the actual story. A review from the Los Angeles Review of Books states, "I was engaged and intrigued and led inexorably on, but more by curiosity and wonder at the transitions and forms than by suspense or need for resolution of the content."
