= Merritt K =

Canadian writer and video game designer

merritt k
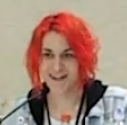
- Born: October 1 Hamilton, Ontario, Canada
- Other name: Merritt Kopas
- Occupations: Writer; editor; game designer
- Website: otherstrangeness.com

merritt k, formerly Merritt Kopas, is a Canadian writer, editor, and video game designer.

k is known for her games LIM, HUGPUNX, and Consensual Torture Simulator. Much of her early work is no longer available, k said those works "felt personal in a way that I was uncomfortable with", and that post-Gamergate, "being personal online was a much more dangerous proposition...for a lot of people."

k is the author of Internet fiction and zines such as Dear Pauline and These Were Free on my Blog. k is the editor of the Twine game print anthology Videogames for Humans and co-author of the poetry collection Total Mood Killer and the comics-poetry hybrid text Internet Murder Revenge Fantasy. In 2024, she published LAN Party, a photo book revisiting the early 2000s heyday of the LAN party. From 2019 to 2023, she was an editor at Fanbyte.

== Career ==
k grew up with games and the Choose Your Own Adventure book series, though her academic background was in sociology. Her first game to attract wider attention was LIM, released on her website for free in 2012. LIM was made in Construct 2, and is a maze game about navigating public spaces and the perception of others. It was made during her first summer publicly presenting as a queer woman, and was an expression of that experience.

Also in 2012, she discovered the interactive fiction tool Twine. Though Twine was first released in 2009, k credits Anna Anthropy's 2012 work, Rise of the Videogame Zinesters, for bringing it to a wider audience. k authored works using Twine, and was grouped into a 'queer games scene' which featured other trans women creatives such as Anthropy, Mattie Brice, and Porpentine, the presence of which lead k to declare in Lambda Literary that "hypertext and digital games are totally trans genres". In 2015, k published Videogames for Humans, a collection of conversations between Twine authors and critics.

On her personal website, k has published such games as Minkomora, Obeissance, and Take Care – the last one described as a game in which the player reaches through the ether to offer comfort to a distressed person. Some of her smaller pieces, such as the game Super Consent, deal with the complexities of issues like consent and why and how they should be dealt with in culture. In September 2016, the NYU Game Center announced k as its first-ever artist in residence.

(ASMR) Vin Diesel DMing a Game of D&D Just For You was designed by k in 2015. The Twine game features American actor Vin Diesel providing a "quick game" of the fantasy tabletop role-playing game Dungeons & Dragons to help the player feel better about themselves. The game involves pictures of the actor as well as text introducing the game to the player. The autonomous sensory meridian response (ASMR) aspect of the game is in the gameplay rather than as audio.

k hosted her own podcast called Woodland Secrets, where she interviewed primarily women, people of color, and queer people. On June 19, 2016, she began hosting Dadfeelings, a podcast about fictional dads and the feelings associated with them. k also guest starred on the Polygon podcast CoolGames Inc. for an episode.

== Games ==
- LIM – August 2012
- Consensual Torture Simulator – October 2013
