= Ultra Business Tycoon III =

- The faux .nfo file that accompanied the release
- Developer: Porpentine Charity Heartscape
- Writer: Porpentine Charity Heartscape
- Engine: Twine
- Platform: Browser
- Release: 2013
- Genre: Interactive fiction

Ultra Business Tycoon III is a 2013 Twine game by Porpentine Charity Heartscape. While it is initially presented as a satire of capitalism through the 1990s tycoon games that promoted them, as the game progresses it increasingly reveals a story within a story about a girl playing Ultra Business Tycoon III to escape a bad home life. The game was developed over several years by Porpentine, inspired by their own life and experience playing video games as a child. The game had a mixed popular reception upon release, but was praised by video game critics for its humor and moving story. English scholar James J. Brown Jr. viewed the game as an example of games disempowering players by distorting and removing options, which he blamed for its mixed popular reception.

== Contents ==
Ultra Business Tycoon III is framed as a 1990s edutainment game, with the goal of acquiring 1,000,000 dollars. The game opens with a retro UI, containing options to save, load, read the guide, read the credits, or quit. Only one game is saved, and attempting to load it produces the narration "Your big sister’s save file. Best not to fuck with it." During certain moments in Ultra Business Tycoon III, these italicized lines of text appear addressing an in-universe character playing the game, a young girl in a bad home. While sometimes framed as the player going to do something, other lines such as "You don’t know why they started hitting you. It just happened" without any context given. Late in the game, the girl's older sister enters and gives her a goodbye, after which the player can only turn back to the game. The game ends with drawings made Porpentine's younger sister, which she received several years after running away from home.

== Creation and release ==
Porpentine began work on Ultra Business Tycoon III several years before its release, inspired by the work of thecatamites. When Porpentine restarted development they made it much more personal, introducing a meta and semi-autobiographical layer of the girl playing the game. Both the girl and her sister have elements of Porptentine, as they did not want to make their actual sister a prop. The ending was added only hours before the game's release, when her sister send her some pictures and Porpenine asked to use them. Many elements of Ultra Business Tycoon III were inspired by composites of Porpentine's memories, such as trying to get around impassible barriers in Exile games or crack all of the protections on a shareware disk. They also drew from Kat Lake's essay Phantom Games, which argues that the nostalgia of childhood video games in inextricably tied to what was occurring in a person's life when they were playing it. Like many of their games, it was created in the Twine engine. It was their largest Twine game to that point.

Upon release in 2013, Ultra Business Tycoon III was framed by Porpentine as an edutainment game game that they had finished cracking, even including a .nfo file that would have been used by old cracks to bypass shareware restrictions.

Ultra Business Tycoon III was one of the twenty-five games included in Porpentine's 2015 collection Eczema Angel Orifice.

== Reception and analysis ==
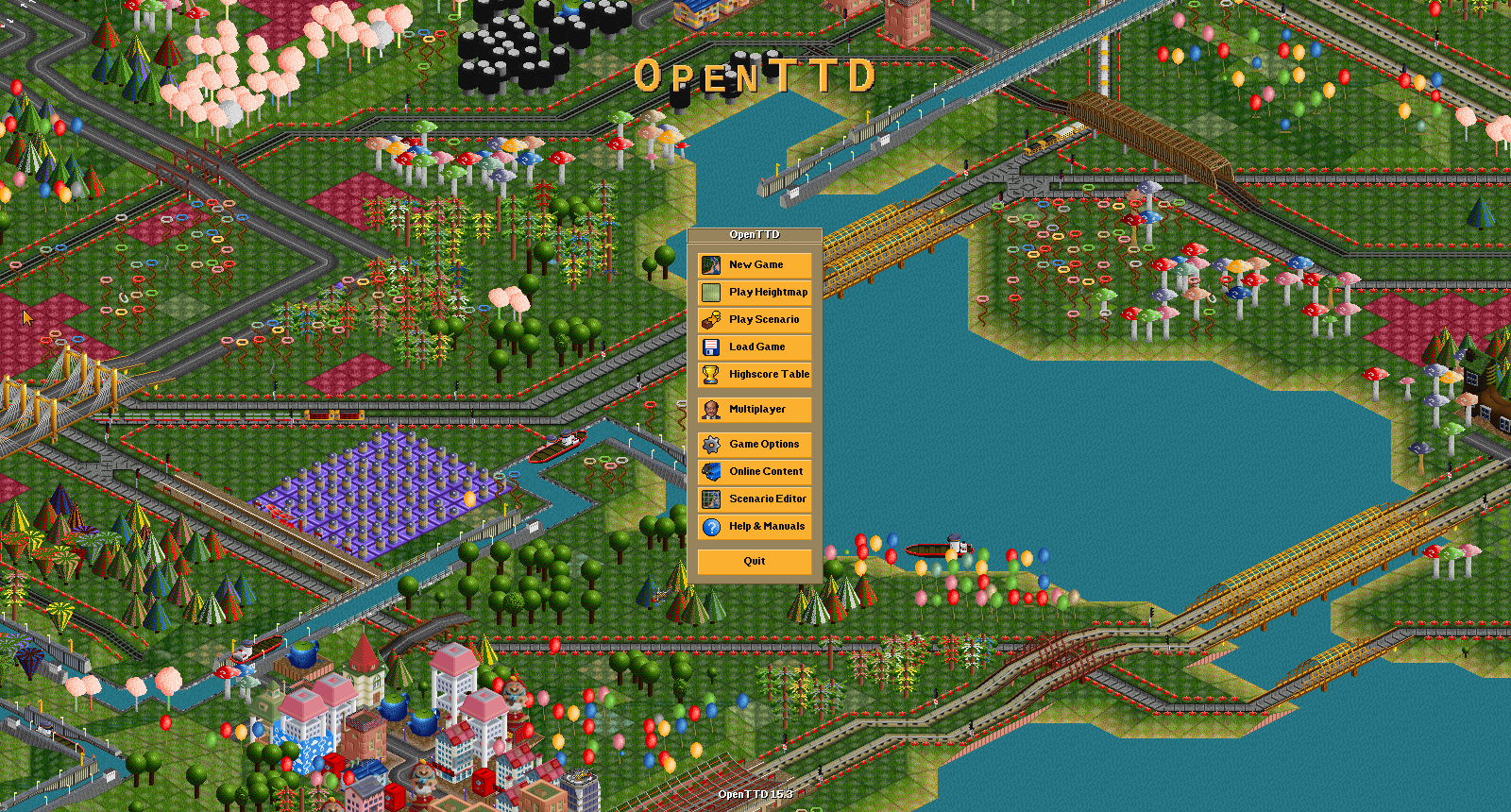
Ultra Business Tycoon III parodies tycoon games such as OpenTTD

Ultra Business Tycoon III met a mixed popular reception, but was positively received by video game critics. Critics Patrick Klepek and Cara Ellison found the work both funny and moving, Ellison describing it as speaking to "The smaller ones inside us". Fellow game designer Emily Short said it landed in the space between works that overly pander to the audience, and works that are so author focused that they are uninterpretable to the audience.

Ultra Business Tycoon III contains an extremely exaggerated satire of capitalism and tycoon games, which was originally the core of the game before Porpentine restarted development. Emily Short believes that the choice of tycoon games was because they are a genre that already exaggerates and venerates capitalism. She cites a mission in the game where you are asked to destroy "PorpCo", and obvious analogue to Porpentine themself. English scholar James J. Brown Jr. says that the absurd nature of capitalism in Ultra Business Tycoon III's world is not that different from the simulations in genuine tycoon games such as Railroad Tycoon. However, he finds the game's discussion of this theme as secondary to the rest of the work.

James J. Brown views the game as an example of how games can distort the cognitive mapping of user interfaces. In his 2014 presentation to the Society for Literature, Science, and the Arts, Brown argues that Ultra Business Tycoon III subverts the traditional control players have over their character by removing the clear links between the player's input and what happens as a result. By removing and distorting choices, the game reflects the grounded experience of the depressed and abused young protagonist, who does not have the control that a video game character has. Brown blamed the game's distortion as the reason for its mixed popular reception, as he thought many gamers could not break out of the mindset that they were supposed to be heros.
