= Aidan Strong =

Digital artist

- Education: University of California Los Angeles
- Website: aidanstrong.info

Aidan Strong (he/they) is an artist known for interactive digital media artwork and game collages.

Strong is the creator of TEXTURETOWN, a massively multiplayer online game created from assets from early 2000s online children's games.

Their work Revisiting was shortlisted for the Chris Meade Memorial Main Prize in 2024 by the New Media Writing Prize.

== Works ==
- TEXTURETOWN
- Revisiting
