= The Uncle Who Works for Nintendo =

2014 video game

- Developer: Michael Lutz
- Artist: Kimberly Parker
- Writer: Michael Lutz
- Engine: Twine
- Platform: Browser
- Release: October 15, 2014
- Genres: Interactive fiction, horror

The Uncle Who Works for Nintendo is a horror-themed interactive fiction video game, developed by Michael Lutz and released via browser on October 15, 2014.

The game's title is inspired by a false playground claim stereotypically used by children to spread video game-related rumors and urban legends.

== Plot ==
The Uncle Who Works for Nintendo is set around the late 1990s and casts the player in the role of an 11-year-old staying overnight at an – apparently wealthy – friend's house. Both the friend and player character enjoy video games, and the friend (whose name can be selected from a list) has a large selection of them, including strange and unreleased systems. This is explained by the friend having an "uncle who works for Nintendo".

The friend takes a Nintendo 64 to a small den outside the house proper, where the pair are staying during the night. Dialogue choices enable the player to learn more about the backstory and relationship between the two characters. The friend's parents will eventually tell the pair that the friend's uncle will be arriving on a visit at midnight. Various interaction options will gradually advance the in-game clock until it reaches midnight. Following certain dialogue options will gradually reveal certain discrepancies and peculiarities related to the friend's statements and backstory, with the protagonist remembering things the friend claims to have no memory of.

Thinking about the friend's uncle will reveal a memory where the protagonist first heard about the uncle – they had brought their Game Boy to school, showing off that they had caught an abnormally powerful Mew in Pokémon Red and Blue, which no-one else at school had managed to achieve. Upon being asked how they got it, they claimed that their uncle had got a job at Nintendo.

The game has a total of six possible endings, five of which are initially available, and one which requires the completion of the fifth ending. The first two involve the clock reaching midnight, and the "uncle", who appears to be an eldritch entity, arriving and "consuming" the protagonist, as it needs to be "fed" periodically. This is textually depicted using fake computer code and interference with the game's interface. Some dialogue options unlock the option to phone home and ask for the protagonist's mother to take them home early, which lead to endings three to five. The third one, where the friend "moves away" and is never heard from again, is triggered if this happens while the player has not learnt of the true nature of the friend's "uncle". The fourth and fifth are mostly identical, with the friend apparently dying in a fire after the protagonist leaves. The player is then given the option of taking their Game Boy from the site of the fire days later. Leaving the Game Boy triggers the fourth ending, where the protagonist simply returns home. Taking the Game Boy will result in the protagonist's "parents" (who are implied to be replaced by the entity) informing them that "their uncle has a new job at Nintendo".

The final ending, available after completing all others, requires the player to flee to the kitchen when the "uncle" arrives, an option that is otherwise unavailable due to the entity's influence. Here, the protagonist will pull their friend's Game Boy from their pocket, obtained in ending five. Through interacting with a mock-up "pause menu", it's revealed that the Game Boy is itself directly tied to the "uncle", which offers itself to people promising games, strategies and consoles in exchange for periodic "feeding". By selecting a "fast" text speed option, the game "restarts", automatically speeding through the introduction of the script. The protagonist reveals to the friend that they know about the "uncle" and used it to "come back here", implying they have awareness of previous playthroughs of the game. The entity is described as being "starved", weakening its influence, and its previous victims are implied to still exist, and are capable of being saved through the protagonist's actions. The protagonist takes the friend's hand, as they "exit" the pause menu, killing off the entity. A lengthy garbled text is displayed, which can be partially deciphered by clicking on certain hyperlinked fragments, revealing a semi-coherent speech regarding a personal sense of identity and self-worth being derived via gaming. After a few seconds, the text abruptly disappears, before the protagonist comments to the friend on the strength of their friendship triumphing in the entity's attempt to divide them, marking the ultimate end of the story.

== Development ==
Michael Lutz began writing The Uncle Who Works for Nintendo at the beginning of August 2014, following the release of his previous work My Father's Long, Long Legs in 2013. Compared to his previous work, he aimed to focus on creating a work that was comparatively more open-ended. He described his goal as "a horror game that, if it is in the least bit scary when you first play it, manages to get less frightening each subsequent time".

During his work on the project, the Gamergate harassment campaign began. In a short piece entitled "On Topicality", written as part of the in-game author's notes, he describes the events as having given the themes of the game a relevance they wouldn't otherwise have, stating that "the contingent of players taking up the flag of "gamers" are, in many ways, the realization of the thoughts, feelings, and behaviors that constitute the "enemy" of this game".

== Reception ==
The title received attention from numerous outlets upon its initial release.

In an article on October 2014 freeware releases, Adventure Gamers described the game as "undoubtedly horror of the creepypasta variety". The article praised the final ending as "providing a profoundly satisfying conclusion to the tale". The site later featured the game as representing October 2014 in a month-by-month retrospective on freeware games covered by the site.

Kill Screen provided a more critical review, rating the game 70/100 and commenting that "A single playthrough is worth it. But beyond that, [..] TUWWFN becomes tedious".

Polygon commented on how the game's dialogue is affected if the player selects a feminine name for the protagonist's friend. This was further expounded upon in a piece by interactive fiction writer Emily Short, describing the friend's relationship with the uncle as "a Faustian bargain in which games promise them power and financial success and an alpha lifestyle, in exchange for the destruction of all their friends", and referencing the author's notes discussing the work in relation to Gamergate. However, she described the final ending as a "diminishing of the story’s emotional potency", arguing that the parable provided a simplistic response to complex real world cultural issues. Ultimately though, she described it as "a memorable [and] effective piece overall".

The work won the 2014 XYZZY Award for "Best Individual PC" (player character).
