= Stretchtext =

Hypertext feature

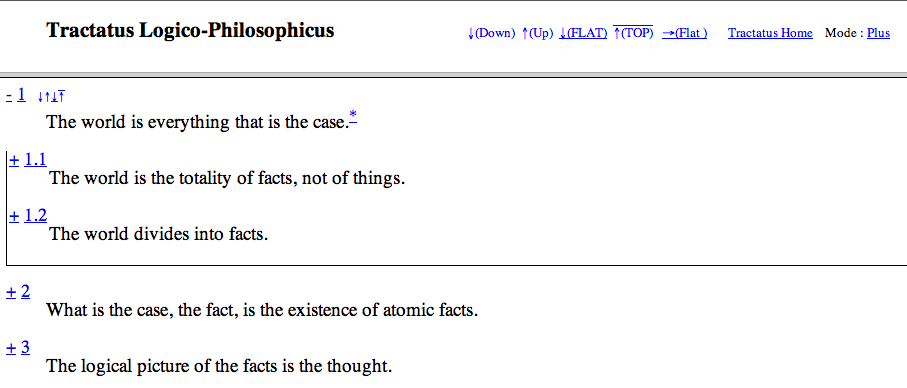
A demo of StretchText listing the propositions of Ludwig Wittgenstein's Tractatus Logico-Philosophicus, with Wittgenstein's further commentary on the propositions being revealed

Stretchtext (also called StretchText, stretchtext, stretch-text) is a hypertext feature that allows the reader to expand the text to show more detail. The term was defined in 1970 by Ted Nelson as a genre of hypertext, although he had described it in unpublished materials as early as 1967.

Stretchtext has not gained mass adoption in systems like the World Wide Web, but has remained a topic of study in hypertext and hypermedia research, and has also been used to literary and poetic effect in electronic literature and interactive cinema.

== Ted Nelson's 1970 definition ==
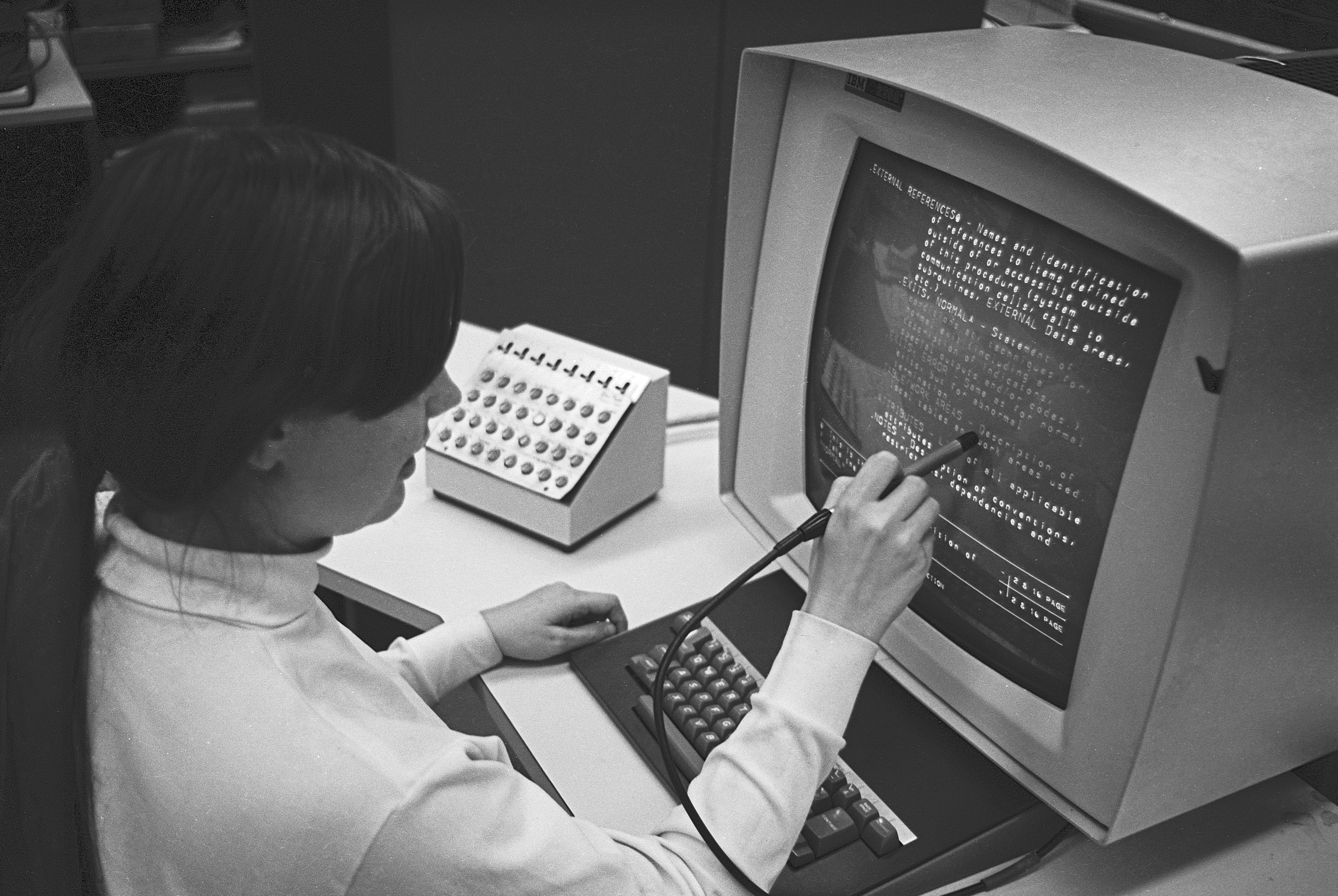
In 1970, interfaces for computers were not yet standardized, so Nelson's suggestion of using throttles to navigate text was less surprising than today. This photo shows a reader using a light pen to edit hypertext in 1969.

Ted Nelson coined the term in an article he published in Computer Decisions in September 1970. The article argued that computer assisted instruction would be better than traditional learning in schools because it would allow people to learn according to interest. He presented hypertext, a term he coined in 1965, as the best way of organizing this, and presented several different types of hypertext. Stretchtext is one of these.

Nelson imagined a screen with two throttles that the reader would use to control the text. One throttle would move forwards and backwards in the text. The other would expand sections the reader was particularly interested in. He presented the following short text as an example:

Stretchtext is a form of writing. It is read from a screen. The user controls it with throttles. It gets longer and shorter on demand.

Nelson offers this text to demonstrate how the above might be expanded to provide more detail for a curious reader:

Stretchtext, a kind of hypertext, is basically a form of writing closely related to other prose. It is read by a user or student from a computer display screen. The user, or student, controls it, and causes it to change, with throttles connected to the computer. Stretchtext gets longer, by adding words and phrases, or shorter, by subtracting words and phrases, on demand.

The idea has also been developed to work with other media than text alone, for example as stretchfilm.

Conceptually, StretchText is similar to existing hypertexts system where a link provides a more descriptive or exhaustive explanation of something, but there is a key difference between a link and a piece of StretchText. A link completely replaces the current piece of hypertext with the destination, whereas StretchText expands or contracts the content in place. Thus, the existing hypertext serves as context.

== Usage in electronic literature ==
Stretchtext has been used in works of electronic literature including Pry, a novella written to be read on an iPad, Stuart Moulthrop's Victory Garden (1991) and Judd Morrisey's The Jew's Daughter (1998), which Mark Bernstein has called "perhaps the most artistically successful stretchtext fiction".
