= Loss of Grasp =

Work of electronic literature

- Author: Serge Bouchardon, Vincent Volckaert
- Language: French, English
- Genre: electronic literature
- Publication date: 2011
- Awards: New Media Writing Prize

Loss of Grasp (Déprise in the French) is an online interactive digital narrative by Serge Bouchardon and Vincent Volckaert. It was first published in 2010. Loss of Grasp won the New Media Writing Prize in 2011, and has been analyzed in several scholarly works.

Serge Bouchardon is an author and professor at the University of Technology of Compiègne in France. The work was included in the ELMCIP Anthology of European Electronic Literature, where the editors write that "Loss of Grasp, in French Déprise and in Italian Perdersi, plays with its readers’ expectations of how electronic texts are read." The New Media Writing Prize noted this work for its " ability to give the reader that sense of losing control as events unfold."

== Work description ==
Six separate scenes feature a character who is losing grasp. At the same time, this play on grasp and loss of grasp mirrors the readers’ experience of an interactive digital work. The reader moves the mouse to uncover texts.

For instance, in the second scene, the narrator is reading an ambiguous note from his wife. He speaks plainly about his loss of control. The readers can read the text either as a “love poem or a breakup note”. The reader can experience this double interpretation with gestures. If the readers move the mouse cursor to the top, the text will unfold as a love poem; but if the cursor is moved to the bottom, the order of the lines is reversed and the text turns into a breakup note. In the sixth and final scene, the narrator is determined to regain control. A text input window is then proposed to the readers wherein they can write. But whichever key the readers press, they do not control the text displayed on the screen. The readers are thus facing a manipulation based on a difference between their expectations and the display on the screen. The readers experience interactively the feeling of loss of grasp of the character. In this interactive narrative, the gestures fully contribute to the construction of meaning.

This approach to interactivity is based on the figures of gestural manipulation as defined by Serge Bouchardon himself.

== Anthologies, presentations, and performances ==
This piece has been the subject of numerous selections, presentations and performances, for example:

- European Literature Communities (Bergen, Norway, Sep. 2010)
- Repurposing in Electronic Literature (Kosice, Slovakia, Nov. 2013)
- Escenarios de la literatura electrónica (Mexico, Oct. 2015)
- Hyperrhiz 15 (Fall 2016)
- ICIDS Exhibition (Bournemouth, UK, 2020)
- I love E-Poetry
- Répertoire NT2

The piece has been anthologized in the ELMCIP Anthology of European Electronic Literature (2013), and the Electronic Literature Collection Volume 4 (2022) from the Electronic Literature Organization. It is cataloged in the ELMCIP Knowledge Base and the Electronic Literature Directory.

== Scholarly reception and analysis ==
Davin Heckman, associate professor of mass communication at Winona State University. He is managing editor of the Electronic Book Review and member of the board of the Electronic Literature Organization analyzed this work in his article Technics and Violence in Electronic Literature.

Steve Hummer in Necessary Fiction, explains how the digital elements of this piece illustrate the everyday engagement with our modern digital devices.

It has been taught at universities as an example of electronic literature. The work is being taught for Digital Literature in French secondary schools and included in the curricula for the open education resource from the Digital Arts and Culture.

== Publication, translations, and versions ==
An initial version was developed in Flash in 2010, then a new version was recreated in HTML/JavaScript in 2018 and a smartphone application in 2019.

The piece exists in 12 different languages: “Déprise” (French) / “Loss of Grasp” (English) / “Perdersi” (Italian) / “Perderse” (Spanish) / “Perda de controlo” (Portuguese) / Griffverlust (German) / (Nie)panowanie (Polish) / Fogásvesztés (Hungarian) / فقدان السيطرة (Arabic) / 失控 (Chinese) / утрата контроля (Russian) / अस्तित्व की ढलान (Hindi).

== Awards ==
- New Media Writing Prize (2011)
- Public Library Prize for Electronic Literature, shortlist (2019)
- Runner up for the Robert Coover Award for a Work of Electronic Literature (2020)
