= C ya laterrrr =

2017 autobiographical hypertext fiction by Dan Hett

c ya laterrrr
- Developer: Dan Hett
- Engine: Twine
- Platform: Browser
- Release: 2017
- Genres: Hypertext fiction, Electronic literature, Interactive fiction

c ya laterrrr is an autobiographical hypertext fiction written by Dan Hett about his experiences following his brother dying in the Manchester Arena bombing. It won the New Media Writing Prize in 2020.

== Plot and structure ==
c ya laterrrr is a text-only game or hypertext fiction written in Twine. The story is written in the second person, following the convention of interactive fiction. While the game has only one endpoint, the player is faced with many choices along the way and "one of the many possible pathways does reflect [Hett's] actual experience". Unlike many other Twine games, it doesn't feature back/next buttons, forcing the player to stick with the choices they make. Hett has emphasised the importance of these choices in interviews, saying that c ya laterrrr is "as much about what I didn't do as what I did do".

The game begins with the player as a parent in a quiet house, after their children are asleep, who sees social media posts speculating about something happening in the city. When they check their phone the next morning, they have received hundreds of messages overnight from people trying to contact them about their brother, and they learn the event in the city was a bombing at the concert their brother was attending.

Your eyes are starting to get tired, which you take as a signal to put the thing down and get some sleep. You're thinking about it, when you notice a sudden flurry of activity on social media about something going on in the city. A bang, an accident maybe. No details, no actual news, just busybodies speculating. Every time. It was like this during the riots a few years ago, you remember arguing a lot with people about it.

— Dan Hett, c ya laterrrr

== Reception ==
Keza MacDonald, writing in The Guardian, said c ya laterrrr's "intimacy comes from its interactivity". Gabrielle de la Puente described the writing as "hard and sober and it captured the very strange lucidity that comes with waking grief".

The work won the New Media Writing Prize in 2020 and was part of the "Digital Storytelling" exhibition at the British Library in 2023. Hett has written two other works about his grief at the loss of his brother, including The Loss Levels.

Publicity around c ya laterrrr resulted in apologies to Hett from some of the reporters who approached him so soon after the tragedy.

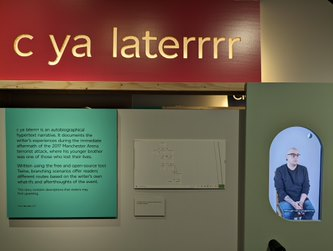
c ya laterrrr by Dan Hett, exhibit at the British Library 2023
