= You Are Jeff Bezos =

2018 video game

- Developer: Kris Lorischild
- Writer: Kris Lorischild
- Engine: Twine
- Platform: Browser
- Release: October 20, 2018
- Genre: Text adventure

You Are Jeff Bezos is a satirical text adventure game, developed and released in 2018 by indie developer and writer Kris Lorischild, then known as Kris Ligman. The game's premise involves the player waking up one morning as Amazon founder Jeff Bezos, and being tasked with spending his entire US$156 billion fortune.

== Plot ==
The game opens with the player character awaking from "unsettling dreams", only to notice that they have transformed into "a monstrous vermin" – Jeff Bezos. The game then claims that spending all of Bezos' money may allow the player to return to their real body and identity, as spending all his money would "disintegrate his physical form". The player is then given a variety of options of things to spend Bezos' money on, such as repairing Puerto Rico from Hurricane Maria, paying for the Mexico–United States border wall and then not building it, doubling the salary of every Amazon employee and ending homelessness in the United States. As options are completed, various text appears describing reactions to the player's actions, including praise, confusion and concern from fellow billionaires. Eventually, the player is accosted and tied up by bodyguards and members of Bezos' extended family, before escaping and continuing to spend his fortune. The game contains multiple different endings, including some hidden ones based on options that can only be triggered under specific circumstances.

== Development ==
Lorischild wrote You Are Jeff Bezos using Twine over the course of four days. They described it as "[starting] as a joke, and it probably should've remained that way, but people made the mistake of encouraging me" and as "a power fantasy which takes massive real-life social problems and reduces them to a few round numbers", that they hoped a small number of people may briefly enjoy. In response to people's perception of the political slant of the game, they stated that they "don't really consider the game socialist [...] anti-capitalist, maybe, in a vague and incoherent way".

== Reception ==
Following its release in October 2018, You Are Jeff Bezos became a viral hit, and was subject to coverage from media such as Vice and Newsweek, the latter of which described it as "critiquing the entire concept of billionaires". GeekWire stated that "if your financial decisions are based on working with a lot less money [...] being Jeff Bezos for a minute is certainly eye opening". Writing for Fanbyte, John Warren recommended the game, describing it as "funny and honest" and noting that "my 10-minute playthrough showed off plenty of Ligman's barbed commentary". The game was listed as one of "The Weirdest Video Games Of 2018" by Junkee.

Paste described the game as "a piece of advocacy—but it's not too dry or serious". The Outline stated that "maybe the most 'fun' part of the game is not literally spending Jeff Bezos's money, but remembering that he is only one of many, many newly minted, appallingly wealthy Silicon Valley tycoons". While discussing the game's popularity, Lorischild said that "I think it speaks to how frustrated people are that the game exploded the way it did", and that "on some level most of us recognize that money is a shitty game we never asked to be opted into, and for as long as most of the world plays it, it's nearly impossible for any of us to opt out".
