= Dan Hett =

English artist

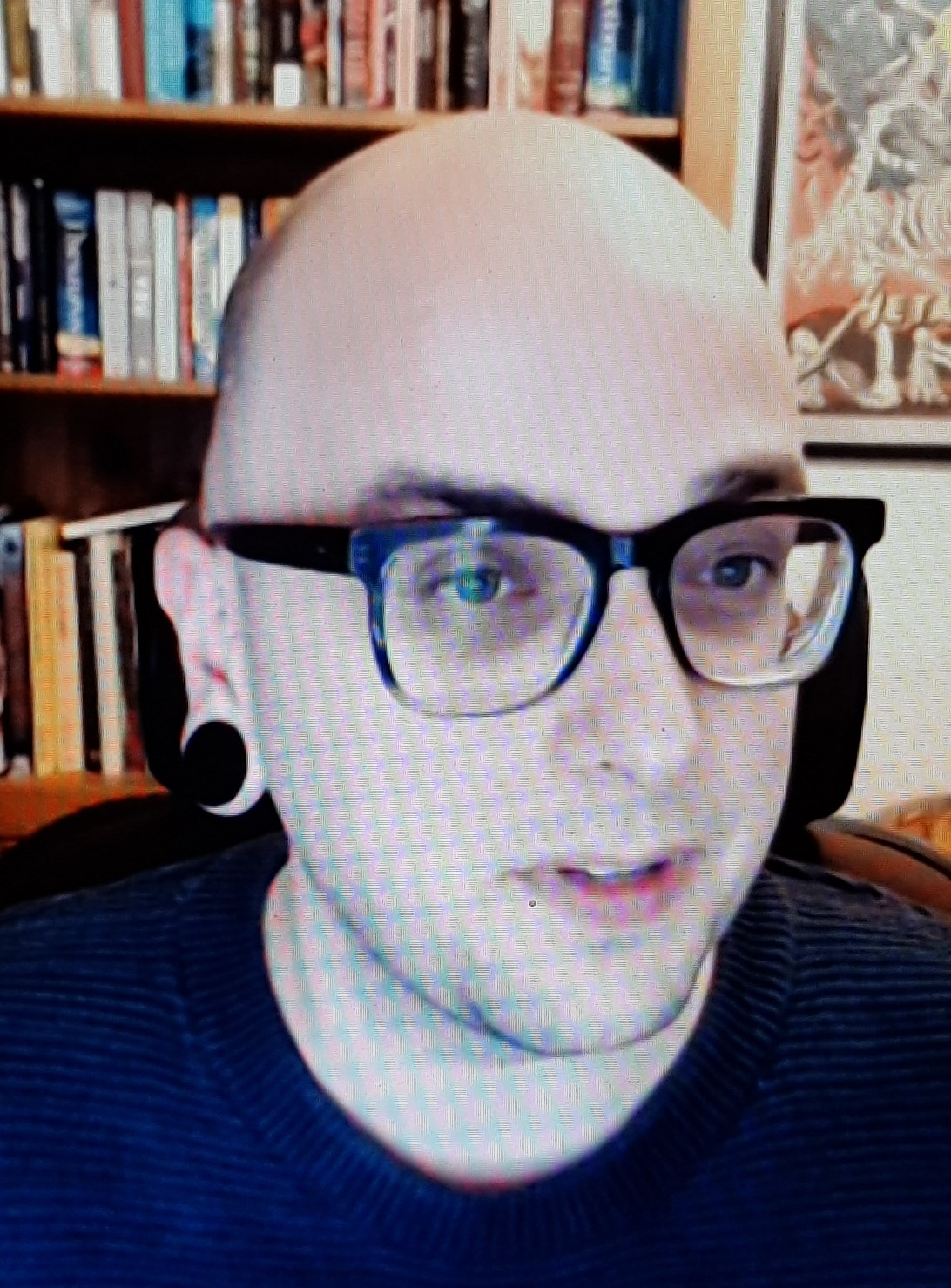
- Hett speaking at an online event in 2022.
- Occupations: digital artist and writer
- Website: danhett.com

Dan Hett is a digital artist, writer and games designer from Manchester, U.K. He is also a member of the Algorave live coding electronic music and visuals movement, performing under the name Rituals.

== Career ==
Hett's writing is influenced by the death of his younger brother Martyn Hett at the 2017 Manchester Arena bombing. He wrote a trilogy of games about the experience: c ya laterrrr, The Loss Levels and Sorry to Bother You. Hett is known for short introspective autobiographical narrative games and interactive fiction, which explore radicalisation, extremism and identity politics in the U.K. His work The Loss Levels has been exhibited at Now Play This festival in London and Sheffield DocFest.

Until 2016 Hett worked in the BBC Children's and R&D departments, where he developed apps and digital games across a range of languages and platforms. He was technical lead on the CBeebies Storytime app, and also designed and built the core of the BBC's first cross-platform multiplayer games API.

He founded a small independent games studio called PASSENGER GAMES in 2018, which produced the game Closed Hands.

In 2021 Hett became Creative Technologist at the School of Digital Arts, Manchester Metropolitan University.

== Awards ==
- 2015 Broadcast Digital Awards Winner of Best Digital Children's Content for CBeebies Storytime
- 2015 British Academy of Film and Television Arts Winner of Children's Interactive award for The Dumping Ground
- 2020 New Media Writing Prize winner for c ya laterrrr

== Works ==
=== Interactive Fiction ===
- c ya laterrrr, 2017
- The Loss Levels, 2018
- Sorry To Bother You, 2018
- Closed Hands, 2021
