= Samantha Gorman =

American writer and narrative game designer

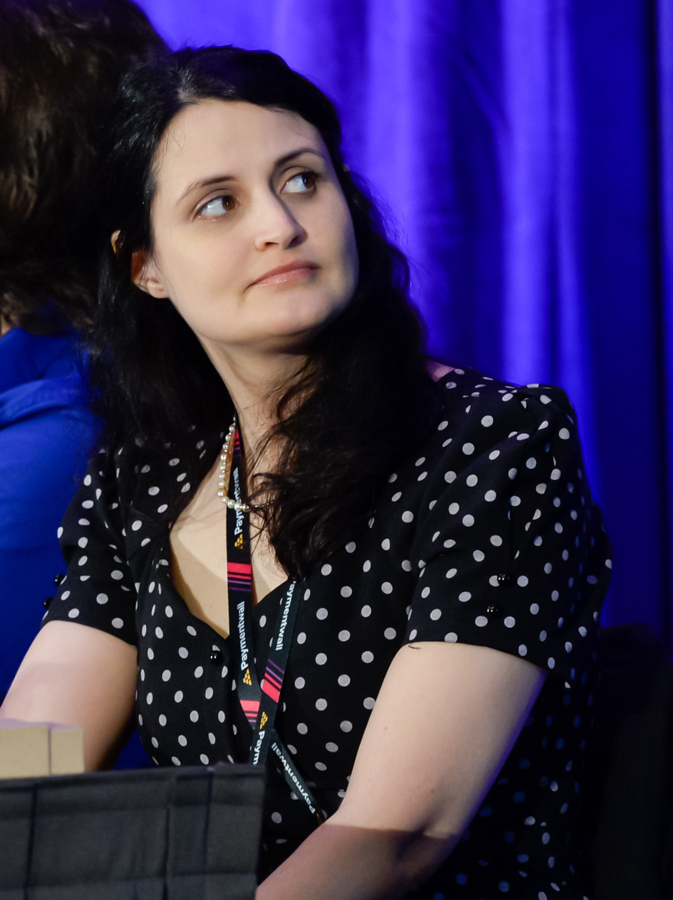
- Samantha Gorman, panelist at Game Developers Conference's Narrative Innovation Showcase in 2016.
- Occupations: Game developer, writer, academic
- Years active: 2010–
- Known for: immersive VR narratives, gestural interfaces

Samantha Gorman is an American game developer known for her combination of narrative, theatricality and gaming in VR environments, and for introducing gestural interactions in touchscreen narratives. She has won multiple awards for her work, both in the field of games and in electronic literature and new media writing. Gorman co-founded the computer art and games studio Tender Claws in 2014 and has been an assistant professor at Northeastern University since 2020.

== Education and career ==
Gorman completed her undergraduate work at Brown University working in literary arts and digital performance. She then earned a master's degree in fine art from Brown University in 2010. She completed a PhD. in media arts and practice at the University of Southern California in 2020.

Gorman first encountered VR narratives at Brown's writing program, a program where VR narratives and poems were developed from the early 2000s, and she created Canticle there, combining poetry with a dancer, and exploring the theatricality of VR. She continued to work on VR while at USC.

== Gestural interaction in digital narratives ==
The gestural modes of narrative interaction Gorman launched in the iPad novella Pry, co-authored with Danny Cannizzaro and released by the studio Tender Claws in 2014, have been analysed by scholars and reviewed in both literary and mainstream media including Vice and Wired. A review in the LA Review of Books opened by stating that "Everyone interested in the contemporary state or future of literature as a hybrid tactile mediated experience should experience Pry", although the reviewer also notes that the novelty of the interaction design eclipsed the narrative itself. Digital poet John Cayley wrote that Pry "proclaims (..) that gestures will be an intimate and necessary aspect of the experience of reading, as reading changes for all of us". In an interview with Gorman for his book The Digital Imaginary, cinema studies scholar and director Roderick Coover describes Gorman as "making a case for new media offering a more complex form of authoring". In an interview after winning the 2014 New Media Writing Prize, Gorman argues against overemphasising technological newness, saying that despite Pry using "new tool sets, but it is still a very human story".

Pry won the Electronic Literature Organization's award for best creative work, as well as the New Media Writing Prize, and was listed as one of Apple's 25 best apps of 2015. Pry has been profoundly influential in the fields of electronic literature and digital narrative. Writing for The Cambridge Companion to Twenty-First Century American Fiction, Scott Rettberg explains that the "reader's interaction with Pry is primarily about reaching into the protagonist's mind to access his thoughts and emotions. Physical gestures serve as metaphors as well as ways to traverse the text". This pioneered the use of gestural interactions as story-bearing elements in a work of digital narrative. As Janeen Naji writes, "the haptic gestures of tap, swipe and pinch are also imbued with meaning". The work has been taught at at least five universities.

== Work in VR ==
The game Virtual Virtual Reality won the Google Play award for best VR experience in 2017. The online production of Shakespeare's play The Tempest, an interactive theatre experience in the VR world The Under Presents, received the 2020 best narrative experience award from the Raindance Film Festival. The Tempest was a virtual reality theater event was developed during the COVID-19 pandemic, when in person theater was not possible. The production was favourably reviewed by The New York Times, Theater Journal, CNET, and Los Angeles Times.

In 2023, Gorman and Danny Cannizzaro and their company Tender Claws are releasing a VR game for Stranger Things in collaboration with Netflix.

== Invited speaker ==
Gorman has been a keynote speaker or invited speaker at scholarly and industry events including Games for Change in 2021, the 2015 Electronic Literature Conference and the 2019 Immersive Design Summit.

== Notable works ==
- Pry (2014)
- Virtual Virtual Reality
- The Under Presents (2019)
- Stranger Things VR (2024)
