= Cart Life =

2010 video game

- Developer: Richard Hofmeier
- Publisher: Adventure Game Studio
- Designer: Richard Hofmeier
- Engine: Adventure Game Studio
- Platform: Windows
- Release: WW: 29 July 2010; WW: 18 March 2013 (Steam)
- Genre: Simulation
- Mode: Single-player

Cart Life is a simulation video game developed by Richard Hofmeier using Adventure Game Studio for Microsoft Windows released in 2010. The game was added to Steam in March 2013 but later removed when Hofmeier released the full source code for free.

In Cart Life the player controls one of three street vendors, and attempts to run their shop while looking after their health, interests, and families. The game is designed on a pixel-grid in grayscale, with minimal detail, to better allow the player to deduce the mood of each of the three vendor characters.

The game was received well by critics, with particular praise for the relatable characters, though some critics criticised technical issues. In 2013 Cart Life won the Independent Games Festival Seumas McNally Grand Prize, Nuovo Award, and Excellence in Narrative award.

In late 2021 Cart Life made a come back. Developed exclusively for iPad by Elliott McAllister, with a playable character, Andrus. Cart Life for iPad was approved for sale on the App Store on December 10, 2021 and has since been available to install on all iPads running iPadOS 11.0 or later.

Cart Life returned to Steam on March 20, 2023, published by AdHoc Studio. It was set to be released in 2023. The game never released, and in a June 2024 forum post, Hofmeier announced that the project was dead.

== Gameplay ==
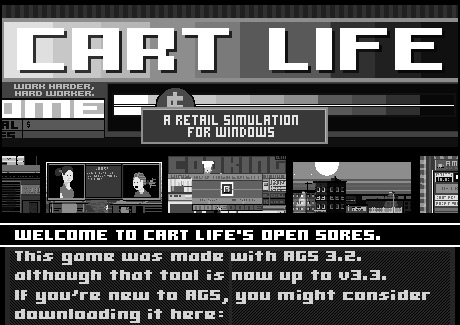

In Cart Life, players control one of three characters, each of whom has a different street vending job; Vinny sells bagels, Andrus runs a newspaper stand, and Melanie sells coffee from a cart. While at their stalls players interact with customers by selling them items and can manage their stall by selecting stock, setting prices, and buying new equipment. Players must also look after the character's day-to-day lives, including having adequate food, drink, and sleep. Each character has unique situations to address; Melanie, for example, is a single mother of a daughter. When she's not working, she yearns to bond more with her daughter, in the midst of her difficult busy life. She struggles to have time to walk her daughter to and from school each day, as she seeks custody on limited wages.

== Development ==
Richard Hofmeier's inspiration for the game came from aspects of his own work-life experiences, as well as from playing other games like Little Computer People and River City Ransom. He drew inspiration from Han Hoogerbrugge's Modern Living, saying that he thought about it "almost every day" while developing Cart Life. Hofmeier credits his partner with supporting him throughout the game development.

Cart Life is Hofmeier's first game, drawing upon his experience as an illustrator. He developed the game in his spare time using Adventure Game Studio while working what he describes as a "bunch of bad jobs". He initially planned to finish the development in 30 days but he worked on development for three years. He wanted to make a game which had no high scores, points, or action, and originally envisaged it as a comedy.

Of the game's pixel art design, Hofmeier said that he did not choose it to be nostalgic but rather because he wanted players to fill in the extra details with their own thoughts and experiences, saying that it took more time and effort than other possible styles. During development Hofmeier spoke to a number of street vendors to research their work who were enthusiastic about the creation of the game.

During development Richard Hofmeier experimented with many elements which were eventually removed, including a fourth character and a number of extra stores and locations. At the 2013 Independent Games Festival, Hofmeier spray-painted his own booth to instead display Porpentine's game Howling Dogs, saying that he thought "Cart Life had already overstayed its welcome... I wanted people to see this game."

In March 2014, with Hofmeier saying he was finished supporting the game, the game was removed from Steam while source code and game were made available for free (Freeware) on his website under the "CART LIFE'S FREE LICENSE", a public domain like license. Hofmeier's webpage later went offline due to the increased traffic but the game and source code was mirrored on GitHub.

== Reception ==
Reception

Aggregate score
Aggregator	Score
Metacritic	79/100

Review scores
Publication	Score
Destructoid	6.5/10
GameSpot	7.5/10
GameTrailers	8/10
PC Gamer (UK)	80%
Digital Spy	5/5
National Post	8.5/10

Award
Publication	Award
IGF 2013	Seumas McNally Grand Prize, Nuovo Award, and Excellence in Narrative

Cart Life received "generally favorable reviews" according to the review aggregation website Metacritic

Reviewers commented positively on Cart Life's characters and mechanics. Carolyn Petit of GameSpot described the characters as "wonderfully expressive", particularly because of the attention to small details like eyebrow movements, and having to make tough decisions. In PC Gamer UK's review Alex Wiltshire said the game portrayed "a convincing, empathetic set of portraits." Another well received feature was the game's art style; Ben Lee of Digital Spy found the pixel art to complement the game's portrayal of the mundane aspects of life.

The main criticisms of the game were due to the technical problems and bugs present in the game. GameTrailers' Ben Moore said that he experienced "more than a handful of crashes, scripting errors, and freezes" while playing the game. Petit said that the issues were common and reduced the impact of the game's story for her.

In 2011, Cart Life won two AGS Awards for Best Programming and Best Non Adventure Game Created with AGS.

Cart Life was a finalist for the 2012 Indiecade and won the Seumas McNally Grand Prize, Nuovo Award, and Excellence in Narrative award at the 2013 Independent Games Festival.

== See also ==
- List of open source games
