= With Those We Love Alive =

2014 video game by Porpentine

- Screenshot from early in the game
- Developer: Porpentine
- Composer: Brenda Neotenomie
- Engine: Twine
- Platform: Browser
- Release: October 2014
- Genre: Interactive fiction
- Mode: Single-player

With Those We Love Alive is an interactive fiction video game written by Porpentine Charity Heartscape and scored Brenda Neotenomie. It was released in October 2014, and has versions in both English and Hungarian.

== Gameplay ==
The game was created using Twine. It uses pink text to navigate through the story and purple text to change a word within a particular node of the story. Readers put in information at the start of the story, which will change the text slightly.

During certain points of the story, the player is asked to draw sigils on their skin. By the end of the game, the reader is left with a representation of their choices on their own body.

== Setting ==
''With Those We Love Alive'' is set in a fictional world characterized by a combination of beauty and unsettling imagery, with descriptive language portraying its landscapes and events. The narrative depicts a restrictive society in which inhabitants are expected to obey authority and have limited opportunities to escape.

== Plot ==
The story begins with the Skull Empress guiding the player to her palace to craft many artifacts for her, but between main events, the player is allowed to explore the palace and surrounding areas to be greeted with vivid descriptions of this fantasy world. The descriptions of these locations start becoming repetitive after subsequent visits, requiring players to sleep to advance to the Skull Empress’ next errand.

“Dead people" start to appear in random locations conveyed through blunt text, alluding to the fact that death is common or an expected aspect of day to day life. These dead people are only ever acknowledged by the player, suggesting they may be hallucinations. The culmination of the story explores resistance against the oppressive and escape into a future controlled by yourself, however uncertain. After your childhood friend arrives at the palace, you flee together with their future left uncertain.

== Development and release ==
Released in October 2014, With Those We Love Alive was created by Porpentine Charity Heartscape and scored by Brenda Neotenomie. It has been released in English and Hungarian. In a statement for Electronic Literature Organization's Electronic Literature Collection, Porpentine stated that they were influenced by "mob violence, trash struggle, C-PTSD, and child abuse". Porpentine thought of the various elements in With Those We Love Alive over a long period of time, but once they began work on the game they completed it in only a few weeks. They stated that their decision to have people draw sigils on themselves was due to their frustration with how sleek digital works are, and that wanted to have people "feel something" by bridging the digital and physical.

After the game's release, hundreds of people posted images of the sigils they drew. Porpentine described the experience of having people draw on themselves because of them as overwhelming and intimate. They noted later that most chose to draw on their arm, both for its convenience and expressiveness, but they appreciated when people drew across the rest of their body.

With Those We Love Alive's title likely comes from a quatrain in the Bhagavad Gita:

Better to live on beggar’s bread
with those we love alive,
than taste their blood in rich feasts spread,
and guiltily survive

== Reception ==
With Those We Love Alive's artistry was widely praised by critics. Fellow game developer Emily Short and journalist Leigh Alexander took note of the mix of its beautiful and vulgar qualities, and Alice O'Connor said the writing was "carefully measured". Writer Michael Rougeau also commented on the writing's beauty, believing each word was carefully chosen. The music was praised by Short and the writers of Twining: Critical and Creative Approaches to Hypertext Narratives as a powerful element of the work.

Reviewers cited the mechanic of drawing sigils on the skin as a highlight of the work. Emily Short and Leigh Alexander find the resultant effect as both intimate and creative, Alexander considering it somewhat offputting. Short describes how it made them think about the meanings of areas on her body, and journalist Alice O'Connor said it made her reflect on what kind of person she was.

=== Awards ===
With Those We Love Alive won Best Writing and Best Individual NPC at the 2014 XYZZY awards, and received 5th place at 2014's Interactive Fiction Competition.

== Analysis ==
=== Narrative ===
Arts scholar Claudia Costa Pederson views With Those We Love Alive as an allegory to games communities, particularly of how they can form both oppressive and creative relationships. Pederson sees the relationship between Porpentine and the player via the sigils as one such creative relationship.

=== Structure and gameplay ===
Video game scholar Stephanie Harkin and journalist Alice O'Connor note that, while the fantastical world initially encourages players to explore, once you explore everything you are left alone and waiting. The player will then build a routine of sleeping to advance time, only acting when things are demanded of them. Harkin compares this effect of this routine to that of the game Night in the Woods, and believes the incentivisation for players to stay in bed is evocative of depression.
