= New Media Writing Prize =

British literary award for digital fiction

The New Media Writing Prize
- Awarded for: Innovative digital stories using digital platforms, interactivity and multimedia
- Country: United Kingdom
- Presented by: Bournemouth University
- Reward: £1000
- First award: 2010; 16 years ago
- Website: newmediawritingprize.co.uk

The New Media Writing Prize is an annual, juried competition in the United Kingdom awarding prizes to works of innovative digital fiction that uses interactivity, participatory elements and/or multimedia and achieves "good storytelling". Works that are shortlisted for the prize are seen as "cutting edge, exemplar works, which one might suppose demonstrate the best of everything that new-media storytelling can offer", and are archived by the British Library.

== History ==
The New Media Writing Prize was established in 2010 by James Pope and Sue Luminati as part of the inaugural Poole Literary Festival. From 2011 until 2021 James Pope directed the competition and awards event at Bournemouth University. Lyle Skains is the current director. Support has come from internal funding, and a wide range of external sources including if:book UK, a 'think and do tank' run by the late Chris Meade. The main prize was renamed the Chris Meade Memorial UK New Media Writing Prize in 2021. As of 2023 there is also a student award, an Opening Up Award, a Digital Journalism Award and an Interactive Digital Narrative for Social Good Award. Some years have also included a People's Choice Award.

== Reception ==
The competition has built an international reach and reputation amongst makers and academics in the field of digital storytelling. A 2012 article in The Independent described the prize with a mix of sarcasm and appreciation, starting with the tagline "It's writing, Jim, but not as we know it." The article describes the shortlisted works and encourages readers to vote, although its interviews with traditional publishers who assure the reader that it's "still OK to love real books" has been criticised.

Winning and shortlisted works are archived by the British Library, and on establishing the archive, archivists and prize organisers co-authored a paper outlining challenges of archiving interactive, multimodal literary works. Several winning and shortlisted works were showcased in the 2023 British Library exhibition "Digital Storytelling".

== Winners of the Main Prize ==
Year	Author	Title	Country
2010	Christine Wilks	Underbelly	United Kingdom
2011	Serge Bouchardon & Vincent Volckaert	Loss of Grasp	France
2012	Katharine Norman	Window	United Kingdom
2013	Esmeralda Kosmatopoulos	Siri and Me	Greece/France/Egypt
2014	Tender Claws (Samantha Gorman and Danny Cannizzaro)	Pry (novel)	USA
2015	The High Muck a Muck Collective (Jin Zhang, Thomas Loh, Nicola Harwood, Bessie Wapp, Fred Wah)	High Muck a Muck: Playing Chinese	Canada
2016	J.R. Carpenter	The Gathering Cloud	Canada/United Kingdom
2017	James Attlee	The Cartographer's Confession	United Kingdom
2018	Amira Hanafi	A Dictionary of the Revolution	USA / Egypt
2019	Maria Ivanova	The life of Grand Duchess Elizabeth	Belarus
2020	Dan Hett	c ya laterrrr	United Kingdom
2021	Joannes Truyens	Neurocracy	United Kingdom
2022	Everest Pipkin	Anonymous Animal	USA
2023	Florence Walker	I Dreamt of Something Lost	Norway
