= A Dictionary of the Revolution =

Work of electronic literature

- Author: Amira Hanafi
- Language: English
- Genre: electronic literature
- Publication date: 2018
- Awards: New Media Writing Prize

A Dictionary of the Revolution is an electronic literature work created by poet and artist Amira Hanafi. Completed in 2017, the work consists of 125 terms that describe the language of the 2011 Egyptian uprising. Participants of the work ranged from five locations in Egypt.

== Origins and influences ==
A Dictionary of the Revolution is Hanafi's response to the 2011 Egyptian uprising and documents the cultural reactions of the uprising. The revolution began on January 25, 2011, and would end on February 11, 2011. Due to the jailing of journalists in Egypt post-uprising, all interviews captured for A Dictionary of the Revolution were conducted in private.

=== Publication history ===
Hanafi was awarded a grant from the Arab Fund for Arts and Culture for the publishing of A Dictionary of the Revolution. The work was commissioned to be digitally published by Rhizome.

== Themes ==
Participants of A Dictionary of the Revolution were asked to react to a word on a note card, and to describe their experiences relating to the term. Some terms used in A Dictionary of the Revolution include "revolution", "January 25", "terrorism", and "onion". The terms in the dictionary vary, but all correlate to someone's experience before, during, or after the 2011 revolution. "KFC", "Nesto Cheese", and "Guy Fawkes Mask" are terms used in A Dictionary of the Revolution that have more offbeat contexts but also made the cut.

== Structure and navigation ==
The terms in the dictionary are organized around in a circular graph, and are organized in alphabetical order. Inside the circle, the reader is able to see how terms connect to each other. Though structured, A Dictionary of the Revolution is fluid, so readers don't have to follow a certain path.

== Literary significance and critical reception ==
A Dictionary of the Revolution won Denmark’s Public Library Prize for Electronic Literature in 2019 and the New Media Writing Prize in 2018.
