= Christine Wilks =

British writer and artist

Christine Ann Wilks (born 1960) is a British digital writer and artist whose work in electronic literature has been published in online journals and anthologies. Her interactive Fitting the Pattern (2008) depicting memories of her mother by drawing on dressmaking tools is considered to be a "born digital" work. Underbelly, presenting a digital account of women working in the pits of northern England, won the New Media Writing Prize 2010 as well as the 2010/11 MaMSIE Digital Media Prize. In 2021, Wilks earned a Ph.D. in digital writing from Bath Spa University with a thesis titled "Stiched Up in The Conversengine: Using Expressive Processing and Multimodal Languages to Create a Character-Driven Interactive Digital Narrative".

== Biography ==
Born in June 1960, as of mid-2022, Christine Wilks is based in Leeds in the north of England. After graduating in fine art from the South Glamorgan Institute of Higher Education in 1982, Wilks earned a master's degree in Fine Arts from the Cardiff Institute of Higher Education in 1992. In 2008, she received a second master's degree in creative writing and new media from De Montfort University. She went on to earn a Ph.D. in digital writing from Bath Spa University in 2021.

Wilks has spent many years with the electronic learning company, Make It Happen Now, where since 2011 she has served as creative director. From 2007, she was a key member of R3M1XW0RX, a remixing project for digital media which was developed until 2012.

Wilks recounts that she began as a visual artist but moved into filmmaking and joined the trAce Online Writing Centre, set up by Sue Thomas.

== Awards ==
Underbelly won the New Media Writing Prize 2010 and the MaMSIE Digital Media Competition 2011.

== Works ==
=== Electronic literature works ===
- Writing New Body Worlds
- Stitched Up
- Inkubus, 2014. This is a largely 3D narrative-based game. Reviewed in Electronic Literature as Digital Humanities
- A Revolution of Words (HTML, CSS, JavaScript)
- Upside Down Chandelier (Collaboration with Maria Mencia, Jeneen Naji, and Zuzana Husárová)
- R3M1XW0RX, 2007–2013, various media
- A crissxross trail (originally included Flash)
- Rememori, 2011 (originally Flash)
- Out of Touch, 2011 (originally Flash)
- Underbelly, 2010 (originally Flash) . Underbelly explores a hypertext-guided connection between the carving of a successful sculptor of today and the submissive women who in the past carved out coal from a Yorkshire colliery. Published in Studies in the Maternal, Volume 3 • Issue 2 • 2011 • Special Issue: Motherhood, Servitude and the Delegation of Care Wilks analyzes this piece in #WomenTechLit
- Fitting the Pattern, 2008 (originally Flash). The interactive Fitting the Pattern (2008) depicts memories of her mother by drawing on the vocabulary of dressmaking tools. It is considered to be a "born digital" work. The reader is required to cut, sew and weave to appreciate the relationship between daughter and mother.
- Tailspin, 2008 (originally Flash)
- Heights, 2006 (originally Flash). This poem was inspired by the Sagrada Familia and other church spires.
- IntraVenus, 2005 (originally Flash). This work combines an image from the Venus of Urbino by Titian as well as voices and photography in a complex polysemy: a phonetic game showing both desire and violence.
- We Drank, 2005 (originally Flash)
- Social Dis-Ease, 2004 (originally Flash)
- Sitting Pretty aka Before We Begin, 2004 (HTML and CSS)

=== Essays ===
- These Waves …:" Writing New Bodies for Applied E-literature Studies Also published in First Person Scholar.
- Chapter 7: Bodies in Elit Edited by Dene Grigar & James O’Sullivan Bloomsbury Academic Bloomsbury Publishing Inc. 2021
