= The Writer Will Do Something =

2015 video game

- Screenshot of gameplay
- Engine: Twine
- Platform: Browser
- Release: 2015
- Genre: Interactive fiction

The Writer Will Do Something is an interactive fiction video game written by Matthew S. Burns and Tom Bissell and created using Twine.

== Development ==
The game was originally written in 2015 by Matthew S. Burns and Tom Bissell. Bissell had previously worked on AAA franchises such as Gears of War and Arkham Asylum. Burns aimed to explain to video gaming fans how chaotic and difficult a creative project can be, as he felt critics and fans would often wonder "why didn't the devs just do this" when he felt there were barriers that prevented that which would be explained through this behind-the-curtain look.

From its release to August 2015, the game was played 38,000 times. Players questioned whether developers would be so rude to each other, while developers deemed the game a documentary.

== Plot and gameplay ==
It tells the story of a video game writer sitting through a meeting about a AAA game – the third in the fictional ShatterGate franchise – which is having issues after receiving negative feedback and with a looming E3 date. The game exudes an air of "weary pain", and aims to explore the "debilitating pressure of high-budget videogame writing".

Gameplay sees the player click on the text to view the next text screen. There is limited interactivity with options at various points for what the player should say – ranging from placing blame on others or taking the blame themselves. It has been described as a choose-your-own-adventure.

== Critical reception ==
Waypoint deemed the game a "painfully accurate satire of the role writing often takes in video games." Ars Technica deemed it a "gripping, well-constructed work" and outlined what it saw as the game's thesis statement: "No one sets out to make a bad game, but bad games still get made all the time." Meanwhile, Rock, Paper, Shotgun felt it was a "mix of sharp social observation and collective embarrassment". Kill Screen compared the game's keen sense of auteur status to those of Cibele, The Beginner's Guide, and Emily Is Away, and further described it as a "PTSD flashback" with circular arguments and no clear solution. Wired suggested that to video game players, this is a clever way for them to break their rose-tinted glasses of how their favorite games get made. Gamasutra noted that while there are practical guides, blogs and talks available to teach aspiring writers how to write video games, this is a rare interactive experience that demonstrates what it is actually 'like' to write a video game, likening it to "Empathy Machines" as defined by Liz England.

The game received an honorable mention in the "Excellence in Narrative" category at the 2016 IGF awards.
