= Arc Symphony =

Adventure video game

- Promotional art for the game, also used as cover art for the fake game boxes
- Developers: Matilde Park; Penelope Evans
- Engine: Twine
- Platforms: Microsoft Windows, MacOS, Linux, web browsers
- Release: May 15, 2017
- Genre: Adventure
- Mode: Single-player

Arc Symphony is an adventure video game developed by Matilde Park and Penelope Evans, and released on May 15, 2017, both as a browser game and in a downloadable version for Microsoft Windows, MacOS, and Linux. The player takes the role of a formerly active user of a Usenet newsgroup for a fictional Japanese role-playing game (JRPG), also titled Arc Symphony, and reads messages from the game's characters.

As part of the game's release, fake game boxes for the JRPG, in the style of those for PlayStation JRPGs, were created and given to the developers' friends, who shared photos of it on social media with comments pretending that the JRPG was a real game; additionally, a fake fan site for the JRPG was created to further the illusion that it was real. Critics liked the game and its marketing, calling them accurate to fan communities in the 1990s.

== Overview ==
Arc Symphony is a text-based adventure game, and is presented as an old computer through which the player reads messages in a Usenet newsgroup dedicated to a fictional Japanese role-playing video game (JRPG) for the PlayStation game console, also titled Arc Symphony.

The player takes the role of a formerly active user of the group, and begins the game by taking a personality quiz. Messages include discussions about the fictional Arc Symphony's characters and writing, and about the newsgroup users' usernames. The characters the player interacts with include a couple who chat on IRC at the same time by using two phone lines, a new user who provokes people, and a university professor who wants to be called by his username rather than his real name when in the newsgroup.

== Development and release ==
Arc Symphony was developed by Matilde Park and Penelope Evans using the game engine Twine. Both of them had prior experience with fan communities: Evans mentioned having been a member of message boards for the game The Sims 2 as a child and having nostalgic feelings for it, while Park said that although she did not miss old websites, bulletin board systems and mailing lists, they still were a part of her. Evans described the game's interactions as feeling like a real forum experience, saying that while people look at pixels at their screen, a real person is on the other side, and that both parties get to accept or reject the other, with the possibility of hurting them.

After the completion of the development, they thought about how to launch the game, and came up with the idea to put together fake game boxes for the fictional Arc Symphony, consisting of a PlayStation-style jewel case and JRPG-like cover art with inaccurate Japanese text. The unnatural Japanese text on the case reads "Fly Shooting Free (of charge), Tactical, Flight Actions"(フライ射撃無料 タクティカル フライトの行動) A few of these were given out to friends as keepsakes, who would play along with the illusion that the Arc Symphony JRPG was a real video game by posting about it on social media, sharing photographs of the jewel cases on the internet accompanied with comments about the nostalgic feelings they supposedly had for the game.

Park said that she liked this idea, since it replicated the game's premise of learning about a game through its fan community in real life. Park and Evans brought the remaining cases to the Toronto Comic Arts Festival, where more people joined in; according to Park, some people insisted that they remembered playing the Arc Symphony JRPG, something she described as feeling surreal. In addition to the case, a fake fan site for the JRPG was created in the style of fan sites from the 1990s; it was coded by Park, and includes fake fan fiction. As she had never been interested in fan fiction herself, she described what she had written as "accurately bad".

Following a countdown on the fan site, the game was released on May 15, 2017, through Park's Itch.io page, and is available both as a browser game and in a downloadable version playable on Microsoft Windows, MacOS and Linux. The game is also accessible from within Park and Evans' game Subserial Network.

== Reception ==
Julie Muncy of Wired called the game "engaging [and] incredibly polished" despite its short playtime, and described it and its marketing as similar to performance art.

Polygon's Allegra Frank found the game "amusing and quirky", and also commented positively on the marketing, saying that she was amazed by how it manipulated people's memories.

Gita Jackson at Kotaku said that the marketing fooled her due to how accurate the fan site was to real performance of fandom in the 1990s, and called it part of what makes the game work, as it sets up nostalgia for the JRPG, making it easier to pretend to be a fan of it within the game. She described the game as feeling "like a snapshot of [a] world long lost", with an accurate cast of characters.

Brendan Caldwell at Rock, Paper, Shotgun included Arc Symphony on a list of recommended free games, where he called its characters and the interactions between them realistic, and described it as fun to see the "quirks and squabbles" of fandoms as an unseen observer.
