= Porpentine Charity Heartscape =

American video game designer and writer

Porpentine
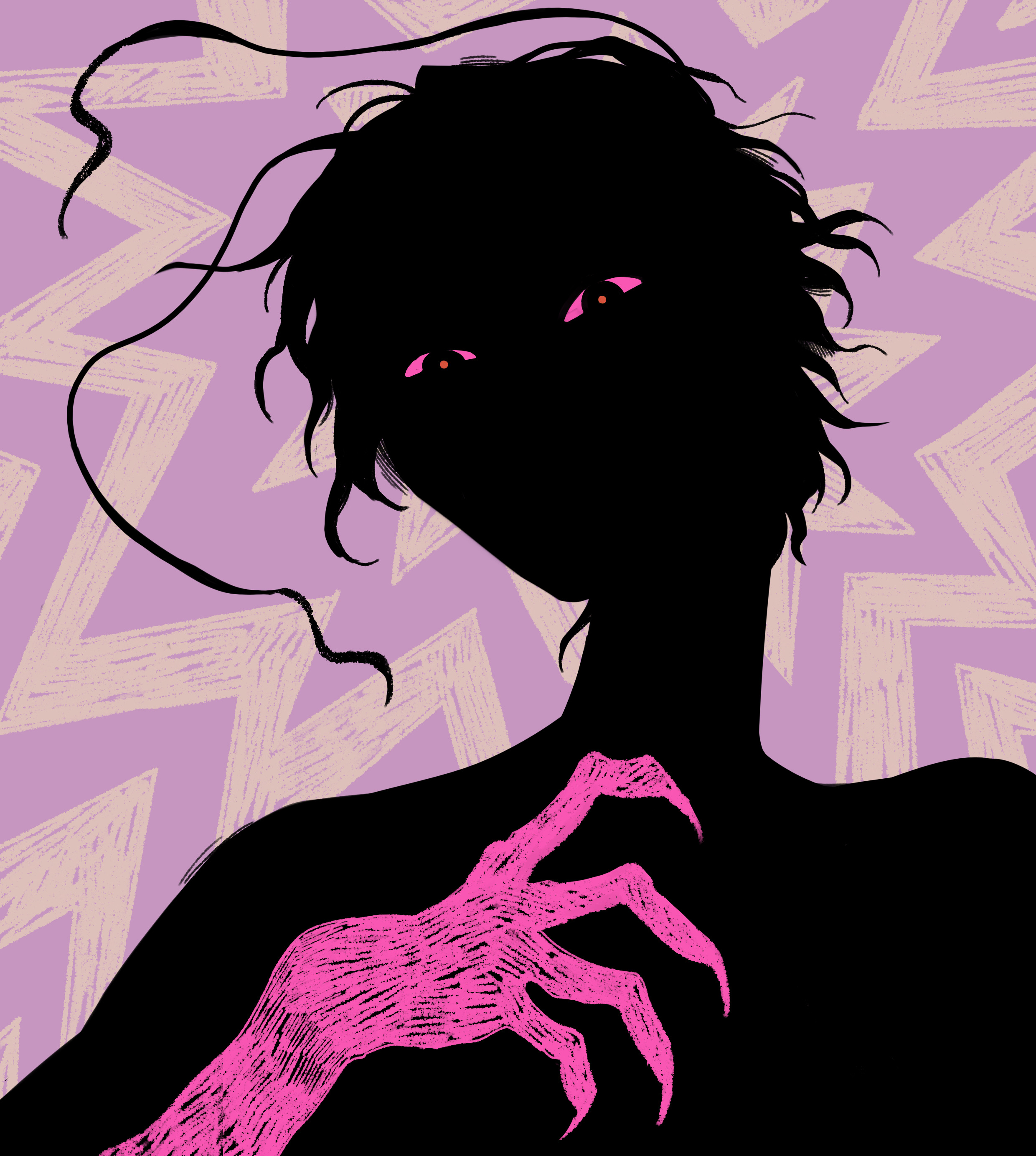
- Illustration used by Porpentine
- Other name: Xrafstar
- Occupations: Video game designer; writer; artist
- Years active: 2012–present
- Website: https://xrafstar.monster

Porpentine Charity Heartscape is a video game designer, new media artist, writer and curator. While their (Note: Porpentine says of their pronouns: "realistically i use 'they' and any are fine if you're horney". For clarity, accessibility, and consistency, this article uses they/them throughout.) early work was hypertext games and interactive fiction built with Twine, in the mid-2010s they began working with a wide range of mediums and tools, and have since published several written works.

They have been awarded a Creative Capital grant, a Rhizome.org commission, the Prix Net Art, and a Sundance Institute's New Frontier Story Lab Fellowship. Their work was included in the 2017 Whitney Biennial.

== Biography ==
Porpentine Charity Heartscape started making games at an early age, creating "cargo cult" versions of levels from Nintendo 64 games on index cards and then having other kids play them as they narrated and made decisions. They were kicked out of their home at age 14, and were housing insecure for several years, describing their life before creating video games as "just surviving".

They were an editor for freeindiegam.es, a curated collection of free, independently produced games. In 2012 they contributed a weekly series to the online PC gaming magazine Rock, Paper, Shotgun titled "Live Free, Play Hard".

Porpentine's 2012 Twine game Howling Dogs incorporates themes of escapism, violence and religious experience, though they have stated that it should be open to interpretation. They created Howling Dogs shortly after they started hormone-replacement therapy in 2012, in only seven days, while staying in a friend's remodeled barn. It won the 2012 XYZZY awards in the "Best story" and "Best writing" categories. The Boston Phoenix listed it as one of their "Top 5 indie games of 2012".

During the 2013 Game Developers Conference, game designer Richard Hofmeier used the booth he had been given to showcase his own award-winning game Cart Life to showcase Porpentine's Howling Dogs instead. Hofmeier spray-painted the words "Howling Dogs" across the banner of his own booth, and showed Porpentine's game instead of his own. Hofmeier stated he wished to give greater exposure to Porpentine's game.

In a 2013 interview with journalist Leigh Alexander, they described being tired by some elements of their reception, such as being portrayed as a figurehead of a movement and being repeatedly asked to talk about bad life experiences.

In 2015 they released Eczema Angel Orifice, a compilation of over 20 hypertext works from 2012 to 2015. The compilation includes critically acclaimed games such as With Those We Love Alive, a queer fable about isolation, abuse, and the relationship between art and power; and Ultra Business Tycoon III, a sprawling textual world disguised as edutainment software.

In 2016, Rhizome commissioned Porpentine along with Neotenomie and Sloane through the series First Look: New Art Online resulting in Psycho Nymph Exile. This work includes an online hypertext work, a booklet, and stickers. The project depicts the experience of PTSD as a visceral physical substance, not an invisible, abstract force.

In the 2020s, Porpenine shifted to written works, including the series Cunt Towards Enemy, the novel Serious Weakness, and the story collection Torture Works.

In 2026, Porpentine released Money for Girls: Amortized, a visual novel with horror and detective elements. It is a collaboration between them and the artist Vich, with music by several artists including Lauren Bousfield and Ada Rook. The game is part of a larger multimedia series, with many stories focusing on variations and alternate versions of the game's protagonist, Cancer Prize.

== Artistry ==
Trash has been a common theme in Porpentine's art since their early works, such as Howling Dogs. Trash is glorified, representing that which is disposable and considered worthless, but which people can reclaim and find refuge in. Porpentine extends these elements to their own life, referring to themselves as "trashgender" and "trash-bodied". Trash has continued to play a part in Porpentine's art, with them stating in 2024 "My work has only gotten more rancid." They embrace other lowbrow motifs like sex and waste, saying that they write for juvenile and "chuuni" tastes. Defamiliarization is common in Porpentine's art, tying the mundane, "food and shit", with fantastical elements. They argue that this defamiliarization is to break down the categories people are forced into, which are used to support institutions while harming those who are categorized. Many of their early works have been described as "dissociative", with an unclear perspective and settings. However, their 2017 series No World Dreamers: Sticky Zeitgeist marked a shift away from this style, instead focusing on distinct characters.

Porpentine has stated that they are most inspired by their "dreams and porn", but also reference the work of Shintaro Kago and Aeon Flux as early inspirations. They have cited the work of Thecatamites, Fear and Hunger, Disco Elysium, and Pathologic as returning inspiration for how games can experiment, and The Pillow Man and Zoo Story as inspirations in their play-like works. Their work has reimagined genres such as science fiction, fantasy, and body horror.

Porpentine's work has employed a wide variety of mediums, including video games, prose works, graphic novels, interactive fiction, and museum installations. Their 2016 multimedia work Psycho Nymph Exile includes a novella, sticker pack, the interactive poems Girlbeam and Probiotic River Therapy, a photography website, and a series of minigames titled Girlshard Portal unlocked through keywords in the novella. While their earlier video games were primarily created in Twine, episodes two and three of No World Dreamers used GameMaker and HyperCard respectively, representing a shift away from the software. Porpentine has used more unusual tools as well, such as Google Forms for their 2016 game All Your Time-Tossed Selves. They made most of their early games free on their website so that more people, who might not be able to buy their games, had access to them.

== Selected works ==
=== Video games ===
Year	Title	Ref.
2012	Howling Dogs	
2013	Their Angelical Understanding	
2013	Ultra Business Tycoon III	
2014	With Those We Love Alive	
2014	Everything You Swallow Will One Day Come Up Like A Stone	
2015	Neon Haze	
2017	No World Dreamers: Sticky Zeitgeist	
2026	Money for Girls: Amortized	

=== Written works ===
Year	Title	Notes	Ref.
2016	Psycho Nymph Exile	Novella	
2022	Serious Weakness	Novel	
2024	Torture Works	Short story collection	

== Awards ==
=== 2012 ===
- XYZZY Best Writing for Howling Dogs
- "Golden Banana of Discord" for Howling Dogs at the 2012 Interactive Fiction Competition, a prize awarded for the highest standard deviation "both the most loved and the most hated."

=== 2013 ===
- XYZZY Best Writing for Their angelical understanding
- Indiecade Special Recognition for Porpentine's Twine Compilation

=== 2014 ===
- XYZZY Best Writing and Best Individual NPC for With Those We Love Alive
- Wordplay Festival Award for Most Unique World: With Those We Love Alive

=== 2016 ===
- Creative Capital Emerging Fields for Aria End (in collaboration with Peter Burr)
- Otherwise Award Fellowship

=== 2017 ===
- Prix Net Art, in collaboration with Rhizome and Chronus Art Center
- With Those We Love Alive and howling dogs included in the Whitney Biennial

=== 2018 ===
- Sundance Institute New Frontier Lab Programs Fellow
