= Amira Hanafi =

American poet and artist

- Born: 1979 (age 46–47); Vermont, U.S
- Occupations: Poet, Artist
- Writing career
- Genre: Electronic literature
- Notable work: A Dictionary of the Revolution (2017)

Amira Hanafi (born 1979) is an American-born poet and artist who has published several works of electronic literature. They hold both American and Egyptian citizenship. A Dictionary of the Revolution, a creative work they completed in 2017, documents the 2011 Egyptian uprising. It was the winner of the 2018 New Media Writing Prize and Denmark's 2019 Public Library Prize for Electronic Literature. Their electronic literature works are replayed and explored on Femmes Literature Electronique (French 2024).

== Biography ==
Born in Vermont in 1979, Amira Hanafi has been based in Cairo since 2010. Their involvement in poetry, culture and art is focused on their interest in working with language.

== Works ==
Minced English (2010) is a collage based on associations with 29 terms for people of mixed race. The pages present sentences evoking the colour and violence of all the relationships which turn up, revealing how a dominant culture lay behind the language. Similarly, Forgery (2011), drawing on language linked to the keyword "Finkl", centers on Chicago's 130-year-old steel forge founded by the German immigrant Anton Finkl of A. Finkl & Sons Steel.

Published in 2020 in both English and Arabic, A Dictionary of the Revolution is designed to reveal details of the 2011 uprising based on meetings with 200 people from six Egyptian regions. Hanafi asked them to choose one of 160 words related to the revolution and express their reactions. Their responses were woven into a network of multi-voiced storytelling of the event. In 2018, the work won the New Media Writing Prize in a collaboration between Bournemouth University and if:book uk. In May 2019, it was awarded the Danish Public Library Prize for Electronic Literature. This work is featured in The NEXT Museum's exhibition Vision UnBound 2024.

The CreaTures Glossary is "a set of tools for giving meaning to a lexicon of terms related to creative practice and transformational change." A distinctive compilation that transcends traditional boundaries in creative discourse, the project asks you to redefine ordinary terms and provoke thought on the meaning of the words in a new context. Commissioned by the CreaTures Project (Creative Practices for Transformational Futures) in 2021. CreaTures Glossary was partned with a collaboration of Universities to grant funding to the project including: Alto University, the University of Sussex’s Sustainability Research programme, and Utrecht University. CreaTures Glossary adds new meaning to old words by asking readers to engage in various thought exercises. Using language, the project makes readers take a closer look at everyday life. This closer look makes readers more sensitive to the things happening around them such as social interactions and climate change.
