= Howling Dogs =

2012 interactive fiction and Twine game

- Designer: Porpentine
- Writer: Porpentine Charity Heartscape
- Engine: Twine
- Platform: Browser
- Release: 2012

Howling Dogs is a Twine game and piece of interactive fiction created by Porpentine in 2012. The game is text-based and includes occasional abstract pixel art. In 2017, the game was included in the Whitney Biennial.

== Gameplay ==
Howling Dogs opens with a quote from The Day He Himself Shall Wipe My Tears Away by Kenzaburo Oe and starts off in a metal room. The game makes the user repeat basic actions, such as eating, drinking, sleeping and bathing, in a repetitive cycle. As the setting deteriorates over the course of the game, the tasks become harder to perform. The user can escape their surroundings momentarily by putting on a virtual reality visor, which becomes accessible after they perform some of their basic tasks. The virtual reality allows users to escape their cell-like surroundings, and displays a bizarre alternative world and imagery, before ending and bringing the user back to the same room. The game closes with a quote from theologian John Wesley.

The game's visuals consist of a black background with white text and blue hyperlinks, with occasional pixelated images shown when accessing the virtual reality visor.

== Development and reception ==
The game was written within a week, after Porpentine began hormone therapy treatment. They wrote the game while living in their friend's barn. They have stated the game evokes a feeling of someone not being able to take care of themself when they are broke and in a bad living situation. While speaking about the game to The New York Times, they have compared dealing with trauma as similar to being in a dark room.

Writing for Gamasutra, Leigh Alexander called the game an "abstract, often surreal experience centralized on the concept of confinement". According to Mallika Rao of The Village Voice, Howling Dogs "is a commentary on trauma" and "isn't so much a video game as a genre-mash, redolent of choose-your-own-adventure books, an unwritten Black Mirror plot, a poem, a depressive spiral, a manic flight."

In 2012, Howling Dogs won two XYZZY Awards for Best Writing and Best Story. That year, it was also nominated for the categories of Best Game, Best Setting, and Best Use of Innovation.

At the Independent Games Festival in 2013, game designer Richard Hofmeier used his booth for the game Cart Life, which won that year's Grand Prize, to instead display Porpentine's Howling Dogs. He said he wanted to give greater exposure to Porpentine's game, at one point stating "It's really dear to me, this game... it's fucked with my guts in a way that nothing else has".
