= American Society of Reclamation Sciences =

- Formation: 1973
- Headquarters: West Virginia
- Official language: English
- President: Brenda Schladweiler
- Website: https://www.asrs.us/

American Society of Reclamation Sciences (ASRS), formerly known as the American Society of Mining and Reclamation or ASMR, is a society that promotes the advancement of basic and applied reclamation science through research and technology transfer. ASRS is a U.S.-based professional society with membership from academics, students, consultants, and others concerned with mitigating environmental impacts. ASRS initially focused on the development of mining and reclamation practices and policies to mitigate environmental impacts from coal mining. Today the organization focuses on all aspects of land reclamation, protection and enhancement of soil and water resources, abandoned mine lands, climate change, educational outreach, state and federal regulations, reclamation planning, surface water restoration, wetland restoration, and water treatment.

== History ==
=== 1960s ===
Several individuals in the late 1960s recognized the importance that research could play in the development of mining and reclamation practices and policies, and in the mitigation of environmental impacts from mining. An Advisory Council was formed in 1968 which included State and Federal agencies. Bill Plass, Dick Vande Linde and Ben Greene were responsible for establishing the roots of the organization which expanded regionally in 1973. After further geographical expansion, the name was changed to American Council for Reclamation Research in 1978.

=== 1980s ===
As interest in reclamation grew nationally after the passage of the Federal Surface Mining Control and Reclamation Act (SMCRA) in 1977, the organization became national in scope and again changed its name to the American Society for Surface Mining & Reclamation (ASSMR) in 1982.

=== 1990s ===
Dr. Richard (Dick) Barnhisel, Professor of Agronomy and Geology at the University of Kentucky, served as the second executive secretary of the Society (1999-2012). He specialized in reclamation of prime land disturbed by coal mining and published over 50 articles on reclamation.

=== 2000s ===
In 2001, the name of the Society was changed to better reflect the broadening area of applications and interests of its membership. The initial impetus for the Society was the need to respond both to the then extensive impact of current and historic surface mining for coal, and the Surface Mining and Control and Reclamation Act which passed in 1977.

The first issue of the society's magazine, Reclamation Matters, was published in the Spring of 2004. Published bi-annually, it is a full-color magazine with articles that are less technical in nature and portray a view of all thing's reclamation-related.

=== 2010s ===
Between 1984 and 2012, the Society published the proceedings from the national meetings which included all the related presentations. In 2012, the Journal of the American Society of Reclamation (JASMR) began as a replacement for the proceedings. In 2022, the Journal was named Reclamation Sciences and published digitally. In 2013, Dr. Robert Darmody, Emeritus Professor of Pedology at the University of Illinois, became the Executive Director of the Society.

=== 2020s ===
The Society's name was changed once again in 2020 to the American Society of Reclamation Sciences (ASRS) to better recognize its expanding interests in reclamation/restoration of all anthropogenically disturbed lands and waters.

== Technical Divisions ==
Within the Society, technical divisions (TDs) are smaller groups of individuals with a specific professional interest. These TDs represent key technical disciplines that comprise the study and application of reclamation science.

As part of the Society's name change in 2001, the TDs were reviewed and revised to continue the focal transition to reclamation as a whole, rather than mining alone. The current TDs in the Society:

- Soils (characterization, geological materials, and waste associated with disturbances)
- Water (treatment, management, and restoration of water resources)
- Vegetation (Revegetation, land reclamation, establishment of native species to promote self-sustaining ecosystems)
- Wildlife (habitats and population recovery)
- Technology (remote sensing and surveying)
- Engineering and Construction (streambank restoration, treatment processes, ecological engineering)

== Publications ==
=== Reclamation Sciences ===
Reclamation Sciences is the peer-reviewed technical journal of the American Society of Reclamation Sciences. The journal is designed for the dissemination of original knowledge regarding basic and applied solutions related to the reclamation, restoration, rehabilitation, and remediation of terrestrial and aquatic ecosystems and landscapes disturbed by a broad array of human activities. Both the journal and its audience are interdisciplinary. The journal is designed to serve as a bridge between researchers and practitioners of reclamation science.

=== Publication Issues ===
- Reclamation Sciences: Volume 1 (2022)

=== Reclamation Matters ===
The first issue of Reclamation Matters appeared in the Spring of 2004, and the document is now published twice a year.

=== Journal of the American Society of Reclamation Sciences ===
The Journal of the American Society of Mining and Reclamation (JASMR) promoted the exchange of basic and applied solutions for the reclamation, restoration, and revitalization of landscapes impacted by the extraction of natural resources - including, but not limited to coal, minerals, gas, and oil. Contributions included original research, case studies, field demonstrations, or policy reviews related to an aspect of ecosystem reclamation.

List of Published JASMR Issues
2012, Volume 1, Issue 1	
2013, Volume 2, Issue 1	2013, Volume 2, Issue 2
2014, Volume 3, Issue 1	2014, Volume 3, Issue 2
2015, Volume 4, Issue 1	2015, Volume 4, Issue 2
2016, Volume 5, Issue 1	2016, Volume 5, Issue 2
2017, Volume 6, Issue 1	2017, Volume 6, Issue 2
2018, Volume 7, Issue 1	2018, Volume 7, Issue 2
2018, Volume 7, Issue 3	
2019, Volume 8, Issue 1	2019, Volume 8, Issue 2
2020, Volume 9, Issue 1	2020, Volume 9, Issue 2
2020, Volume 9, Issue 3	2020, Volume 9, Issue 4

=== Past Conference Proceedings ===
The publishing of conference proceedings was discontinued in 2012 with the first publication of the Journal of the American Society of Mining and Reclamation (JASMR).

Past American Society of Mining and Reclamation Conference Proceedings
Owensboro, KY (1984)	Denver, CO (1985)	Jackson, MS (1986)
Billings, MT (1987)	Pittsburgh, PA (1988 - Volume 1)	Pittsburgh, PA (1988 - Volume 2)
Calgary, Alberta, Canada (1989)	Charleston, WV (1990)	Durango, CO (1991)
Duluth, MN (1992)	Spokane, WA (1993)	Pittsburgh, PA (1994 - Volume 1)
Pittsburgh, PA (1994 - Volume 2)	Pittsburgh, PA (1994 - Volume 3)	Pittsburgh, PA (1994 - Volume 4)
Gillette, WY (1995)	Knoxville, TN (1996)	Austin, TX (1997)
St. Louis, MO (1998)	Scottsdale, AZ (1999)	Tampa, FL (2000)
Albuquerque, NM (2001)	Lexington, KY (2002)	Billings, MT (2003)
Morgantown, WV (2004)	Brekenridge, CO (2005)	St. Louis, MO (2006)
Billings, MT (2006)	Gillette, WY (2007)	Richmond, VA (2008)
Billings, MT (2009)	Pittsburgh, PA (2010)	Bismarck, ND (2011)
Tupelo, MS (2012)		

== Events ==
=== Annual Meeting ===
In 2025, the 42nd Annual Meeting of the American Society of Reclamation Sciences (ASRS) will be held in Butte, Montana. Butte is one of the largest Superfund Areas in the US and has a storied history of mining and reclamation. Technical topics emphasized at the meeting include, but are not limited to abandoned mine lands and the bipartisan infrastructure law, climate change, cover systems, educational outreach, geochemistry, geomorphic landform reclamation, mercury in the environment, PFAS/PFOA, rare earth/critical minerals and their recovery, innovations in reclamation, sediment and soil amendments, seeding and revegetation, stream and river restoration, mapping, remote sensing, urban restoration, and water treatment (active and passive).

=== Webinars ===
Beginning in October 2024, the Society has offered technical webinars and virtual mixers to existing members. The webinars topics cover a variety of topics to include all fields of environmental reclamation.

=== Past Events ===
Article titles, abstracts, and tables of content for the past events, as well as the conference proceedings are publicly available.

== Awards ==
=== Society Awards ===
- William T. Plass Award
- Richard I. & Lela M. Barnhisel Reclamation Researcher of the Year Award
- Reclamationist of the Year Award
- Early Career Award

=== Student Awards ===
- Best Technical Presentation Award
- Memorial Scholarship Awards
- Student Gravel Grants

== See also ==
- National Mining Association
- American Institute of Mining
