= The Under Presents =

2019 video game and performance space

- Developer(s): Tender Claws
- Publisher(s): Tender Claws
- Director(s): Danny Cannizzaro, Samantha Gorman
- Writer(s): Brian Evenson; Samantha Gorman
- Platform(s): Steam VR; Oculus Rift; Oculus Quest
- Release: November 19, 2019
- Genre(s): Magic system, interactive film, artgame, cooperative video game
- Mode(s): Single-player, multiplayer

The Under Presents is a multiplayer virtual reality game and performance space which can also be viewed as an independent video game. It is developed and published by Tender Claws, and was released on November 19, 2019, for Steam VR, Oculus Rift, and Oculus Quest.

== Gameplay ==
The Under Presents is composed of four distinct parts: the introduction tutorial (free), the multi-player main stage, the Timeboat narrative experience, and The Tempest live actor performance. Players appear as dark forms with oval masks made of gold. No voice chat is available, with the exception of the professional actors who appear in The Tempest or at random times in the main stage. The magic system, used to manifest objects and restore scenes in the play area, involves holding the mask in one hand while performing a series of clicks and waves over it with the other hand.

=== The introduction tutorial ===
This component of the game is available for free and lasts approximately 20 minutes. The player is given a backstage tour and puzzles to solve by a non-player character known as the MC, who is in the form of a strange ghostly figure with a huge, misshapen gold mask.

This game introduces the Scrunch Teleport, a unique form of VR locomotion in which the player reaches out and pulls the center of the world towards themselves, and then releases it, whereupon the rest of the world snaps into place so that there is always some part of the field of view that is fixed.

=== The Timeboat experience ===
This is a prerecorded immersive theatre play that takes place between the crew and passengers on board the Aikman as it gets stranded in the ice and runs out of food. The player has to wind time forwards and back to chase down all the characters and storylines in a sort of improvised nonlinear narrative.

=== The main stage ===
A dozen different short acts by the theatrical troupe Piehole take place on the stage in a permanent loop, each introduced by the MC. Players in the game can interact with one another (using hand gestures and movement, no voices), show off, and teach one another the different spells, or venture out into the desert to explore remote areas of the map. Some locations require players to actively collaborate in order to unlock them; in some places, players can acquire different masks.

=== Tempest ===
Tempest was a first-of-its-kind, live, scripted, participatory play that players attended using VR based on several scenes in Shakespeare's The Tempest. The play was first performed in the early stages of the COVID-19 pandemic, from June to September 2020. This was a period with severe impact on the performing arts, as actors were unemployed and audiences unable to attend live theatre. The sense of isolation that was so strong during lockdowns was, according to a reviewer, a core theme in the performance: "Prospero’s isolation is our own, and Miranda’s delight at seeing other humans is similarly our experience".

The performances usually lasted 40 minutes, and audience members were networked into groups of up to six per actor. Tickets were separately purchased for each showing, with the first ticket giving a player access to the multiplayer hub as well as an exclusive mask. During the 24th Annual D.I.C.E. Awards, the Academy of Interactive Arts & Sciences nominated Tempest for "Immersive Reality Technical Achievement".

=== Live cast ===
The live performers in The Under Presents and Tempest were Brandon Bales, Michael Bates, Karlie Blair, Sophie Cooper, James Cowan, Whitton Frank, Molly Fite, Genevieve Flati, Stephanie Hyden, Dasha Kittredge, Alex Knell, Terence Leclere, Deirdre Lyons, Haylee Nichele, Kelly Pierre, Soren Royer-McHugh, and Katelyn Schiller.
