= Mattie Brice =

American video game designer

- Mattie Brice (right) shares a moment with Mitu Khandaker (left) at the 2013 Game Developers Conference
- Education: Florida Atlantic University, New York University
- Occupations: Video game designer, academic
- Notable work: Mainichi (2012)
- Awards: Writers Guild of America Video Game Writing Award nomination Official Selection Award for Mainichi in 2013

Mattie Brice is an independent video game designer, critic, educator, and industry activist. Her games and writing focus on diversity initiatives in the games industry, discussing the perspective of marginalized minority voices to publications like Paste, Kotaku, and The Border House. Her games are freeware and do not require programming to create. Since 2023, she has been an assistant professor at the University of California, Santa Cruz within the department of Performance, Play & Design.

== Career ==
She graduated from Florida Atlantic University, with a Bachelor of Arts in English Literature, Creative Writing, Gender and Sexuality Studies and from New York University with a Masters of Arts. Her background is in media, teaching, and social justice advocacy.

Her game, Mainichi, role plays the day-to-day life of a trans woman. It was exhibited at XYZ: Alternative Voices in Game Design in Museum of Design Atlanta, the first-ever exhibition that highlights the work of women as game designers and artists. It was also exhibited at Indiecade 2013. Her game helps create a notable presence for LGBT+ individuals in video games. Mattie also consults and speaks at gaming-related conferences like the Game Developers Conference, IndieCade, and the Queerness and Games Conference at the Berkeley Center for New Media. She was a consultant for Spirit AI software.

In 2013, she was on a panel about diversity in games at IGDA Summit and GDC. In 2014, she was appointed as one of a hundred judges at the Independent Games Festival. In 2017, she was associate director of IndieCade.

She has taught gaming-related courses at different universities such as New York University and the School of Visual Arts in New York City. Brice is currently a principal faculty member at the University of California, Santa Cruz within the department of Performance, Play & Design.

== Works ==
Games
Title	Year released
Mainichi	2012
DESTROY ALL MEN	2013
Blink	2013
EAT	2013
Mission	2013
empathy machine	2016

== Publications and contributions ==
She is the author of the chapter "Play and Be Real About It: What Games Could Learn From Kink" in the book Queer Game Studies.

She was an interviewee for the chapter "Radical Play Through Vulnerability" in the book Queer Games Avant-Garde, and she was an interviewee for a chapter in Queer and Trans Artists of Color: Volume Two.
