= Sloane Leong =

Cartoonist, artist, and writer

Sloane Leong (born May 22, 1990) is a cartoonist, artist, and writer of Hawaiian, Chinese, Mexican, Native American, and European ancestry.

Leong is a self-taught artist, who began self-publishing at the age of 16. She works on a variety of media, including graphic novels, comics, fiction writing, and poetry, in addition to working as an editor and coach for other creators.

In 2022, she attended the Clarion West's Writers Workshop. In 2023, she was the recipient of the third annual Native American Writer Accelerator Grant, awarded by the Native American Media Alliance in partnership with Netflix. In 2023, she was also selected as a fellow for the 8th annual Native American TV Writers Lab by the Native American Media Alliance.

In 2023, Leong worked with a group of six creators to found the Cartoonist Cooperative, an organization striving to improve labor rights for those in the comics industry and support the work of members.

Leong now resides on Chinook land near Portland, Oregon with her family and three dogs.

== Awards ==
Year	Nominated work	Award	Category	Result	Notes
2016	A Map to the Sun	Ignatz Award	Outstanding Minicomic	Nominated	
2019	Prism Stalker	Ignatz Award	Outstanding Artist	Nominated	
2021	A Map to the Sun	Ignatz Award	Outstanding Graphic Novel	Nominated	
2021	A Map to the Sun	Eisner Awards	Best Publication for Teens	Nominated	
2022	Death in the Mouth: Original Horror by People of Color	Australian Shadows Award	Best Edited Works	Won	

== Works ==
=== Graphic novels and comics ===
- From Under Mountains (story and script by Claire Gibson, cover and story by Marian Churchland)
- Prism Stalker Vol 1
- A Map to the Sun
- Graveneye (illustrated by Anna Bowles)
- Prism Stalker Vol 2: The Weeping Star
- Mirror, Mirror within Betwixt: A Horror Manga Anthology

=== Fiction writing ===
Leong's writing has been published in multiple magazines, journals, and websites including the Analog Science Fiction and Fact, Bamboo Ridge, and Lightspeed Magazine.

=== Editorial ===
- Death in the Mouth: Original Horror by People of Color
