= Jesper Juul (game researcher) =

Danish academic

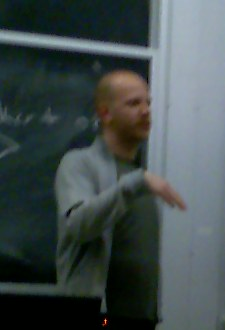
- Born: Denmark
- Education: University of Copenhagen (MA); IT University of Copenhagen (PhD)

Jesper Juul is a Danish game designer, educator, and theorist in the field of video game studies. He is an associate professor at the Danish Design School.

Juul is also a co-editor, with William Uricchio and Geoffrey Long of the MIT Press Playful Thinking series.

He has previously worked at the New York University Game Center, Comparative Media Studies at Massachusetts Institute of Technology, and the Center for Computer Games Research at the IT University of Copenhagen.

He graduated from the University of Copenhagen where he earned a MA degree in Nordic literature. He earned a PhD in video game theory from the IT University of Copenhagen.

== Theoretical work ==
Though his 1999 MA thesis concerned the rejection of narrative as a useful tool for understanding video games, and though Jesper Juul is often considered a ludologist, his more recent work deals with the fictional aspects of video games as well. Juul's book on video game theory, Half-Real: Video Games Between Real Rules and Fictional Worlds was published by MIT Press in 2005, and named by designer Ernest Adams as one of the "50 Books for Everyone in the Game Industry".

His second book, A Casual Revolution, concerns the rise of casual games and the expansion of the video game audience in terms of both age and gender.

Juul says that his third book, The Art of Failure, is about his personal experiences of being an obsessive completionist and the frustration that results of it. It discusses the paradox that players seek out video games even though video games often make players unhappy.

== Other work ==
Juul has also worked as a designer and programmer in video game and chat development, and participated in the Indie Game Jam. He co-organized the first Nordic Game Jam and Computer games and Digital Textualities, one of the first academic conferences on video games.

Juul is a judge at the Independent Games Festival Nuovo awards.

Juul runs a blog on video game theory, The Ludologist.
