= Endless Express =

2014 first-person simulation video game

- Developers: Florian Veltman, Alexandre Taillefert, Martin Gugger, Felix Meunier, and Baptiste Virot.
- Platforms: Microsoft Windows, MacOS, Linux
- Release: 2016
- Genre: Simulation
- Mode: Single-player

Endless Express is a first-person simulation video game developed in 2014 by Florian Veltman, Alexandre Taillefert, Martin Gugger, Felix Meunier, and Baptiste Virot. The game was first created as part of a 7-day game jam, but was later "reimagined" and re-titled "The Endless Express" in 2016, however, the project was discontinued, with its work-in-progress build publicly released. Endless Express was released on Microsoft Windows, MacOS, and Linux systems.

== Development ==
Endless Express was the product of a five person team collaborating at a "7DFPS" game jam in 2014 - an event which is meant for first-person shooter video games, as noted by PC Gamer.

== Gameplay ==
Endless Express' starts off with the player waking up in a train station. Using only a watch and a train timetable, they must find their way home, being sure to catch the correct trains. The game is a combination between accelerated time and semi-real-time, with train stations being in real time and the travel being accelerated. The game also makes use of different animation styles, with low-polygonal textures for terrain, while using a cartoonish style elsewhere.

== Reception ==
it takes one of the most unsettling experiences a person can have and seems to effortlessly turn it into something charming and comfortable.

— Janine Hawkins, VICE

In a November 2014 article, PC Gamer called the gameplay of Endless Express "compelling", with Kotaku stating that it was "full of charm." Kill Screen described the game as having a "dreamlike quality...magical realism."
