= T. L. Taylor =

American academic

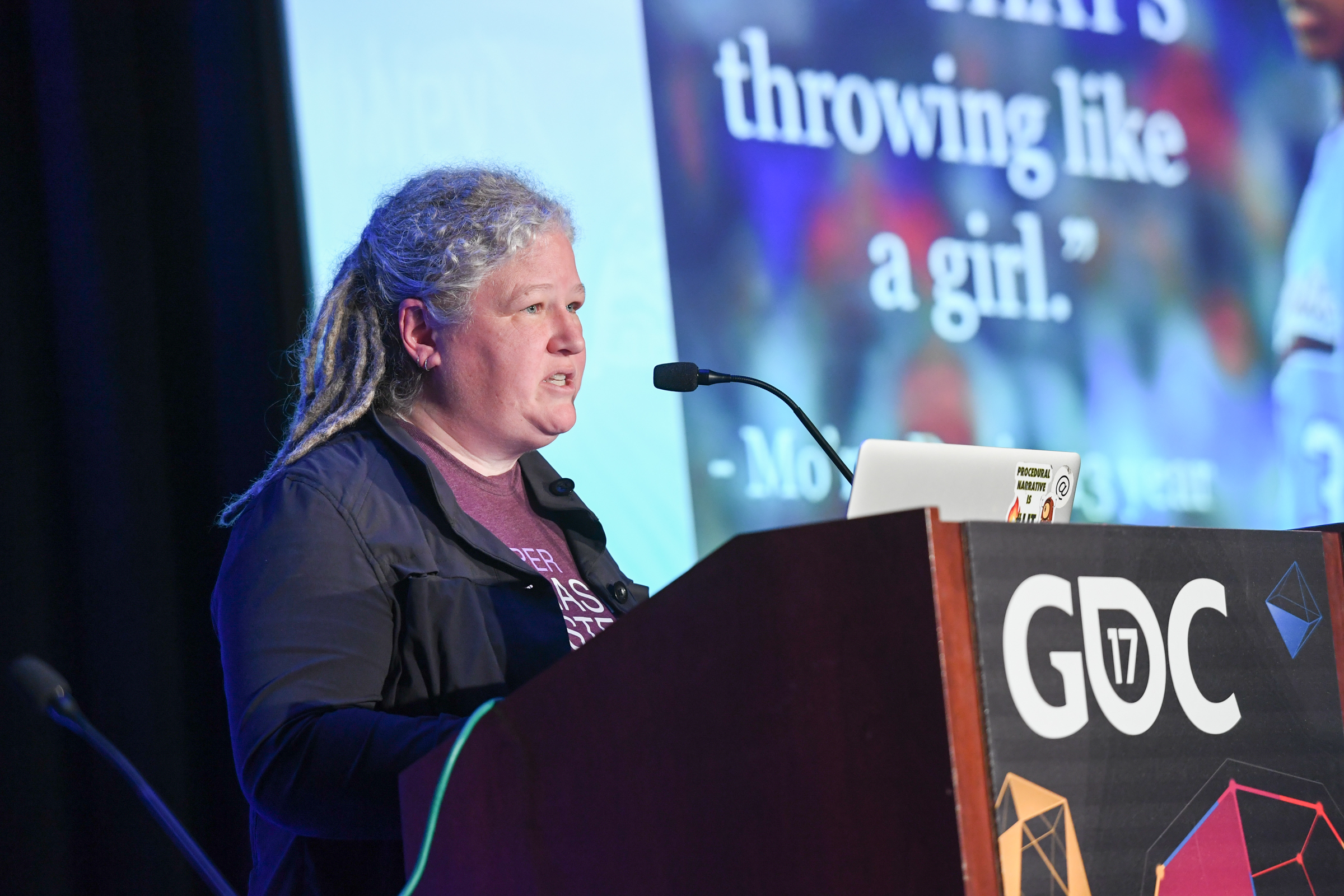
- T.L. Taylor speaking at the 2017 Game Developers Conference

Academic background
- Education: Brandeis University
- Thesis: Living Digitally: Embodiment in Virtual Environments (2000)

Academic work
- Main interests: Sociology, video games

T. L. Taylor (born 1967) is an American sociologist and professor. Taylor specialises in researching the culture of gaming and online communities, in particular, esports, live-streaming, and MMOGs such as EverQuest and World of Warcraft.

== Education ==
She received her Ph.D. (2000) in sociology from Brandeis University. Her dissertation, Living Digitally: Embodiment in Virtual Environments, explored design and embodiment in MUDs and graphical virtual worlds.

== Work ==
Taylor was a founding faculty member of the Center for Computer Games Research at the IT University of Copenhagen where she was a professor from 2003-2012. Before that she was an assistant professor at North Carolina State University. She is currently a Professor in Comparative Media Studies at the Massachusetts Institute of Technology. She has been both a Visiting and Consulting Researcher with the Social Media group at Microsoft Research New England.

She co-founded AnyKey.org with Morgan Romine in 2015 and served as its Director of Research from 2015-2020 then Advisory Committee chair from 2020-2021. AnyKey's aim is to support inclusion and diversity in the gaming and esport community.

Taylor is on the editorial boards of the journals Games & Culture, Social Media and Society, American Journal of Play, and ROMChip. She was a member of Twitch's Safety Advisory Council (2020-2024) and was a member of the Advisory Board for Riot's Scholastic Association of America from 2018-2020.

== Research ==
Taylor has been noted as providing insight into the emerging world of live streaming, the growth of professional esports, and virtual worlds. Taylor also explores the relationship between the self-expression of players and designers' imperatives, as well as challenging the perceived dichotomy between online and offline experience.

Her first book, Play Between Worlds (MIT Press, 2006) focused on the massively multiplayer online game EverQuest. It explored the social aspects of play, powergaming, gender, and the creative practices of players (including intellectual property implications).

Taylor's second book, Raising the Stakes (MIT Press, 2012), examined professional computer gaming. She visited the World Cyber Games, as well as a number of other tournaments and did interviews with a variety of participants in professional competitive gaming. The book looks at a number of topics in esports, including their status as sports, rulesets and competitive play, gender, and spectatorship and performance.

Her most recent book is Watch Me Play (Princeton, 2018). Taylor analyzes the rise of game live streaming, focusing particularly on the platform Twitch. Continuing her interests in the sociology of play, governance, and management, she discusses how live streaming has come to transform everyday gaming, as well as amplify the growth of esports. The book explores the affective and precarious labor of these broadcasters, the emphasis on media entertainment within esports, and the transformative work of live streaming. It won the American Sociological Association's Communication, Information Technologies, and Media Sociology section 2019 book award.

In addition to her work on these subjects, she has also spoken and written on doing ethnographic work that spans both online and offline sites. She is the co-author (with Tom Boellstorff, Bonnie Nardi, and Celia Pearce) of Ethnography and Virtual Worlds: A Handbook of Method (Princeton, 2012), which works as a guide for researches to apply familiar ethnographic research methods towards understanding virtual worlds and participants interactions within them.

== Selected publications ==
- Taylor, T.L. (2018). Watch Me Play: Twitch and the Rise of Game Live Streaming. Princeton, NJ: Princeton University Press. Book home page.
- Taylor, T.L. (2012). Raising the Stakes: E-sports and the Professionalization of Computer Gaming. Cambridge, MA: MIT Press.
- Taylor, T.L. (2012). Ethnography and Virtual Worlds: A Handbook of Method (co-authored with Tom Boellstorff, Bonnie Nardi, and Celia Pearce). Princeton, NJ: Princeton University Press.
- Taylor, T.L. (2009). "The Assemblage of Play". Games and Culture.
- Taylor, T.L. (2006a). Play Between Worlds: Exploring Online Game Culture. Cambridge, MA: MIT Press. ISBN 9780262201636.
- Taylor, T.L. (2006b). "Does WoW Change Everything?: How a PvP Server, Multinational Playerbase, and Surveillance Mod Scene Caused Me Pause". Games and Culture. doi:10.1177/1555412006292615. S2CID 62275844.
- Taylor, T.L. (2003). "Intentional Bodies: Virtual Environments and the Designers Who Shape Them". International Journal of Engineering Education.
- Taylor, T.L. (2002). "Living Digitally: Embodiment in Virtual Worlds". In The Social Life of Avatars: Presence and Interaction in Shared Virtual Environments, R. Schroeder (ed), London: Springer-Verlag.
- Taylor, T.L. (1999). "Life in virtual worlds: Plural Existence, Multimodalities, and other Online Research Challenges". American Behavioral Scientist.
