= KairUs =

Finnish-Austrian artist duo

KairUs (Linda Kronman and Andreas Zingerle)
- Notable work: Suspicious behavior
- Style: Digital art, Media art
- Awards: Austrian Outstanding Artist Award 2022
- Website: http://kairus.org

KairUs is an artist collective consisting of two artists, Linda Kronman (Finland) and Andreas Zingerle (Austria). Their media art focuses on contemporary issues in digital society, and they have created works exploring spam, privacy, smart cities, surveillance and AI. KairUs won the 2022 Austrian Outstanding Artist award in the media arts category.

== History ==
KairUs was established in 2010 by Andreas Zingerle and Linda Kronman. Between 2010 and 2016 their work focused on cyber crime and security. They have been based in Austria, South Korea (both teaching at Woosong University 2017–2018), and Norway (Kronman was a PhD student at the University of Bergen from 2019–2023). They moved to Graz in Austria in 2020.

== Works ==
Megacorp was a cross-media installation that merged copies of the websites of fraudulent companies that only existed online to create a conglomerate "megacorp" with hundreds of subsidiaries, each of which only exists as a basis for phishing or scams.

KairUs has explored smart cities and surveillance in the works Panopticities and Insecure by design. Forensic Fantasies (2016) was a series of three artworks dealing with data breaches of private information, exhibited at the Filodrammatica Gallery in Rijeka. Daniel Becker writes that by using "anonymous but also intimate and personal" data from discarded hard drives, they explored "the relationship between data and identity".

The work Suspicious Behavior: A data annotation tutorial was first exhibited in 2020 In this work, the viewer is asked to play the role of a data annotator, a worker being paid to label surveillance videos to identify whether they show "suspicious behavior". The work has been exhibited at a range of festivals and galleries, including xCoAx 2022, Art Macao: Macao International Art Biennale 2021 and others, and is also available online. The work demonstrates how datasets are created, highlighting the role of underpaid annotators, who are required to work very fast, as well as the difficulty and potential bias in deciding what behavior is "suspicious".

Suspicious Behavior can be experienced online as a browser-based art game. A video "play through" of Suspicious Behavior can be viewed on Vimeo.

Travel4U (2022) is a "virtual travel agency", created in response to the COVID-19 pandemic. The work is a collaboration between Fabian Kühfuß and KairUs. The artwork can be experienced online. Mur.at published an interview with Andreas Zingerle and Fabian Kühfuß in their podcast.

== Artistic research ==
Many of KairUs's artworks are based on artistic research processes. They frequently publish research papers about their art, both as a collective, and individually.

Andreas Zingerle has a PhD from the University of Art and Design Linz (2016). Linda Kronman is a PhD candidate at the University of Bergen, working on an ERC-funded project on machine vision led by Jill Walker Rettberg.

== Selected awards ==
- 2022 Austrian Outstanding Artist award in the media arts category.
- Network Culture award, Stuttgarter Filmwinter Festival for Expanded Media, 2017

== Links to online works ==
- Suspicious Behavior (2020) http://kairus.org/portfolio/suspicious-behavior-2020/
