= Game Off =

Annual video game development event

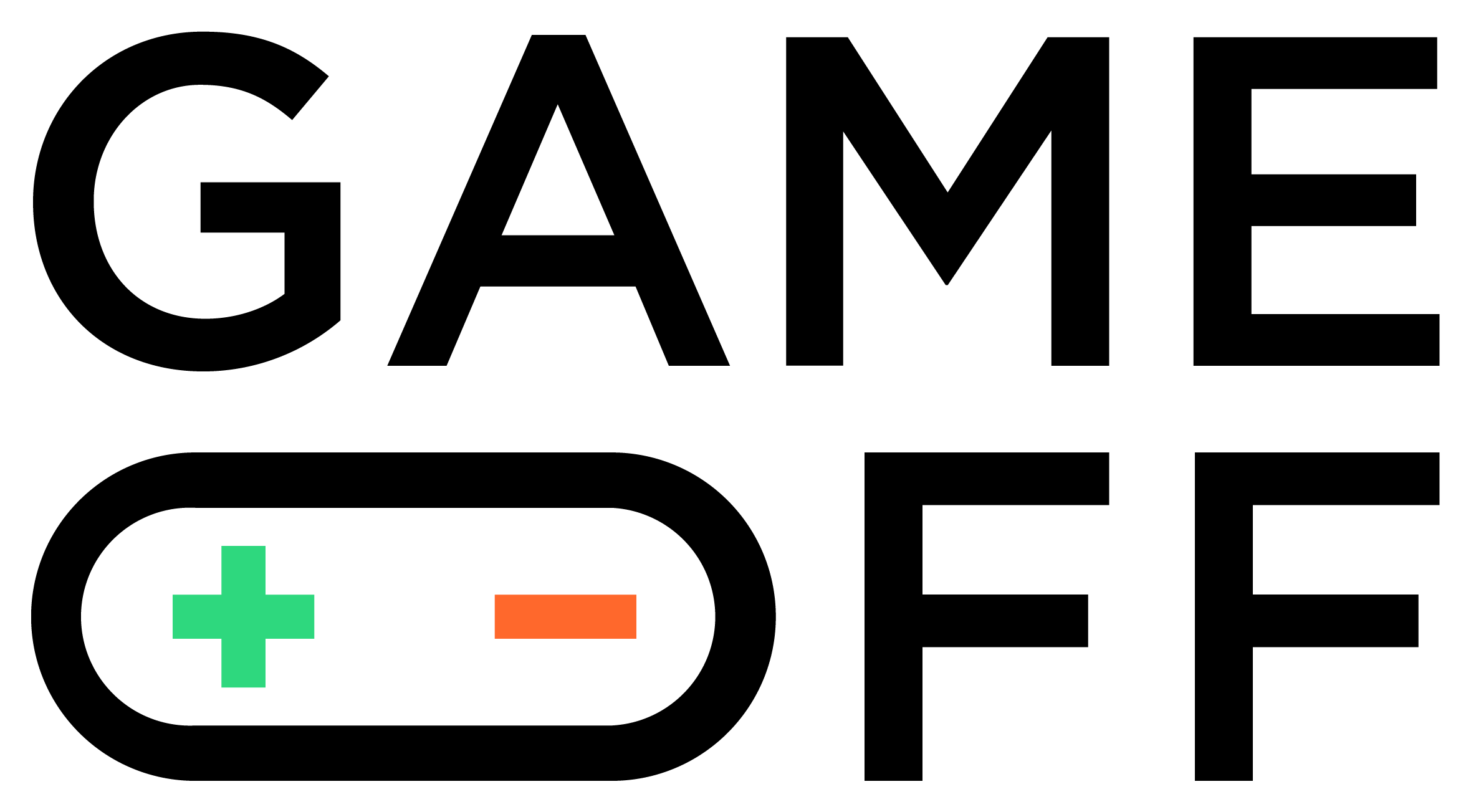
The Game Off logo.

Game Off is an annual game jam celebrating open source created by Lee Reilly in 2012 and sponsored by GitHub. Participants are given the entire month of November to build a game based on a theme–individually or as a team. Inspired by the Global Game Jam, it encourages collaborative game development and promotes the use and sharing of open source software.

== Intellectual property and licensing ==
The use of open source code and freely available assets is encouraged, but it is not a strict requirement. Participants are required to share the code in a public GitHub repository, but the creators own the intellectual property and may license the code however they like. E.g. the overall winner of Game Off V was Daemon vs. Demon, a game built with the open source Godot game engine, with the source licensed under the MIT license and some assets made available under CC-BY-NC 4.0 licenses.

== Past Themes ==
Game Off	Theme
I (2012)	Forking, branching, cloning, pushing, pulling
II (2013)	Change
III (2015)	“The game has changed”
IV (2016)	Hacking, modding and/or augmenting
V (2017)	Throwback
VI (2018)	Hybrid
VII (2019)	Leaps and bounds
IX (2020)	MOONSHOT
X (2021)	BUG
XI (2022)	Cliché
XII (2023)	SCALE
XIII (2024)	SECRETS
XIV (2025)	WAVES

== Competition Structure ==
Game Off I and II required participants to "fork" an empty GitHub source code repository. Many other game jams and hackathons have adopted this approach e.g. Netflix's Cloud Prize, and Canonical's Juju Charm Championship.

Game Off III required participants to choose an existing open source game jam entry to fork it as a starting point.

Game Off IV allowed participants to start with a new repository.

Game Off V was hosted on itch.io, and was recognized the 2nd most popular game jam by number participants and 5th most popular by number of submissions in their yearly review.

Game Off VI was also hosted on itch.io. Overall winner was the game Singularity. There were 329 successful submissions.
