= Lisbeth Klastrup =

Danish scholar of new media (born 1970)

- Born: 1970 (age 55–56) Ringsted (Denmark)
- Occupation: Associate Professor in Digital Culture and Social Media
- Education: Ph.D., IT University at Copenhagen 2003 MA in Comparative Literature, University of Copenhagen 1999 MA in Image Studies, University of Kent at Canterbury 1997

Lisbeth Klastrup (born in 1970) is a Danish scholar of digital and social media. Although her early research was on hypertext fiction, she is now best known for her research on transmedial worlds, social media, and death.

== Career ==
Klastrup is based in Copenhagen, Denmark, and worked as an associate professor at the IT University of Copenhagen, from 2007-2023. During this time, she was affiliated with the Innovative Communication Research Group and the Center for Computer Game Research, and later with the Department of Digital Design, and the research groups CULT (Culture and Technology). In the academic year 2006–2007, she was on leave from the IT University, working as an Associate Research Professor at the Center for Design Research Copenhagen, joining her colleague Ida Engholm. In 2020, she visited Melbourne, Australia, during a sabbatical year, and here worked with colleagues from RMIT - Digital Ethnography Research Center and the Death and Technology Research Team at University of Melbourne. In 2024, she became an external lecturer in Roskilde University.

In 2005, Klastrup chaired the Digital Arts and Culture conference in collaboration with Susana Tosca. In 2008, she chaired the Ninth Annual Conference for the Association of Internet Researchers, Internet Research 9.0. In 2012, she served on the Board of reviewers for Game Studies, the international journal of computer game research. In 2021, she co-chaired the 5th Death Online Research Symposium.

== Works ==
=== Research Overview and Focus ===
Klastrup maintained a research blog from 2001 to 2016, Klastrup's Cataclysms. As part of this blog, until 2016, she maintained a list of blogs by Danish researchers. Klastrup in her early research focused on real-life virtual worlds and how they are used from a social and storytelling perspective, especially concerning online gaming and the concept of worldliness. Klastrup, particularly in a Danish context, now focuses her research on the professional and mundane uses of social media, such as Facebook, Instagram and TikTok, with a special interest in the mediation of serious illness and mourning in this context. In addition, she has participated in a longitudinal study of how users and politicians engage with social media during elections. She has also examined more closely the use and spreading of viral content and memes on Facebook and Reddit, in relation to elections and the COVID pandemic.

=== Published Works ===
With Engholm, Klastrup in 2004 published a Danish anthology on how to analyze digital media, such as games, hypertexts and virtual worlds; Digitale verdener. This was the first book in Danish to introduce this line of study. A reviewed argued that the field of digital media studies as displayed in the book was too broad.

She co-edited The International Handbook of Internet Research, with Jeremy Hunsinger and Matthew Allen, which was published by Springer Verlag in 2010. The Second Edition of the Handbook with all new articles, was published in 2019. The work introduces several academic perspectives to the study of the internet as a social, communicative, and political phenomenon.

In 2016, Klastrup published the introductory book Sociale Netværksmedier (in Danish, Samfundslitteratur), which is widely used in Danish Universities. A second edition of this book will be published in 2024.

In 2019, with Susana Tosca, she published the book Transmedial Worlds in Everyday Life - Networked Reception, Social Media and Fictional World. This work analyzes how people read, interact, watch, and play with fictional worlds through social media (e.g., facebook, You Tube), etc.

== See also ==
- Simulated reality

== Selected publications ==
- Klastrup, Lisbeth. Towards a Poetics of Virtual Worlds: Multi-User Textuality and the Emergence of Story. IT University, Copenhagen: PhD dissertation.
- Klastrup, Lisbeth (2003). "A Poetics of Virtual Worlds" (PDF). Proceedings of the fifth Digital Arts and Culture conference. Melbourne. Archived from the original (PDF) on 2006-09-03.
- Klastrup, Lisbeth (2002). "Interaction forms, agents and tellable events in EverQuest" (PDF). Proceedings of Computer Games and Digital Cultures Conference.
- Klastrup, Lisbeth (2006). "Death Matters: Understanding Gameworld Experiences". Proceedings from the Advances in Computing Entertainment Conference (ACE) 2006.
- Engholm, Ida; Lisbeth Klastrup (2004). Digitale verdener. Copenhagen: Gyldendal.
- Klastrup, Lisbeth; Tosca, Susana (2004). Transmedial Worlds – Rethinking Cyberworld Design (PDF). IEEE. ISBN 0-7695-2140-1.
