= Espen Aarseth =

Norwegian academic (born 1965)

Espen J. Aarseth
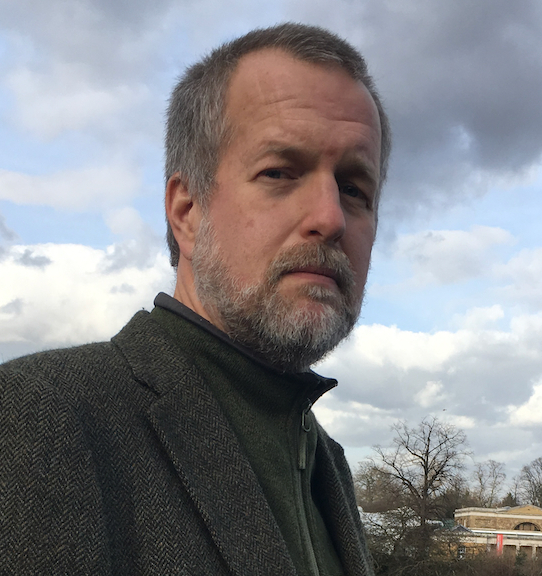
- Aarseth in 2022
- Born: 1965; Bergen

Academic background
- Education: University of Bergen, University of Copenhagen

Academic work
- Institutions: IT University of Copenhagen, University of Bergen
- Doctoral students: Sebastian Möring, Jill Walker Rettberg

Espen J. Aarseth (born 1965) is a Norwegian academic specializing in the fields of video game studies and electronic literature. Aarseth completed his doctorate at the University of Bergen. He co-founded the Department of Humanistic Informatics at the University of Bergen, and worked there until 2003, at which time he was a full professor.

Aarseth is currently chair professor of game studies and dean of the School of Creative Media at the City University of Hong Kong. He was previously a professor at and Head of the Center for Computer Games Research at the IT University of Copenhagen, and principal investigator of a €2 million ERC Advanced grant for the project Making Sense of Games. Aarseth is also the Editor in Chief of Game Studies, the oldest peer-reviewed journal in the field of game studies, and member of the advisory board of G|A|M|E, a journal of comparative videogame analysis.

== Cybertext ==
Aarseth's works include groundbreaking Cybertext: Perspectives on Ergodic Literature (Johns Hopkins UP 1997) book, which was originally his doctoral thesis. Cybertext focuses on mechanical organization of texts by placing the medium as a critical part of literary exchanges. The book introduces the concept of ergodic literature, which is a text that requires non-trivial effort to be traversed. The book also contains a well-known (pre-ludological) theory, "typology of cybertext" which allows ergodic texts to be classified by their functional qualities. (In Aarseth's later work with Solveig Smedstad & Lise Sunnanå this typology of cybertext transforms into "a multi-dimensional typology of games".)

== Non-linear media ==
Aarseth also wrote an article, "Nonlinearity and Literary Theory", which was published in Hyper/Text/Theory and The New Media Reader. The article discusses the concept behind nonlinear texts, stepping away from the category of hypertext and delving into different types of media which can also be considered nonlinear. He identifies nonlinear texts as objects of verbal communication in which the words or sequence of words may differ from reading to reading. He also outlines the different categories and varieties of nonlinear texts. Additionally, he talks about how writing is more than just signs and symbols. Writing can be broken down into two units which are called textons and scriptons. The essay also discusses hypertext fiction in depth as well as works of interactive fiction, such as Colossal Cave Adventure, and MUDs.
