= Data jam =

A data jam is a technically oriented workshop exercise where people solve problems using data sets. The events can produce visual data, analytics and applications.

Examples include the Hudson Data Jam, hosted by Cary Institute of Environmental Systems, in which students are asked to tell a story based on raw data collected from the watershed of the Hudson River and the Capitol Code, a data jam based on the Office of the Minnesota Secretary of State.

== See also ==
- Data and information visualization
- Game jam
- Hackathon
