= The Eye Tribe =

The Eye Tribe was a Danish startup that produced eye tracking technology and was selling it to software developers for them to incorporate the eye tracking device into their applications and programs. The Eye Tribe's software allowed users to control a smartphone, tablet, or computer using only their gaze. The company emphasized a compact and aesthetically streamlined design.

== History ==
Sune Alstrup Johansen (CEO), Javier San Agustin, Martin Tall (CTO), and Henrik Skovsgaard are the four founders of the company started in 2011. The founders met in 2006 at the IT University of Copenhagen. The four quickly found their ambition to create eye-tracking technology at an affordable cost, and soon took the rights and ownership for their ideas from the university where they were working and created their start-up company. The men named the company “Senseye”, until later changing their name to “The Eye Tribe”. The company started to take off in 2011 when The Eye Tribe participated in the European Startup Bootcamp accelerator program. After the StartupBootcamp, the company started to make its mark and become more well known, earning a spot in the “Cool Vendors in Human-Machine Interface, 2012” report by Gartner Inc. among five other companies. Later in 2012, The Eye Tribe received US$2.3 million from the Danish National Advanced Technology Foundation and another million from private European investors. The Eye Tribe is also leading a US$4.4 million government-funded project, making it the major project for developing eye tracking for hand-held devices. On December 12, 2016, The Eye Tribe sent an email to its customer list, informing them that they "decided to go in a different direction with their technology and stopped development of their products." On 29 December Facebook bought the company for its Oculus division in order to incorporate the technology in Vr gaming.

== Technology ==
As of October 2013, The Eye Tribe was getting ready to send out the first shipments of their eye tracking technology. The Eye Tribe has broken the record for smallest eye tracker device in the world, measuring in at 20 × 1.9 × 1.9 cm. Also, the eye tracker does not require a separate power source, making it even more portable. The device uses a USB 3.0 connection, which allows it to run with most computers and tablets. The Eye Tribe is compatible with Microsoft Windows 7 or newer and OS X, but the company is in the process of working on support for other major platforms, such as Android. They are selling the device to developers with a simple software development kit using C++, C# and Java programming platforms.

The main components of the Eye Tribe tracker are a camera and a high-resolution infrared LED, which can easily be set up in a cell phone or mobile device. The Eye Tribe's device uses a camera to track the user's eye movement. The camera tracks even the most minuscule of movements of the users’ pupils, by taking the images and running them through computer-vision algorithms. The algorithms read “on-screen gaze coordinates” and help the software to then determine where on the screen the user is looking. The algorithms also work with the hardware, camera sensor and light, to enhance the users’ experiences in many different kinds of light settings and environment, although the device works best indoors.

Before using the eye tracking device, a calibration is needed in order for the device to find a user's pupils and identify unique eye characteristics needed to help enhance the accuracy of tracking one's gaze. The tracker has an average accuracy of about 0.5 degree of visual angle and can identify and follow the movement of an eye with sub millimeter precision, which is around the size of a fingertip.

Sampling rate	30 Hz and 60 Hz mode
Accuracy	0.5° (average)
Spatial resolution	0.1° (RMS)
Latency	< 20 ms at 60 Hz
Calibration	5, 9, 12 points
Operating range	45 cm – 75 cm
Tracking area	40 cm × 30 cm at 65 cm distance
Screen sizes	Up to 24 inches
API/SDK	C++, C# and Java included
Data output	Binocular gaze data
Dimensions	(W/H/D) 20 × 1.9 × 1.9 cm (7.9 × 0.75 × 0.75 inches)
Weight	70 g
Connection	USB 3.0 Superspeed

== Uses ==
The Eye Tribe Company is developing eye-tracking technology with the goal that in the near future, smartphones, tablets, and computers will commonly uses its software. The company aims to make eye tracking technology, a standard household feature that will use everyday devices.

From their goals, The Eye Tribe makes it clear that they hope their technology will become versatile, used for many things from games to working, from browsing the web to security. A game most often used in their demos is Fruit Ninja, an app on most smart phones (used in iPhones and androids). The game uses a touch screen to slice fruit, but with eye tribe technology, the people would just look at the screen and use their gaze to play. Eye Tribe is currently working with other app designers to integrate their technology into other games for pleasure.

The Eye Tribe Company often demonstrates how their software works in their demos by showing someone scrolling down a web page by just staring at the screen. It exemplifies how the device can be hands-free when needed, making it easy and quick to read and browse the web. An example would be when you are watching a how-to video, you can pause it or rewind with your eyes, because your hands are too busy.

Another example of eye tracking is security. Users can set a gaze-operated password, where they would have to look at certain parts of the screen in order to unlock the device. Some would argue that this is a more efficient and secure way to lock their devices.

== Closing down ==
On December 12, 2016, The Eye Tribe sent the following email to their customers:

An Update From The Eye Tribe

Thank you for supporting The Eye Tribe and ordering the world’s first truly affordable eye tracker. It is customers like you that have helped us get to where we are today.

Unfortunately, we’ve decided to go in a different direction with our technology and will stop development of our products. We thought you should hear this news directly from us. We thank you for the time you’ve spent in discussions.

-The Eye Tribe Team

A similar email was sent to the users of their Eyeproof service: An Update From EyeProof

After several years of providing online eye tracking analysis, we are announcing that we are wrapping up EyeProof. On January 31st 2017 we will shut down our service and delete all data. No user data, account information, stimuli or recordings will be kept after this point.

We want to make this closing as smooth as possible for everyone who uses EyeProof. If you have an active account you are able to download all your data before the closing date. We kindly ask you to navigate to the export section, which can be found on the right-side panel, for each of your studies and manually export your data and screenshots. The EyeProof documentation has a section explaining the different fields for the raw data, fixations, AOIs and area transitions for each resource: http://beta.eyeproof.net/docs/#export

All the best and thank you for supporting EyeProof and contributing to the eye tracking community.

Happy tracking!

The EyeProof Team

There wasn't any further explanation provided as to the reason, or if any support would be available to those who already purchased their eye tracking device. After the announcement, the company's website (theeyetribe.com) was taken down, and email sent to their support bounced back. A slightly different version of the company website was put back online a few days later, lacking any mention of the company ceasing operations. Neither the blog nor the website has any mentions of the ceasing of operations the company's customers had been notified of, leaving some uncertainty about the company's status or future.

Acquisition

It was reported recently that Oculus VR (owned by Facebook) acquired Eye Tribe and all of the employees and assets.
