= Train Jam =

American game jam

Train Jam is an annual game jam that takes place aboard the Amtrak California Zephyr train, which travels from Chicago, Illinois, to Emeryville, California, on the days immediately preceding the Game Developers Conference in San Francisco.

There is no consistent Internet access aboard the train during the trip, which encourages a sense of community and teamwork amongst the participants. Past participants include prominent members of the indie game development community, such as Rami Ismail and Sean Vanaman. In addition to attracting professional and independent developers, train jam has a "student ambassador" program and has included students throughout every jam.

Train Jam was founded in 2014 by Adriel Wallick, and occurred every year up to 2019 at which point it was put on hold due to the COVID-19 pandemic. Readers can play past games made at train jam for free on various websites.

== Argentina ==
A similar event took place for the first time in Argentina on the Buenos Aires–Rosario–Córdoba high-speed railway from Buenos Aires to Córdoba on 2017. The covered distance is 710 km (440 mi) and is done in about 18hs. Two more editions happened in 2018 and 2019

In 2023 a similar event called "Democracy on rails" happened from Córdoba to Buenos Aires.
