= Indie Game Jam =

Video game industry event

The Indie Game Jam (IGJ) was an effort to rapidly prototype video game designs and inject new ideas into the game industry. Started in 2002 by a group of game designers-programmers, the event featured a shared game engine technology and worked on by other designer-programmers for a single long weekend. The games resulting from that weekend were then published, open-source, on the IGJ web page.

== Overview ==
IGJ was an event for indie game developers that allowed them to develop and present ideas without publisher restrictions. Hosted in Oakland, California just before the Game Developers Conference, the IGJ ran on sponsorship and donations.

IGJ was known for innovation and rapid prototyping of new gameplay ideas. After the third IGJ, Doug Church commented, "[..] it's kinda true that nothing works, but you just throw everyone into the middle of the fire and things come out." He commented that small experiments can lead to big developments in the field. He also noted that while IGJ may not itself revolutionize the mainstream video game industry, it may inspire individuals to innovate. Justin Hall explained that the "roots of electronic entertainment life [lie in such] collaborations".

Numerous well known indie developers and other game industry figures have participated, including Jonathan Blow, Doug Church, Chaim Gingold, Justin Hall, Chris Hecker, Austin Grossman, Marc LeBlanc, Randy Smith, and Robin Hunicke.

The IGJ was considered an inspiration for later game jams including the Nordic Game Jam and the Global Game Jam.

== Yearly Game Jams ==
Each year, Indie Game Jam posed different questions about innovation of new settings, genres, and controls.

- The first Indie Game Jam (IGJ) named "0th Indie Game Jam." was held between March 15–18, 2002. The idea for the event came from Chris Hecker and Sean Barrett, who originally presented Dogma 2001 challenge for the 2001 Game Developers Conference (GDC), which strived to create games without relying on technology. For the IGJ, the opposite approach was taken. Hecker described the attempt as encouragement for experimentation with technology-driven design and pointed out that video gaming industry lacked innovation being restricted by publisher expectations for returns. He proposed to use 100,000 sprites to produce a game. During the jam 12 new games were developed by 14 programmers and designers. All games used the same engine, which Hecker noted took considerable time to produce. The engine was optimized and strived to stress the hardware. He also noted that "great programmers" had to be chosen due to limited time and complex coding tasks. The resulting innovative games, while in no way complete, were presented at the Experimental Gameplay Workshop session at the 2002 GDC and were well received. The event was funded by donations: for example Intel supplied the team's personal computers.
- The second Indie Game Jam held in March 2003 used Zack Simpson's Shadow Garden technology, which used a human shadow projected on the wall as the primary interface. The IGJ again had 14 programmers and designers participating.
- The third Indie Game Jam was held in March 2004 and two dozen programmers participated. In the invitation letter, Hecker proposed to explore physics engine integration into gameplay. The engine chosen was Atman Binstock's 2D physics engine with a framework for experimentation with various physical properties and object interactions. The engine presented a challenge, because the real world physics did not necessarily correspond with the engine's features. The jam explored level deformation and chaotic results from player's interaction with the physics engine. It proved difficult to focus on game design rather than physics themselves. The jam also invited a number of support stuff and artists to polish the games. Almost all games produced used PlayStation 2 DualShock controllers. While unfamiliarity with the engine and certain technical difficulties provided a challenge, in the end the team succeeded at producing working games. In the end, the physics were seen as a field of potential innovation.
- The fourth Indie Game Jam held in March 2005 explored human interaction using 3D characters from The Sims. The IGJ attracted professionals from various fields – art, sound design, game theory and education. By this time, similar Game Jams had developed – in Lithuania, Toronto, Dallas, Boston, Ohio, and Nordic.
