= Game jam =

Video game production contest limited in time

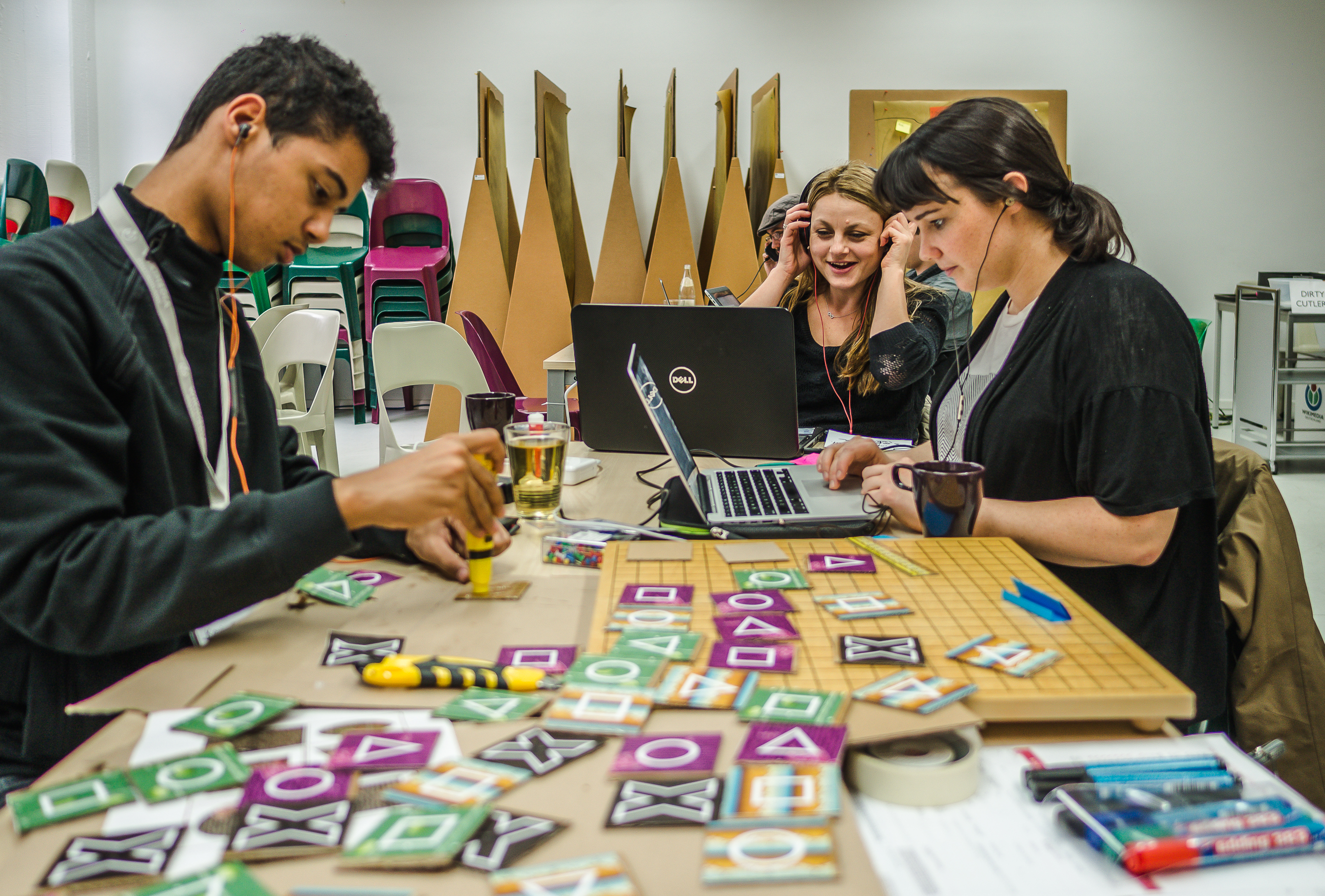
Participants in Free Knowledge Game Jam 2015

A game jam is an event where participants try to make a game, usually a video game, from scratch. Depending on the format, participants might work independently, or in teams. Event duration varies widely, commonly lasting 24, 48, or 72 hours, 1-2 weeks, or a full month. Participants are generally programmers, game designers, artists, writers, sound designers and others in game development-related fields. While many game jams are run purely as a game-making exercise, some game jams are contests that offer prizes. Submissions may later be released as fully-developed games.

Traditionally, game jams focus on video games; however, board games have also been the subject of game jams.

== History ==
The term game jam is a composition of the words game and jam session. A jam session describes the musical act of producing music with little to no prior preparation in an effort to develop new material or simply to practice. In the same way, game jams are events in which game developers prototype experimental ideas into playable games.

Prior to game jams, there were rapid creation challenge events such as the Interactive Fiction Competition starting in 1995 and a writing challenge NaNoWriMo from 1999.

The earliest known game jam is SpeedHack, which began in 1999 and ran until 2015. SizeHack 2000 is another early jam.

In March 2002, video game developers Chris Hecker and Sean Barrett, interested in the capability of modern hardware in rendering a large number of sprites, worked with Doug Church, Jonathan Blow, and Casey Muratori in developing a specialized game engine capable of rendering a massive number of sprites. Hecker and Barrett invited a small group of video game developers to meet in Hecker's office in Oakland, California for the purpose of creating innovative video games using this newly built engine. Hecker and Barrett named this gathering the 0th Indie Game Jam, a game design and programming event "designed to encourage experimentation and innovation in the game industry". This is the first documented use of the game jam name. Ludum Dare (since April 2002), and LT Game Jam (since August 2002) are other game jams that originate in this period. These 2002 game jams focused on the technology and the programmer. Many participants joined by themselves, and the Indie Game Jam and LT Game Jam required that the programmer use a custom game engine. Ludum Dare initially described itself a "competition" and now offers jams and competitions as distinguished events.

The Nordic Game Jam was first held in January 2006 and introduced the model with group forming and theme introduction prior to the jamming period. This would later be adopted and popularized by the Global Game Jam (since 2009), orienting game jams towards team collaboration. Game jams also became distributed or organized for a cause, examples being the Health Games Challenge (2010) and the Fukushima Game Jam (2012), respectively. Beginning with the Train Jam (2013), game jams joined the experience economy. At least 1290 game jams were held on itch.io by 2013.

== Format ==
=== Location ===
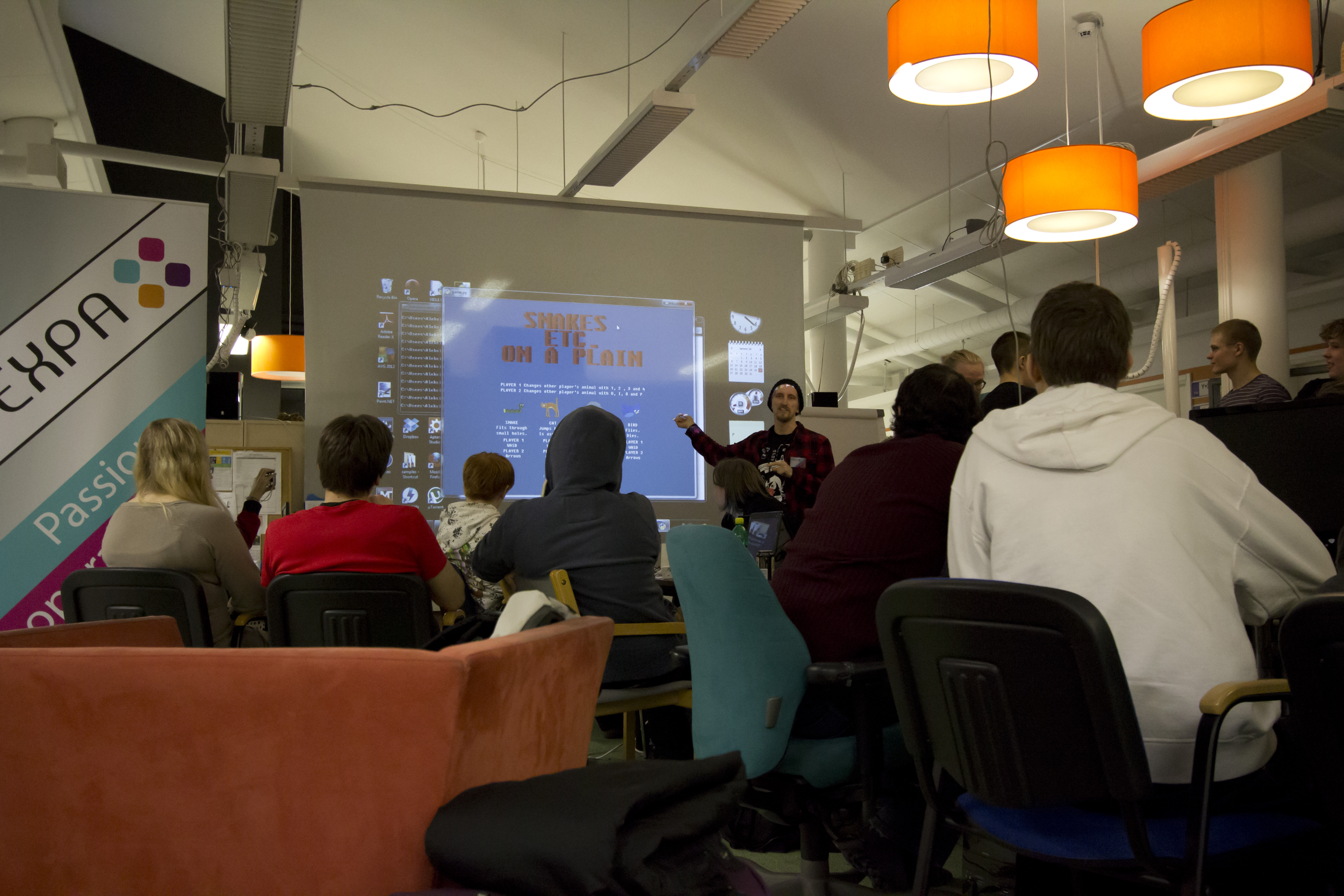
A finished game being presented at Global Game Jam 2014, Jyväskylä, Finland

Some game jams are local events, taking place in universities, conference halls, or other private spaces. The Global Game Jam takes place at the end of January every year, with over 800 locations in 100+ countries around the world. The Ludum Dare is an example of a virtual game jam, an event where participants largely remain at home, but present their efforts at the conclusion of the jam.

=== Time constraint ===
Game jams typically have restrictive time limits, ranging from a few hours to several days. This time constraint is meant to simulate the pressure of a deadline and to encourage creativity among ideas produced by game jam teams.

=== Theme ===
A game jam may be centered on a theme, which all games developed within the jam must adhere to. The theme is usually announced shortly before the event begins, in order to discourage participants from planning for the event beforehand and from using previously developed material. In addition, themes are meant to place restrictions on developers, which encourages creativity.

Ludum Dare 24, a competitive game jam event, featured the theme of "Evolution". As stated by the Ludum Dare rules, all participants in the competition were recommended to create a game based on this theme. However, the rules also stated that participants were not required to use the theme, which allowed for games to be made outside of the theme.

=== Technology ===
The type of technology can vary depending on the type of game being developed, and among the different disciplines involved.

In a video game jam, teams are generally made up of at least a programmer and an artist. A programmer builds using game development tools. It should allow rapid prototyping to meet the time constraint. An artist may use creative tools to produce the game assets, or they might use those that come with tools such as Scratch and Kodu Game Lab. Social media such as Facebook, Twitter, and GitHub are available for participants. These are inappropriate in the educational context of young students, where moderated game sharing functionality on websites of Scratch and Kodu may be used instead.

Non-digital game jams also exist. Board games and card games have also been the subject of game jams. At a game jam that was part of Stanford University’s 2013 Entrepreneurship Week, a team made a game that uses physical objects. Analogue game jams were tested at a few universities in the United Kingdom with positive reviews by the students and the staff alike.

== Purpose ==
Game jams are held for a variety of purposes. Lai et al. (2021) present the following taxonomy and examples:

- Challenge & technology – This aspect is similar to hackathons. Some definitions exclude competition-focused events from game jam, such as Grace (2016) and Ludum Dare, arguing that game jams emphasize the process over the product. However, it is not clear where the line should be drawn.
- Commercial game jams – In Amnesia Fortnight, teams build ideas with most votes by people. People vote and receive the prototype for a fee, making the event an example of commercial game jam. Game jams have also been held to promote products and companies.
- Experience economy – Game jams were held on train, sea, and air travels, and at locations such as cabins without ample water and electricity infrastructures and castles. These provide experiences unique to normal game development.
- Games industry commentary – Certain events in the industry have spawned game jams, such as removal of Flappy Bird leading to Flappy Jam.
- Meta – Some game jams comedically use the elements of game jams itself, such as the 0h Game Jam held during the last hour of European summer time, making the start and end times look the same.
- Part of other events – Some game jams were part of larger academic and industry meetings, including those of adjacent subjects such as at Ars Electronica.
- Purposeful game jams – Various organizations have held game jams as part of their movement, including climate, diversity, and cultural activism, and to raise attention to disasters and news.
- Regional affiliation
- Teaching & learning – Some game jams carry STEM themes to introduce them to under-represented groups. A survey also noted game jams as a way to teach game development career and social skills.

In classroom, game jams promote team work, creativity, planning, problem solving, and diversity. Educators may further mix social exercises such as "circle flap", "social ball", and "name gesture". Together with physical prototyping, they engage team communication.

Meanwhile, the participants joined game jams to learn skills, network with others, and have fun. A study found that participants improved their social skills after a game jam. The time dedication needed was often a reason for not attending a game jam for university students. Long-term programs that span over several weeks does not work well with their schedules.

== Games ==
Many games started as projects for game jams. For example, Surgeon Simulator 2013 was a submission for the 2013 Global Game Jam. From heartbeats as the event's theme, the developers conceptualized a heart transplant game with "quite challenging" physics and tools. The game quickly became popular following the release to the game jam. The popularity lead to a full version release on Steam. By April 2014, the game had more than 2.3 million Let's Play videos totaling more than 200 million views on YouTube. Baba Is You, which was made for the 2017 Nordic Game Jam, is another successful game with a game jam origin.

== See also ==
- Amnesia Fortnight
- BarCamp
- Competitive programming
- Demoparty
- GameMaker
- Game Off
- Global Game Jam
- Hackathon
- Indie Game Jam
- Js13kGames
- Ludum Dare
- Nordic Game Jam
- TOJam
- Train Jam
