= TOJam =

Game development event

Toronto Game Jam
- Location: Toronto, Canada
- Key people: Emily McGinley; Jim McGinley; Rob Segal

TOJam or Toronto Game Jam is an annual game development event held at George Brown College in Toronto, Canada each spring, usually the first weekend in May. The event is named for the common abbreviation for Toronto ("T.O."), and the term for an impromptu performance ("jam"), borrowed from jazz. The name of the event is knowingly evocative of "toe jam." The first TOJam event was held in May 2006. Among the organizers/co-founders were Emilie McGinley, Jim McGinley, Rob Segal and Nelson Yu.

== Event Structure ==
TOJam is a live event that takes place over the course of a single weekend from Friday to Sunday, although some events have offered developers earlier access starting Thursday. Participants are called "jammers" and come from a variety of backgrounds, including hobbyists, students, and professionals. They often participate at the event with their own equipment and supplies. Most attendees are adults, although some exceptions have been made for teenagers. Jammers enlist either solo or in teams. Some enlist as graphics or sound "floaters," lending their skills to a number of different teams, who sign up for their services on a waiting list. While the majority of participants attend the event in person, recent jams have accommodated virtual jammers, due to space limitations and geographical distance. Attendees are not limited to those from Toronto and have included Americans and Finnish participants.

Unlike other development events, TOJam is not a competition, but rather a period where game developers can focus their attention on a single project, with the goal of producing a finished, playable game by the end of the weekend. From the official kick-off Friday evening, jammers have 48 hours to complete their games before displaying them in an informal Sunday night showcase at the event's close.

== The TOJam Arcade ==
A follow-up event, the TOJam Arcade, is scheduled a month or more after the main TOJam event. Unlike the Sunday night showcase that is mainly intended for the jammers themselves, this event is open to the public. Scheduling allows jammers to fine-tune their games before presenting them to consumers, rather than creators, and it's usually held at a bar or pub in downtown Toronto.

At each Arcade event, attendees vote for their favorite games, which are awarded Gold, Silver, and Puce standards. These "winning" games receive priority placement on the TOJam website, even though the goal of the event is to facilitate completed games and to encourage unity across the Toronto game development community.

== Required elements ==
Each year, TOJammers are strongly encouraged to include a number of elements into their games. These elements have included:

- a splash screen indicating that the game was made at TOJam
- a recording of the TTC subway doors closing
- a picture of a goat on a pole, which may be rendered in a style of the developer's choosing

== History ==
When the Toronto Game Jam began, Toronto was not a recognized city for game development, as it was overshadowed by Vancouver and Montreal, where major studios like Electronic Arts and Ubisoft had settled. The event was first suggested by Nelson Yu, a developer-turned-writer, in the IGDA community boards as a way to get more local game development, in an attempt to retain talent. The first TOJam occurred in 2006.

Event	Date	Theme	Attendance	Playable Games
TOJam #1	May 5–7, 2006	N/A	35	10
TOJam #2	May 4–6, 2007	N/A	62	26
TOJam #3	May 9–11, 2008	Cheese	125	34
TOJam #4	May 1–3, 2009	Scale	87	37
TOJam #5	April 23, 2010	Missing	196	57
TOJam Sixy Times (#6)	May 13–15, 2011	What just happened?	260+	57
TOJam: The Sevening (#7)	May 11–13, 2012	The world's NOT ending	400+	Unknown
TOJam: Haters Gonna Eight' (#8)	May 3–5, 2013	Uncooperative	450+	Unknown
Party like it's 19TOJam9 (#9)	April 25–27, 2014	After YOU!	450+	105
TOJam: Tentacular (#10)	May 1–3, 2015	It's All Come to This	450+	100
TOJam: Don't Stop Beleven (#11)	May 6–8, 2016	There Will Be Consequences	450+	89
TOJam: What Twelves Below (#12)	May 5–7, 2017	Prepare for Disappointment	450+	102
TOJam: Flirteen with Danger (#13)	May 4–8, 2018	Winning is for Losers	625+	139
TOJam: Fourteen Favours the Bold (#14)	Planned for 2019, never occurred.	N/A	N/A	N/A
TOJam: Hindsight is 2020	May 8–10, 2020	Together But Apart	470	94
TOJam 2021: Feels Like a Re-run	May 14–16, 2021	Once more, With feeling!	432	93
TOJam 2022: All Twogether Now	May 13–15, 2022	That shouldn't be here	298	65
TOJam 2023: We Lost Count	May 26–May 28, 2023	You must leave it behind	321	62
TOJam 2024: Talk About Fourshadowing	May 10–May 12, 2024	It's supposed to do that		79
TOJam 2025: We're All Gettin' Out Alive!	May 9–May 11, 2025	The more you have, the worse it gets		98
TOJam 2026: Twenty Years, One Weekend	May 8–May 10, 2026 (Upcoming)	Mash-up any 2 previous themes	Pending	Pending

=== Awards ===
In the second, third, and fourth TOJam, a vote was held after the arcade section to decide the winners of the People's Choice awards. This was discontinued after the fourth TOJam.

Event	People's Choice Gold	People's Choice Silver	People's Choice Puce
TOJam #2	Xiq	Benny Hinn's Bible Blast for Cash	Quiver
TOJam #3	a game about bouncing	debugger	Seas of Cheese
TOJam #4	Category 5	Flock U	Cheese-ohol 2 Rosham Blaster
