= Noor Shaker =

Syrian-Danish computer scientist and entrepreneur

Noor Shaker نور شاكر
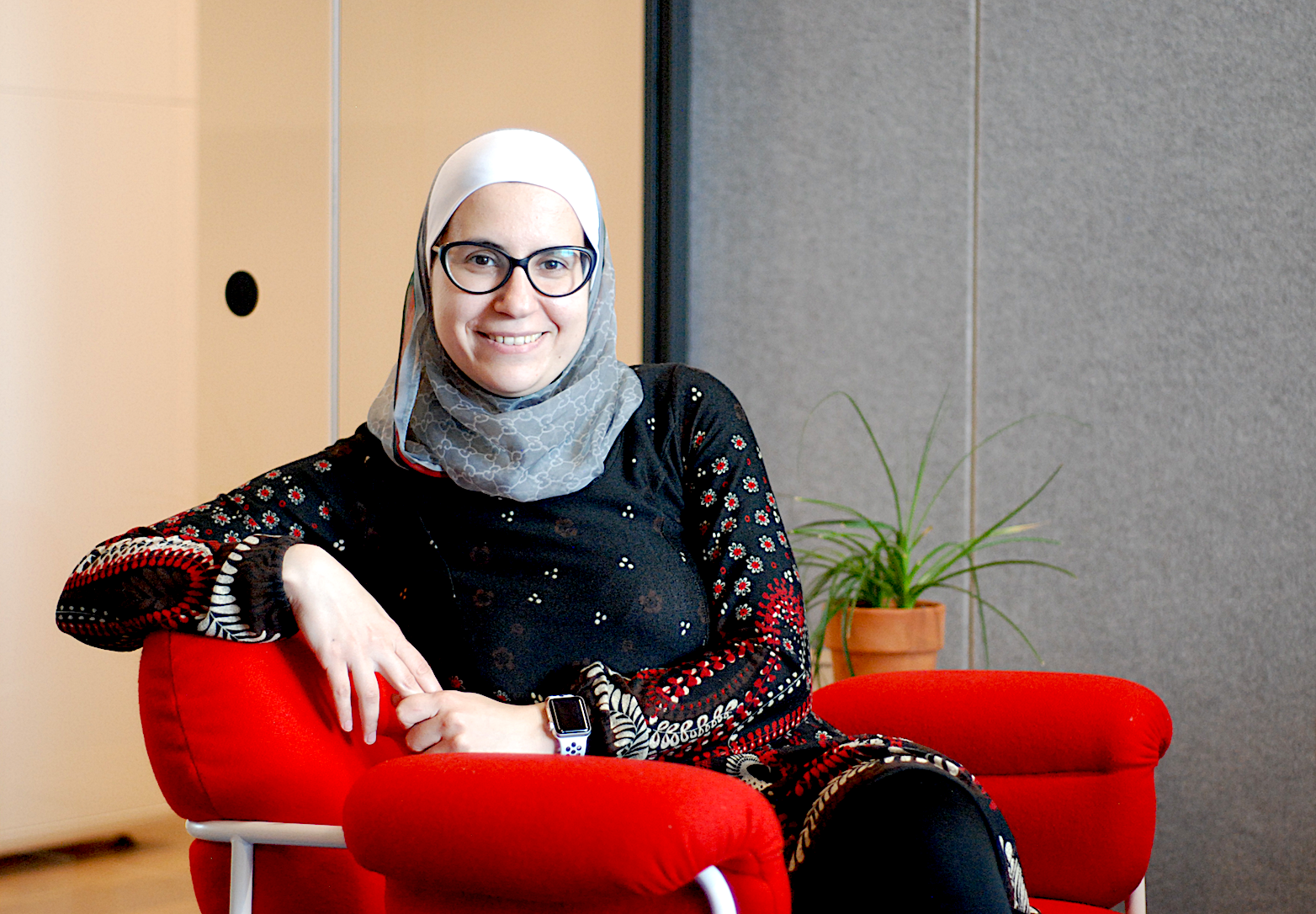
- Noor Shaker
- Education: B.Tech in Computer Science; Master's degree Ph.D
- Alma mater: University of Damascus; IT University of Copenhagen
- Occupations: entrepreneur and computer scientist

Noor Shaker (Arabic: نور شاكر) is a Syrian British entrepreneur and computer scientist specializing in the application of artificial intelligence to drug discovery and medical diagnostics. She is the founder and CEO of SpatialX, a company applying AI to pathology to improve cancer diagnostics. Previously, she co-founded the AI for drug discovery start-up Glamorous AI. Glamorous AI was acquired by the US-based company X-Chem in Nov 2021. Before Glamorous AI, Noor founded the drug discovery start-up GTN Ltd and was CEO for more than two years. In 2018, she received a CogX UK Rising Star Award from Prime Minister Theresa May for "AI technology that will transform drug discovery to treat chronic diseases".

== Career ==
Shaker studied for a bachelor's degree in computer science at the University of Damascus, Syria, specialising early on in artificial intelligence studies. Her work there included the development of Arabic incorporation into the Speech Synthesis Markup Language for speech-to-text software. She moved to Belgium for her master's degree at KU Leuven, specialising in artificial intelligence. In 2009 she moved to Denmark to study a PhD and continue as a postdoc in machine learning at the IT University of Copenhagen. She remained in Copenhagen for several years, being appointed an assistant professor at Aalborg University in 2016. Her research focused on the use of machine learning in affective computing and video games. This extended to co-organising competitions to produce AIs which could tackle video games or generate new levels to fit the user, most notably using Super Mario. During her professorial career she co-wrote a textbook titled "Procedural Content Generation in Gaming" and authored over thirty academic publications.

In 2017 Shaker co-founded GTN Ltd (Generative Tensorial Networks), a startup aiming to combine quantum computing and AI for drug discovery. Shaker stepped down from her role as CEO of the company in August 2019. The company entered liquidation in March 2020. The company aimed to combine machine learning techniques and quantum physics simulations in order to predict better therapeutics for medical use. Combining artificial intelligence with quantum models of published molecular structures may prove a novel and effective method to predict binding partners to disease regulators.

In 2020, she started her third venture, the London based start-up Glamorous AI. The company is a continuation of the journey she started earlier aiming at developing innovative solutions in drug discovery. The company aims at integrating experts chemistry knowledge with advanced ML to enable rapid discovery of new chemical entities of desired properties. Shaker and Glamorous AI have established relationships within academia, such as Cardiff University to discover possible COVID-19 drugs using Glamorous AI's platform, RosalindAI. In Nov 2021, GlamorousAI was acquired by the US company X-Chem for an undisclosed amount to bring AI capabilities to preclinical drug discovery. Shaker served as the Senior Vice President and General Manager of X-Chem's London office. After her tenure at X-Chem, Shaker founded SpatialX in late 2023 to apply artificial intelligence to computational pathology. The company's stated mission is to improve cancer diagnostics and treatment by empowering pathologists with advanced AI tools. Shaker is an advisory panel member for Artificial Intelligence and Informatics in Rosalind Franklin Institute.

She has received several accolades, including being named one of the Top 100 Asian Stars in UK Tech 2021. One of the BBC 100 Women in 2019. A'Rising Star' among BioBeat's 2018 list of 50 Movers and Shakers in BioBusiness. Representing GTN, she was awarded a CogX UK Rising Star Award in 2018 for her innovative AI techniques for drug discovery and success in securing seed funding and prestigious collaborations.

Shaker is often a speaker at AI events (including those aimed at women in the industry) and chairs the Institute of Electrical and Electronics Engineers Computational Intelligence: Games Technical Committee.

== Awards and honours ==
- 2013: IEEE Transactions on Computational Intelligence and AI in Games Outstanding Paper Award for ‘Crowd-sourcing the Aesthetics off Platform Games’.
- 2018: Innovators Under 35 by MIT Technology Review
- 2018: 50 Movers and Shakers in BioBusiness by BioBeat
- 2018: Rising Star by CogX
- 2019: BBC 100 Women
- 2021: Top 100 Asian Stars in UK Tech 2021
