= Js13kGames =

Game jam competition

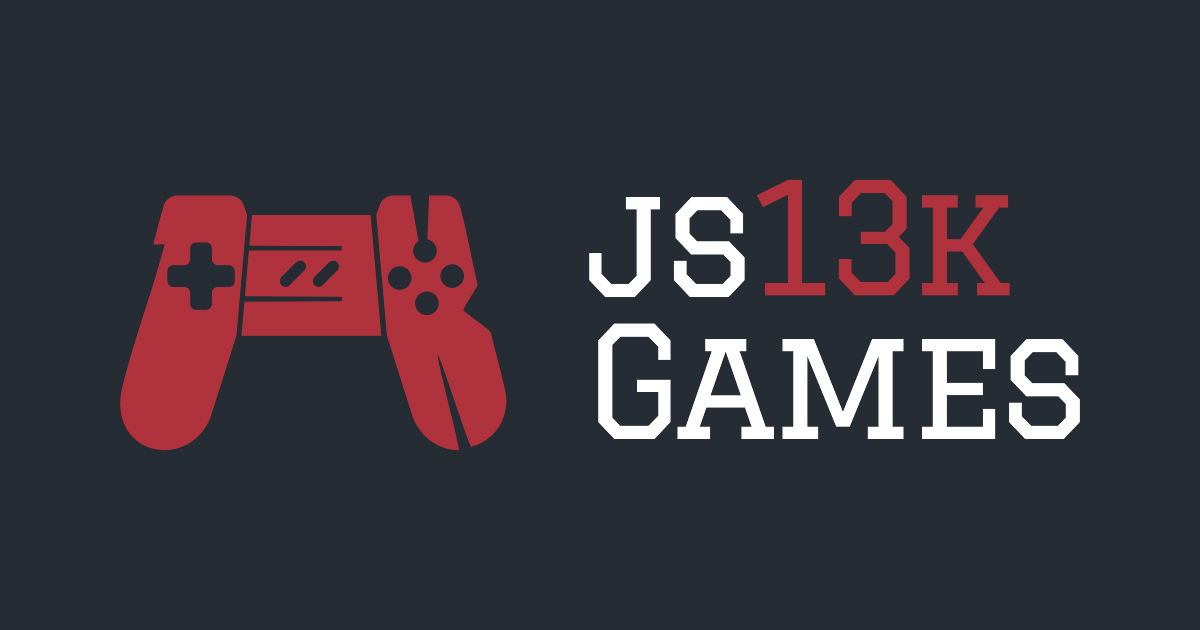
Js13kGames Logo

js13kGames (also referenced as JS13K) is a game jam competition, focused on creating browser games that are no larger than 13 kilobytes when compressed using ZIP. Participants are not permitted to use external services or libraries, and all assets must also fit within the size limit. Games are programmed in JavaScript and HTML5. The competition has a different theme each year and participants have the freedom to interpret it however they like. Winners receive prizes consisting of money, digital rewards, T-shirts, and promotional items.

== History ==
JS13K was founded in 2012 and is run by Andrzej Mazur. It is held from 13 August to 13 September annually. Since 2017 there are categories that allow for certain frameworks to not count towards the size limit. JS13k introduced a web monetization category in 2019 in partnership with Coil, which continued through 2020 funded partially by Grant for the Web.

Several well known game designers have participated in JS13K including Markus "Notch" Persson (creator of Minecraft) and Ricardo "Mrdoob" Cabello (creator of Three.js). Some games created for the competition have later been released commercially on Steam including 2016 winner Evil Glitch. Others have been mentioned across the internet in various articles around the event itself.

In 2015, JS13K started to expand, including a panel of judges for each of their events. There are a few judges that have been featured in every single event, including Dann Sullivan of Pocket Gamer, Game Developer Christer Kaitilla, and Games Journalist Jupiter Hadley.

In 2024, Brendan Eich, the creator of JavaScript, appreciated one of the participants for their competition entry.

== Results ==
No.	Year	Theme	Entries	Winning Game	Developer(s)	Ref
1	2012	Number 13	62	SpacePi	Jack Rugile	
2	2013	Bad Luck	70	Radius Raid	Jack Rugile	
3	2014	Earth, Water, Air and Fire	129	Pest Control : Weasels	Siorki	
4	2015	Reversed	160	Behind Asteroids — The Dark Side	Greweb	
5	2016	Glitch	127	Evil Glitch	Agar3s	
6	2017	Lost	253	Greeble	Ryan Malm	
7	2018	Offline	273	UNDERRUN	Phoboslab	
8	2019	Back	245	xx142-b2.exe	Ben & Salvatore	
9	2020	404	227	Ninja vs EVILCORP	Rémi Vansteelandt	
10	2021	Space	223	Space Garden	Ryan Malm	
11	2022	Death	167	Dante	Salvatore Previti	
12	2023	13th Century	163	Path to Glory	Rémi Vansteelandt	
13	2024	Triskaidekaphobia	187	13th Floor	Rob Louie	
14	2025	Black Cat	197	CLAWSTRIKE	Rémi Vansteelandt	
