= Dark Room Sex Game =

2008 video game

- Developer: Students at the IT University of Copenhagen for the Nordic Game Jam
- Platforms: Windows, Mac OS
- Release: February 2008
- Modes: Single-player, multiplayer

Dark Room Sex Game is a rhythm-oriented party video game released in February 2008 for Windows and MacOS. It was designed and developed by a team of seven students of various nationalities. Subtitled "Can I touch your Wiimote?", it is presented as a sex game without graphics. The game runs on a fully black screen, and the gameplay is based solely on sound information and haptics. A player needs to find a rhythm with their partner, and gradually accelerate to a target frequency, representing the orgasm. The game is playable with a keyboard or the Wiimote, and supports up to four players.

Dark Room Sex Game was developed by students at the IT University of Copenhagen for the Nordic Game Jam in 2006. It was a competition of developing a game in a weekend, with the theme "Taboo." The basic idea of the team is that "a play on the most erotic sex would be so devoid of any visual, forcing players to use their imagination". The game received positive reviews from the press, saying that the judge was "very fun." It is considered an interesting title for the evolution of video games, because of its unique approach to sex in the gameplay. It won several awards, including the IndieCade 2008.

== Gameplay ==
Dark Room Sex Game is a rhythm-oriented party game about sex, completely devoid of graphics, due to it running on a completely black screen. The game's menu consists entirely of sound: a voice gives information about the game and sets out the possible choices, with selections made via a keyboard. Three game modes are possible for one, two or four players. Six different voices are programmed into the game, but it is possible to define new ones. In each game, a voice is assigned randomly to each player. It is therefore possible to have a party with the voices of people of the same sex.

The goal of the game is to find a rhythm with the other player, and accelerate gradually until reaching orgasm. Players using the keyboard must press the keys on the numeric keypad, while those using a Wiimote must shake the controller following the rhythm. In the absence of graphics, players can only base their actions on the audio cues, in the form of lustful moans, and if necessary on the vibrations of the Wiimote. The game is divided into three distinct phases of the game. First is the phase known as "warm-up" match preliminaries. The second and third phases are more intense. Each voice has for each phase of the game five "positive" sounds, used when the rhythm is good; and the "negative" ones for when the rate is too high. There are also three orgasm sounds for each one of the voices available.

== Development ==
Dark Room Sex Game was developed during the 2008 edition of Nordic Game Jam, an open competition where participants develop and produce a video game in the space of 48 hours. It was held from 1 to 3 February 2008 at the IT University of Copenhagen in Denmark, and attracted 150 participants. This edition's theme around which games were meant to be developed was "Taboo", with several other minor constraints imposed: the game had to be playable with a controller, support multiplayer and have a core game loop with a victory and a high score.

The original game idea by Lau Korsgaard was to perform an erotic game devoid of graphics. He shared this vision with game developer Douglas Wilson and five other students who joined the project: Dajana Dimovska, Kennett Wong, Lars Bojsen-Møller, Mads Lyngvig and Robin Di Capua.

The game was originally intended to be played with a keyboard only, but the team was later inspired by the phallic shape and vibration features of the Wiimote. The team decided that this controller allowed to get a "dynamic of people looking at each other, not the screen, and also a certain about of physicality". However, the team does not consider that the Wii version is "better" than the other. The keyboard version forces players to be pressed close to each other, making this version more provocative in some aspects.

The game was developed in Java, under the development environment Eclipse. The sound aspect operates on the software library FMOD. Interfacing with the Wiimote was the most difficult technical development. The connection with the Wiimote interface is made with a homebrew called "WiiRemoteJ API." The Bluetooth connection is managed by a free library.
