= SpyParty =

2018 video game

- Developers: Chris Hecker, John Cimino
- Publisher: Chris Hecker
- Artists: John Cimino, Reika Yoshino
- Engine: Custom
- Platforms: Windows, OS X
- Release: April 12, 2018; (Steam Early Access)
- Genre: Stealth
- Mode: Multiplayer

SpyParty is a social deduction stealth video game developed by Chris Hecker. SpyParty was first shown at the Experimental Gameplay Workshop at the 2009 Game Developers Conference. Hecker describes his game as "an asymmetric multiplayer espionage game, dealing with the subtlety of human behavior, character, personality, and social mores, instead of the usual spy game explosions and car chases".

== Gameplay ==
A spy attempting to complete a mission

A round of SpyParty is played between two players, one of whom is designated "the spy" while the other is designated "the sniper". The spy must attempt to blend in with a number of non-playing characters within a high-society cocktail party setting while completing a pre-determined number of espionage missions (such as planting a bug on a character designated “the ambassador”, or communicating a code phrase to a double agent known to both players) within a time limit. The sniper, who is viewing the party from the outside and does not know which avatar is the spy, must observe all of the characters to deduce which one it is. The sniper wins the round if they identify the spy and shoot them or if the spy runs out of time without finishing their missions. The spy wins the round if they complete all of their missions or if the sniper shoots any character other than the spy.

Sniper gameplay

Hecker has stated that there will be modes beyond the current two-player Spy vs. Sniper game in the future once the core game design is complete.

== Development ==
Development of SpyParty began in 2009. Signups for an invite-only closed beta opened in May 2011. Beta access for the public opened in June 2013.

To help with the illustrations in the game, John Cimino joined the SpyParty team in September 2011 and the updated artwork was revealed to the public the following year on SpyParty's official website.

In early October 2013, Hecker and Cimino released new character and environment art to the open beta. This included five new playable characters and one new level, "Modern". Chris Hecker uses the words "illustrative" and "timeless" to describe the new art style and has stated a goal of being "the most diverse game ever". As of October 2016, there are 21 characters available for players.

A February 2014 update added replays to the game. The feature was designed to help new players improve their skills.

Despite claiming in March 2010 that the game would be released in two years, Hecker has not provided a release date for the final product, apart from a somewhat humorous tweet saying the game is still another two years away from completion in March 2013. In late 2017, the developer announced that an early access release on Steam was coming in early 2018. He later announced that the game early access would be available on Steam on April 12.
