= Machineers =

- Machineers Steam banner
- Developer: Lohika Games
- Publisher: Lohika Games
- Designer: Henrike Lode
- Composer: Michael Fischerson
- Engine: Unity 3D
- Platforms: iPad iPhone; Android
- Release: WW: 9 October 2014
- Genre: Puzzle Adventure
- Mode: Single-player

Machineers is a puzzle adventure game which tasks players with fixing twelve fantasy machines using mechanical parts such as gears, belts and wires. The player takes on the role of Zola - a new intern working for Hayden's Repair Shop in Tivoli Town. Machineers is an episodic game, with Episode 1 being released on 9 October 2014, and Episode 2 released on 12 April 2015.

== Gameplay ==
Using point and click adventure game interactions, players walk around the town interacting with the robot townsfolk and each gives the player a puzzle in the form of a machine to fix. Each puzzle serves as a lesson aiming to teach the player how to use a puzzle mechanic in preparation for the sandbox Vehicle Workshop, where players can build a car in a configuration of their choosing and drive it around a track. Around the town are a variety of objects the player can interact with and learn about to explore the lore of the world.

== Development ==
Machineers began as a Master's thesis at the IT University of Copenhagen as a puzzle game designed to teach programming to children, a topic that CEO and developer Henrike Lode has spoken about at conferences. Machineers was developed as an exploration of stealth learning in Educational Technology in order to teach logical thinking and programming skills through using the mechanical parts as metaphors for programming concepts. As such, knobs are used as variable setters, translated through a wire to a different method and a receiver that acts as a switch statement.

== Reception ==
Machineers was positively received by several gaming review websites, such as KILLSCREEN and Pocket Gamer.

Machineers was a winner at the 2012 Serious Games Showcase and Challenge.

Winner of the Games For Purpose category, Conference on Human Factors in Computing Science 2013, Paris, France.

Awarded funding from the Nordic Game Program at Nordic Game conference in Malmo, Sweden in 2014.
