= Center for Computer Games Research =

Danish research center

Coordinates: 55.6593°N 12.5912°E

The Center for Computer Games Research is located at the IT University of Copenhagen, Denmark and was one of the first academic departments entirely dedicated to the scholarly study of digital gaming. Originally a part of the Department of Digital Aesthetics and Communication and spun off into its own independent unit in 2003, the Center was notable at the time for its sole specialization in gaming. It has historically been a multidisciplinary unit with faculty from fields ranging from literature to sociology to computer science. It has hosted a number of key conferences over the years including Other Players (2004), the 2005 iteration of the Digital Arts and Culture conference, and the IEEE Conference on Computational Intelligence and Games in 2010.

It continues to provide institutional support to the peer-reviewed journal Game Studies, which launched in 2001 (the editor-in-chief, Espen Aarseth, is former head of the Center and current Professor at the ITU).

The Center played a significant role for a number of important game studies scholars and designers. In addition to being the intellectual home for the university's Masters Program in Gaming, the Center has produced a number of PhD's over the years including scholars who have gone on to do major work in the field (see below).

Researchers affiliated with the Center include (current and former):

- Espen Aarseth
- T. L. Taylor
- Miguel Sicart
- Lisbeth Klastrup
- Susanna Tosca
- Jesper Juul
- Gonzalo Frasca
- Simon Egenfeldt-Nielsen
- Georgios N. Yannakakis
- Julian Togelius
- Mark Nelson
- Katherine Isbister
- Emma Witkowski
- Douglas Wilson
- Martin Pichlmair
- Sebastian Risi
