= Nordic Game Jam =

Annual game jam

- Abbreviation: NGJ
- Formation: 2006, with first Nordic Game Jam held January 27–January 29, 2006
- Location: Copenhagen
- Official language: English/Danish
- Parent organization: International Game Developers Association Denmark
- Website: www.nordicgamejam.com

Nordic Game Jam is an annual game jam that takes place in Copenhagen, created in 2006 by Gorm Lai and the Danish chapter of the International Game Developers Association in collaboration with Jesper Juul (the IT University of Copenhagen) and Henriette Moos (Diginet Øresund). It is one of the biggest videogame-related events in Denmark and one of the largest game jams in the world, with 900 participants as of 2016. Participants are given a theme or series of restrictions at the beginning of the event and are then given around 40 hours to make a game around those. In 2009 it served as the flagship game jam and inspiration for Global Game Jam.

== Participants ==
Participants in the Nordic Game Jam come from several Nordic countries as well as other countries around the world. People of all skill levels and from various fields are welcome, such as game designers, programmers, sound designers, graphic artists or simply those interested in learning how to make games.

Before the jam begins, participants are given some time to meet and form teams, encouraging partnering with new people. Afterwards the theme and restrictions for that year are released and the countdown begins.

== Past events ==
=== 2006 ===
The first Nordic Game Jam was held from January 27–29, 2006, at the IT University of Copenhagen. During the jam, 40 participants created 8 games in 48 hours.

=== 2007 ===
In February 2007 the number of participants doubled to 80 with a total of 12 games created.

=== 2008 ===
For 2008 the number of participants increased to the point of becoming the biggest game jam in the world at its time, with 150 participants and 19 games, including Dark Room Sex Game. The main theme for 2008 was "Taboo" and three constraints: the game had to loop, had to be playable with a controller and was required to be multiplayer.

=== 2009 ===
In 2009 Nordic Game Jam became the flagship for the Global Game Jam, which started that same year during the same time. Chairman of the IGDA Education Special Interest Group Susan Gold organized an initiative with Ian Schreiber and Gorm Lai to have game jams around the globe in the same way as the Nordic Game Jam and with Nordic Game Jam as flagship, inspiration and model. Heather Kelley was hosted as the keynote speaker. A total of 157 participants took part in the jam and made around 29 games.

=== 2010 ===
For 2010 Nordic Game Jam brought the at the time Microsoft Game Studios Creative Director Peter Molyneux as keynote speaker and member of the jury.

=== 2011 ===
In 2011 Greg Costikyan was the keynote speaker.

=== 2012 ===
For 2012 Senior Designer at BioWare Manveer Heir gave that year's keynote speech. A total of 350 participants attended that year.

=== 2013 ===
The 2013 edition of Nordic Game Jam however brought several changes. Besides taking place in a new venue (Aalborg University in Copenhagen), it was also moved one week ahead of the Global Game Jam, separating itself from the global competition to allow participants to go to both Nordic Game Jam and a Global Game Jam event elsewhere the week after. The keynote speakers were Dennaton and Vlambeer. The winning game was Spaceship with a Mace by Nifflas The event attracted a total of 470 participants.

=== 2014 ===
In 2014, Nordic Game Jam took place at Aalborg University Copenhagen again and had John Polson as the keynote speaker. The event had a total of 570 participants, and 110 games were created around the theme of privacy.

=== 2015 ===
In 2015, the Nordic Game Jam hosted Steve Swink as the Keynote Speaker. The jam grew to more than 700 people, and centered around the theme: Obvious. The winning game was called "The Wuuuuuuu" – as it was controlled only by shouting into a microphone, all the jammers played it together during the final presentations.

=== 2016 ===
The 2016 edition hosted over 900 participants and created 182 games. The keynote speech was held by Kevin Martens & Jesse MacCree from Blizzard, the theme was "Leak" (and therefore, was revealed before the jam), and the winning game was "Random Access Murder". The jam again took place at the Aalborg University Copenhagen, but the Award Ceremony was moved to Imperial Cinema.

=== 2017 ===
In 2017 the jam changed the location – it took place at Docken, Copenhagen. On 21–23 April 2017, 700 participants created 144 games under a theme 'Not there'. The winner of the jam was "Baba Is You" by Hempuli. Kelly Wallick, Founder of Indie Megabooth, was the keynote speaker.

=== 2018 ===
In 2018 the jam changed location again – it took place at TAP1, Copenhagen. On 13–16 April 2018, 700 participants created 86 games under the theme 'Breaking Point'. The winner of the jam was "ON-LINE" by Peter Witt, Ronnie Vilhelmsen, Przemysław Krowiński, Jesper Helleskov Sørensen, Jens Peter Larsen, and Elie Abraham. The keynote was done by Robin Hunicke.

=== 2019 ===
In 2019, the Nordic Game Jam hosted Heather Kelley as the keynote speaker for a second time. It was held at KADK (The Royal Danish Academy of Fine Arts Schools of Architecture, Design and Conservation), Copenhagen.

=== 2020 ===
In 2020 the jam was again supposed to have been at KADK (The Royal Danish Academy of Fine Arts Schools of Architecture, Design and Conservation), Copenhagen. But due to COVID-19, the jam was postponed.

An online jam was held during the original weekend.

=== 2021 ===
In 2021, an online jam was held, managed through the Nordic Game Jam Discord server.

=== 2022 ===
In 2022, the jam was once again physical, and returned to Aalborg University Copenhagen. 400 participants attended, creating games based on themes printed on paper flowers that each participant picked randomly. The jam also featured a challenge to create physical-and-digital games with the aid of LEGO elements. Additionally, this edition did not feature a contest, voting, or winners. The keynote speaker was Alitt Khaliq, from Unity Technologies.

=== 2023 ===
The jam was once again held in Aalborg University Copenhagen, with a total of 500 participants attending. 87 games were created, pushing the cumulative total of games created in the history of Nordic Game Jam over the 1000-game milestone. The LEGO challenge and the lack of a contest from the previous year continued on to this edition. The keynote speakers were Osama Dorias from Blizzard Entertainment and Anita Sarkeesian.

=== 2024 ===
The jam returned to Aalborg University in Copenhagen once more, and again was sold out with 500 attendees and 96 games delivered at the end of the weekend. The theme was based on the MDA Framework and split into three: a Mechanic theme ("Reflection"), a Dynamic one ("Keeping Secrets"), and an Aesthetic one ("Sense of Belonging"). Jammers could choose one, or combine two or three. The keynote speaker was Mark Brown, from the popular YouTube channel Game Maker's Toolkit.

=== 2025 ===
The game jam was once again hosted at Aalborg University in Copenhagen, and again was sold out with over 500 attendees and 108 games delivered at the end of the weekend. The theme was "Eat vs Sleep" and marked the 20th Nordic Game Jam held since it started in 2006. The keynote speaker was Asbjørn 'Brackeys' Thirslund.

=== 2026 ===
Nordic returned to the Copenhagen venue of Aalborg University, and hosted around 650 people, with 129 games submitted. The theme was "Nothing", and it was chosen right before the beginning of the jam using a mini quiz that involved asking rapid-fire questions to the audience, then voting (by rounds of applause) for the most appealing theme. The keynote speaker was Rami Ismail.
