= Ida Engholm =

Ida Engholm (born 1965) is a professor of design theory and design history at the Royal Danish Academy. She is the author of several books on design and design thinking, including Design for the New World: From Human Design to Planet Design and Quick Guide to Design Thinking. Ida Engholm is a member of the Danish Design Council and an alumna of the now defunct Danish Centre for Design Research.

== The Fifth Dimension ==
The Fifth Dimension in design is a concept introduced by Ida Engholm in her book Design for the New World: From Human Design to Planet Design. In this concept, she proposes an expansion of design theorist Richard Buchanan's term ‘The Four Orders of Design’ to describe the evolution of design. According to Buchanan's model, design has evolved from graphic design through product design to the design of interactions, services, and experiences, and ultimately to the highest level—new forms that have emerged in recent years, such as system design encompassing organizations, business sectors, and policies. These diverse areas together define the complex field of contemporary design, all oriented towards meeting human desires and needs. Ida Engholm suggests adding a fifth order; a fifth dimension where design addresses the hyper-complexity of challenges on a planetary scale. This new dimension encompasses global ecosystems, integrating the four previous orders while highlighting that in the Anthropocene era, no human activity can be considered independently of the ecosystem it impacts. Therefore, Engholm argues, we must continuously focus on our planetary impact and our individual and collective responsibilities for the global environment in all our actions and imaginings.

=== Reception ===
In a 2023 review of the book Design for the New World: From Human Design to Planet Design, associate professor, Niels Peter Skou writes: "To me, the strength of the book lies in its precise identification of the way the Anthropocene and the development of the concept of design raise fundamental questions about design’s role and responsibility, and one can only have respect for the impressive amount of knowledge that is synthesized in the book and the author’s willingness to think about it in relation to practice."
