= Tiimo =

Mobile app

- Operating system: Web; macOS; iOS
- Type: Productivity; Task management
- License: Freemium
- Website: www.tiimoapp.com

Tiimo is an app designed to help neurodivergent individuals with planning their life. In August 2024 the company raised €1.4 million, bringing their total funding to €4.3 million. At that point they had over 500,000 users, including 50,000 paid users. The app has Apple Watch support and a learning platform that includes courses on well-being and neurodiversity. The app was founded by Helene Lassen Nørlem and Melissa Würtz Azari in 2015. After being a finalist in 2024, in December 2025 Tiimo was won Apple’s iPhone App of the Year. The premium version is $10/mo and features an AI chatbot alongside the daily planner.
