= Jill Walker Rettberg =

Norwegian digital culture scholar

Jill Walker Rettberg cand.philol., dr.art.
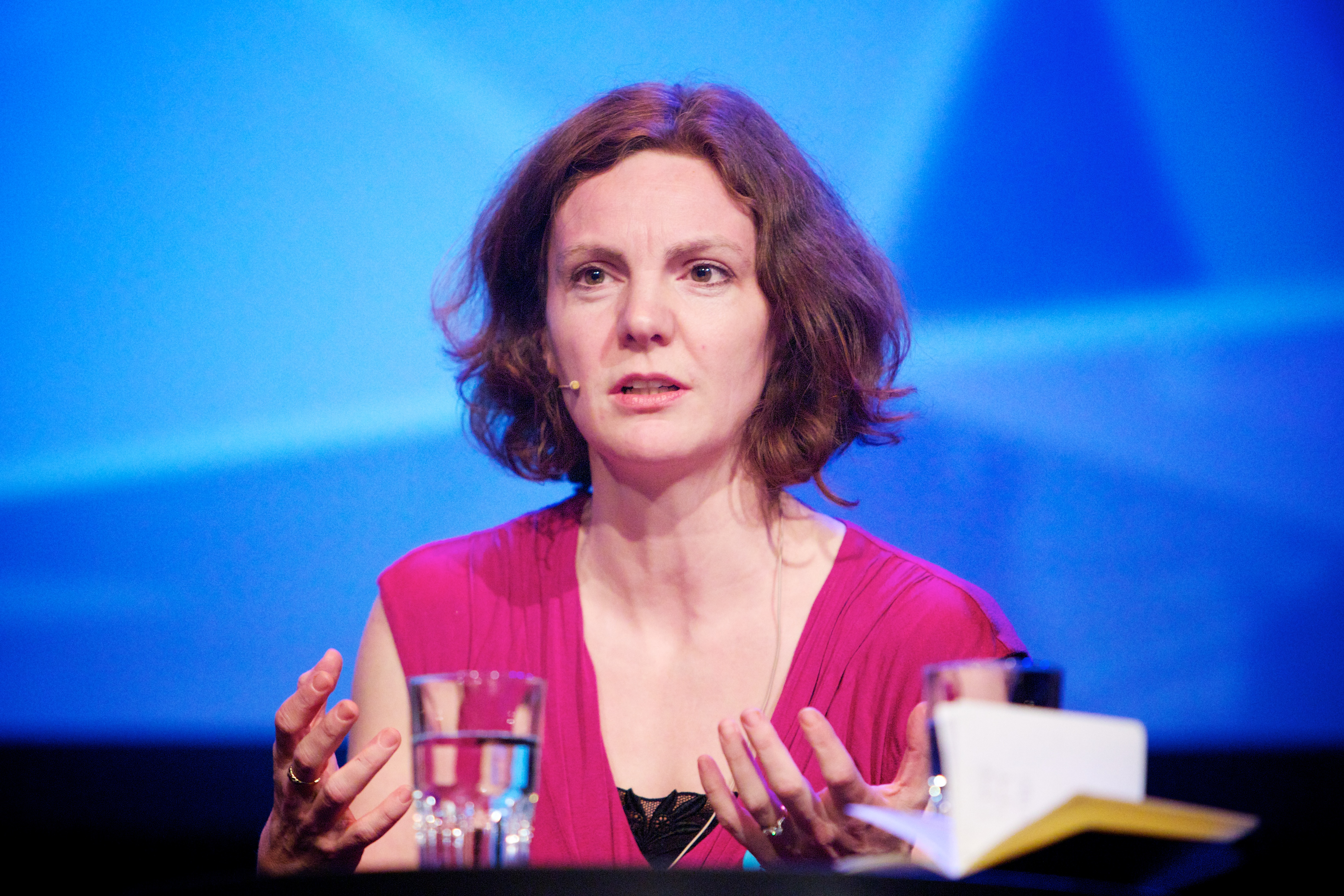
- Rettberg at a panel debate at Nordiske mediedager in 2011
- Born: 1971 (age 54–55)
- Other name: Jill Walker
- Known for: blogging, social media, digital narratives
- Scientific career
- Fields: Internet studies, Digital humanities, Science and Technology Studies
- Workplaces: University of Bergen
- Thesis: Fiction and interaction how clicking a mouse can make you part of a fictional world (2004)
- Website: jilltxt.net

Jill Walker Rettberg (born Jill Walker in 1971) is co-director of the Center for Digital Narrative and Professor of Digital Culture at the University of Bergen. She is Principal Investigator on an ERC Advanced Grant on AI-generated stories (2024-2029), and previously led an ERC Consolidator Grant on machine vision (2018–2023). She is also known for her research on self-representation in social media, and for research dissemination in social media, having started her research blog jill/txt in 2000, and developed Snapchat Research Stories in 2017.

== Education and academic career ==
After completing an MA in Comparative Literature at the University of Bergen in 1998, Rettberg worked for a year on a research project developing educational MOOs, and in 2003 completed a doctoral degree in Humanistic Informatics at the University of Bergen under the supervision of Espen Aarseth.

Rettberg was hired as an associate professor at the University of Bergen after her PhD, and was promoted to full Professor of Digital Culture in 2009. In addition to her tenured position at the University of Bergen, Rettberg has been a visiting scholar at the Royal Melbourne Institute of Technology, University of Illinois Chicago, Massachusetts Institute of Technology and the University of Chicago.

In addition to her academic positions, Jill Walker Rettberg is a member of the Research Council of Norway's portfolio board for Humanities and Social Sciences (2019–2023), and was previously a member of Arts Council Norway's research and development committee. She co-authored the official Norwegian report NOU 2013:2 on hindrances for digital growth and was a member of the Norwegian Privacy Commission. Rettberg is a frequently cited expert in Norwegian media.

== Blogging and social media ==
Rettberg started her research blog jill/txt in 2000 and was thus one of the earliest academic bloggers. In 2002 she co-authored the first scholarly paper on blogs with Torill Mortensen. In 2003 she wrote a definition of weblog for the Routledge Encyclopedia of Narrative Theory, posting a first draft to her blog and asking readers for feedback that she then integrated into the final definition. In 2006 she published a paper describing the transition from blogging as a PhD student to blogging as an established academic as being challenging, and identifying three types of academic blogging. As described by Melissa Gregg, these three types are: 1) public intellectuals with large audiences whose blogs are a defining feature of their reputation or notoriety, 2) the research log, an online version of the traditional notebook or record-book, and 3) pseudonymous blogs about academic life. Building on this, Gregg characterised academic blogs as a "subcultural form of expression favored by young academics as part of constructing a professional identity".

Rettberg's book Blogging was published by Polity in 2008, with a second editing published in 2014. Reviewers wrote that it had an "intelligent theoretical and critical attitude", an accessible style and recognised "that blogging is ultimately about humans, not metrics".

== Selfies and machine vision ==
With the book Seeing Ourselves Through Technology: How We Use Selfies, Blogs and Wearable Devices to See and Shape Ourselves, Rettberg examined three key modes of self-representation in social media: textual, as in blogs, visual, as in selfies, and quantitative, as in self-tracking and the growing quantitative self movement. She argued that seeing these modes in combination is key to understanding social media as a whole. It is listed on the syllabus at over 100 universities according to Open Syllabus.

In 2018 Rettberg launched a research project on Machine Vision funded by the European Research Council. The project developed the Database of Machine Vision in Art, Games and Narratives, which contains structured analyses of situations involving machine vision technologies from 500 creative works. The data is available for download and is analysed in several scholarly papers. The book Machine Vision: How Algorithms are Changing the Way We See the World (Polity Press) comes out of this project.

== Books ==
- Machine Vision: How Algorithms are Changing the Way We See the World. Polity Press. 2023.
- Seeing Ourselves Through Technology: How We Use Selfies, Blogs and Wearable Devices to See and Shape Ourselves. Basingstoke: Palgrave, October 2014.
- Blogging. Cambridge: Polity Press, 2008, 2nd ed. 2014. (1st ed. trans.: Polish, Korean.)
- (co-editor, with Hilde Corneliussen) Digital Culture, Play, and Identity: A World of Warcraft Reader. Cambridge MA: MIT Press, 2008.

== Major grants and awards ==
- ERC Advanced grant (€2.5 million) 2024-2029.
- ERC Consolidator grant (€2 million) 2018–2023.
- John Lovas Award for Best Academic Weblog for Snapchat Research Stories
- The Meltzer Prize for Excellence in Research Dissemination, 2005.
- The Inaugural Ted Nelson Newcomer Award at the ACM Hypertext conference in 1999.
