= Chris Hecker =

American video game programmer and commentator

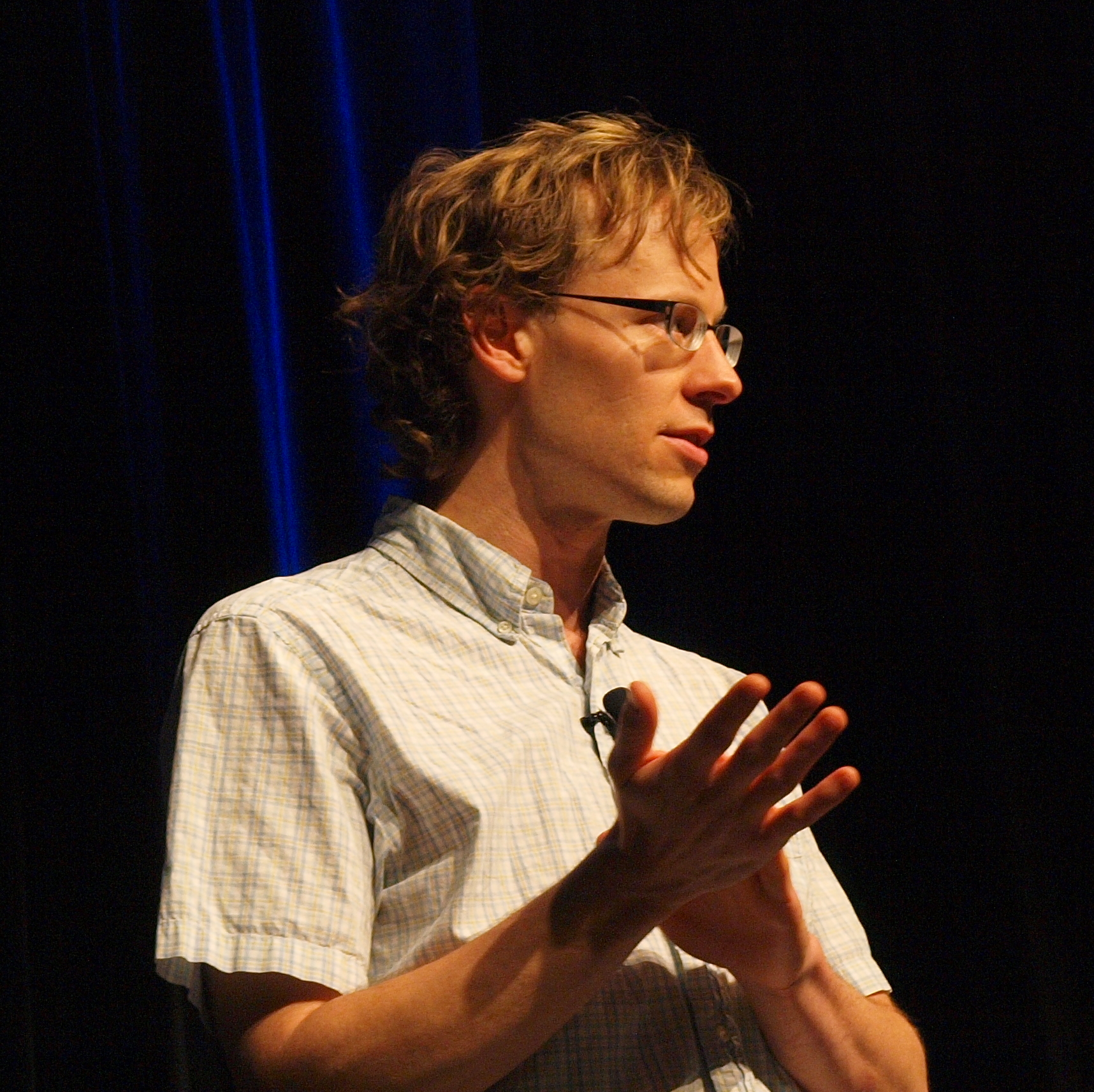
- At the 2010 Game Developers Conference
- Born: Christopher Bryan Hecker; 1970 (age 55–56); St. Louis, Missouri, USA
- Occupation: Former Technology Fellow at Maxis

Christopher Bryan Hecker (born 1970) is an American video game programmer and commentator. He is the founder of the game development company Definition Six and is best known for his engineering work on Will Wright's 2008 game Spore. Hecker is an advocate for independent game development and co-founded the Indie Game Jam. He has written influential articles on programming and has been an editor for Game Developer Magazine and the Journal of Graphics Tools.

== Biography ==
Hecker studied fine arts at Parsons School of Design in New York City, with the goal of becoming an illustrator. Along the way, he noticed an article in Byte Magazine about computer programming which piqued his interest. He switched career tracks and dropped out of school to begin work on graphics and games.

Hecker obtained a job at Microsoft in Seattle, Washington around 1992. He worked there for three years, becoming creator and leader of the WinG API project for the Windows operating system. After completing WinG, he moved to Microsoft's entertainment division where he wrote the rendering engine for the real-time globe display in the Encarta World Atlas. In 1995, Hecker left Microsoft to form his own company in Seattle, Definition Six, a games and computer graphics consulting company that was later moved to Oakland, California. The company focused on the development of physics technology for games and lobbied for the OpenGL standard for graphics display. The company never actually shipped a commercial title, but did produce a tech demo. He also spent several years working independently on a game based on rock climbing as a side project, though it was never completed.

In 2004, Hecker took a job with Maxis where he worked with Will Wright on what became the 2008 game Spore. He led the development of many of the key technologies on Spore, including the core creature tessellation, painting, skinning, and animation technologies. Hecker's research and development effort on Spore is widely regarded as a major step forward in procedural character animation and rendering. Part of the technology he developed while working on the project was later selected for publication in the SIGGRAPH 2008 Transactions on Graphics conference proceedings, and became a featured presentation at that conference. Wright later claimed in an interview that Hecker's work on Spore had advanced the state of the art in procedural animation by several years. Following Spore's release in late 2008, some players believed that comments Hecker had made in Seed Magazine indicated that he had been primarily responsible for the game's lack of hard scientific backing. This interpretation of the interview was discredited by Wright and Spore producer Lucy Bradshaw. Hecker was laid off from Maxis in late 2009, and is currently working on the "indie" game SpyParty, which was released as an early access title in 2018.

On December 4, 2013, Microsoft announced that Hecker's studio, Definition Six, was one of many indie game developers to join the ID@Xbox program.

Hecker's other side projects have included acting as editor of Game Developer Magazine and serving on the editorial board for the Journal of Graphics Tools. As of 2008, he was the longest serving advisor of the Game Developers Conference. Hecker was awarded the Community Contribution award at the 2006 Game Developers Conference.

== Other contributions ==
=== Articles ===
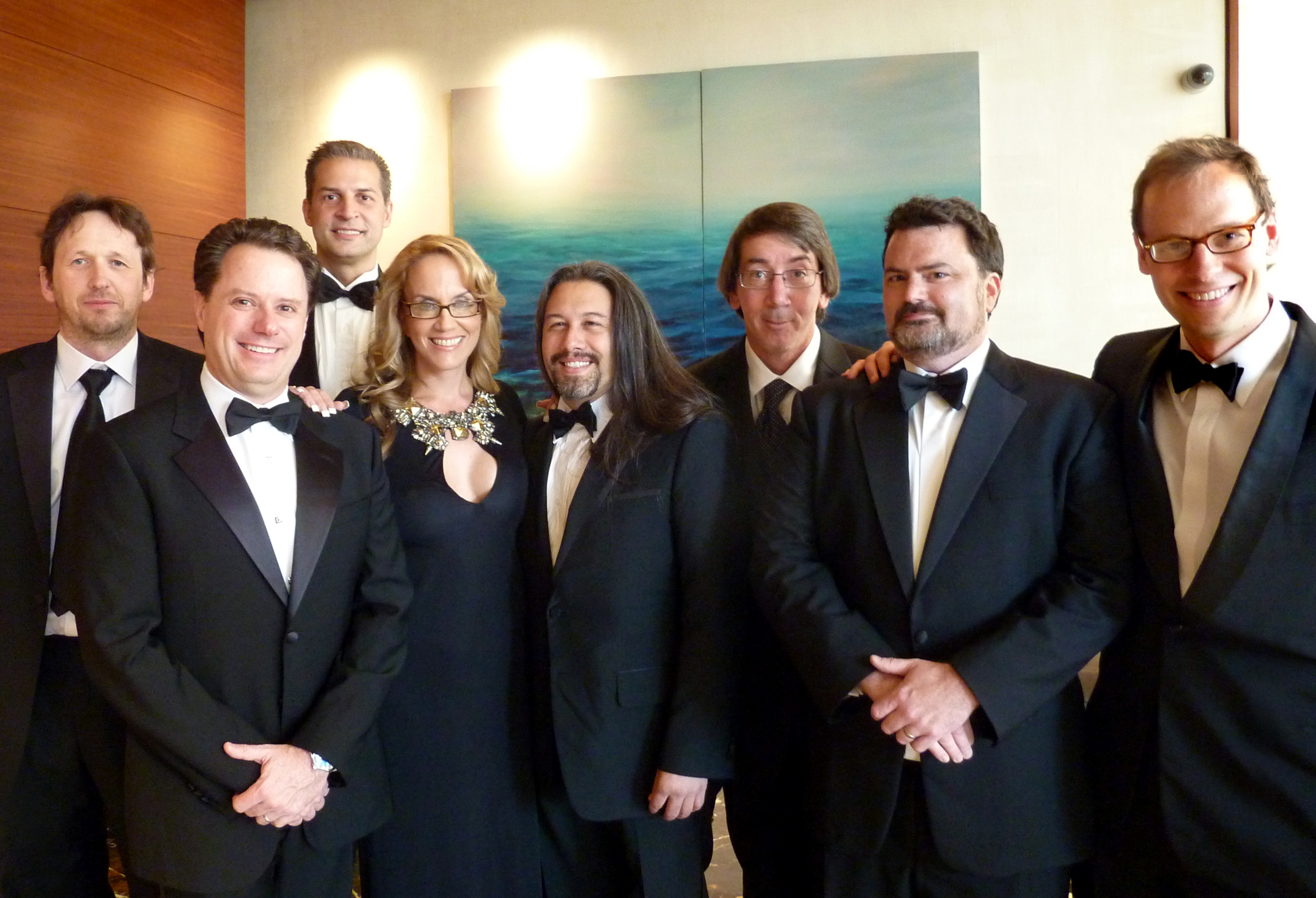
Hecker and other game developers at a BAFTA event in Los Angeles in July 2011. From left: Rod Humble, Louis Castle, David Perry, Brenda Brathwaite, John Romero, Will Wright, Tim Schafer, Chris Hecker.

During his time at Microsoft and Definition Six, Hecker wrote an influential programming column for Game Developer Magazine. Two series of articles from this column still serve today as standard references on their respective subjects. The first series was the first complete synthesis of perspectively-correct texture mapping and formed the mathematical basis for many important game rasterizers, including Michael Abrash's rasterizer for the 3D title Quake. The second was a series on rigid body dynamics simulation for games, complete with an extensive bibliography of rigid body dynamics resources. The articles were part of a general push by Hecker to incorporate more interactive physics into games, which at the time in 1996 rarely featured any physical simulation. In the summer of 1997, Hecker stepped down as author of the regular column to focus on game development full-time.

=== Indie game advocacy ===
Hecker has lobbied heavily for the development of an independent games movement in many interviews and speaking engagements. Lamenting the lack of innovation in gameplay, he has pushed for alternative markets and models for small-scale video game production. In 2002, with the help of a few friends, Hecker co-founded the successful Indie Game Jam. In addition to directly leading to the creation of at least one commercial title, the Indie Game Jam inspired others to create local game jams worldwide, including the Boston Game Jam and Toronto Game Jam.
