= IT University of Copenhagen =

Technical university in Copenhagen Denmark

- Danish: IT-Universitetet i København
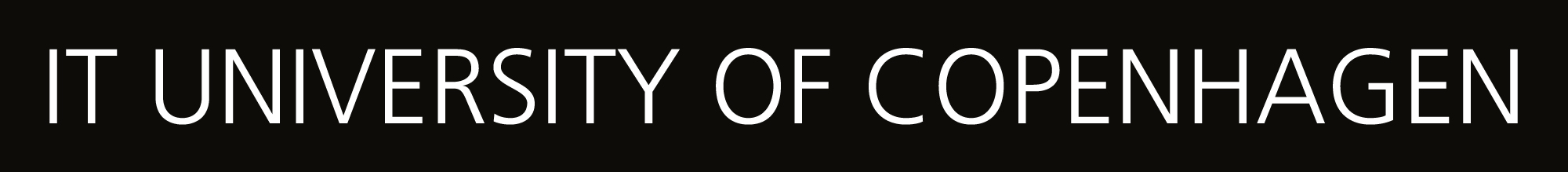
- Type: Public
- Established: 1999; 27 years ago
- Chairman: Carsten Gomard
- Rector: Per Bruun Brockhoff (from Sep 2022)
- Faculty: 224 (2025)
- Total staff: 463 (2025)
- Students: 3,014 (2025)
- Undergraduates: 1,120 (2025)
- Postgraduates: 1,371 (2025)
- Doctoral students: 69 (2025)
- Location: Copenhagen, Denmark
- Campus: Urban
- Website: en.itu.dk

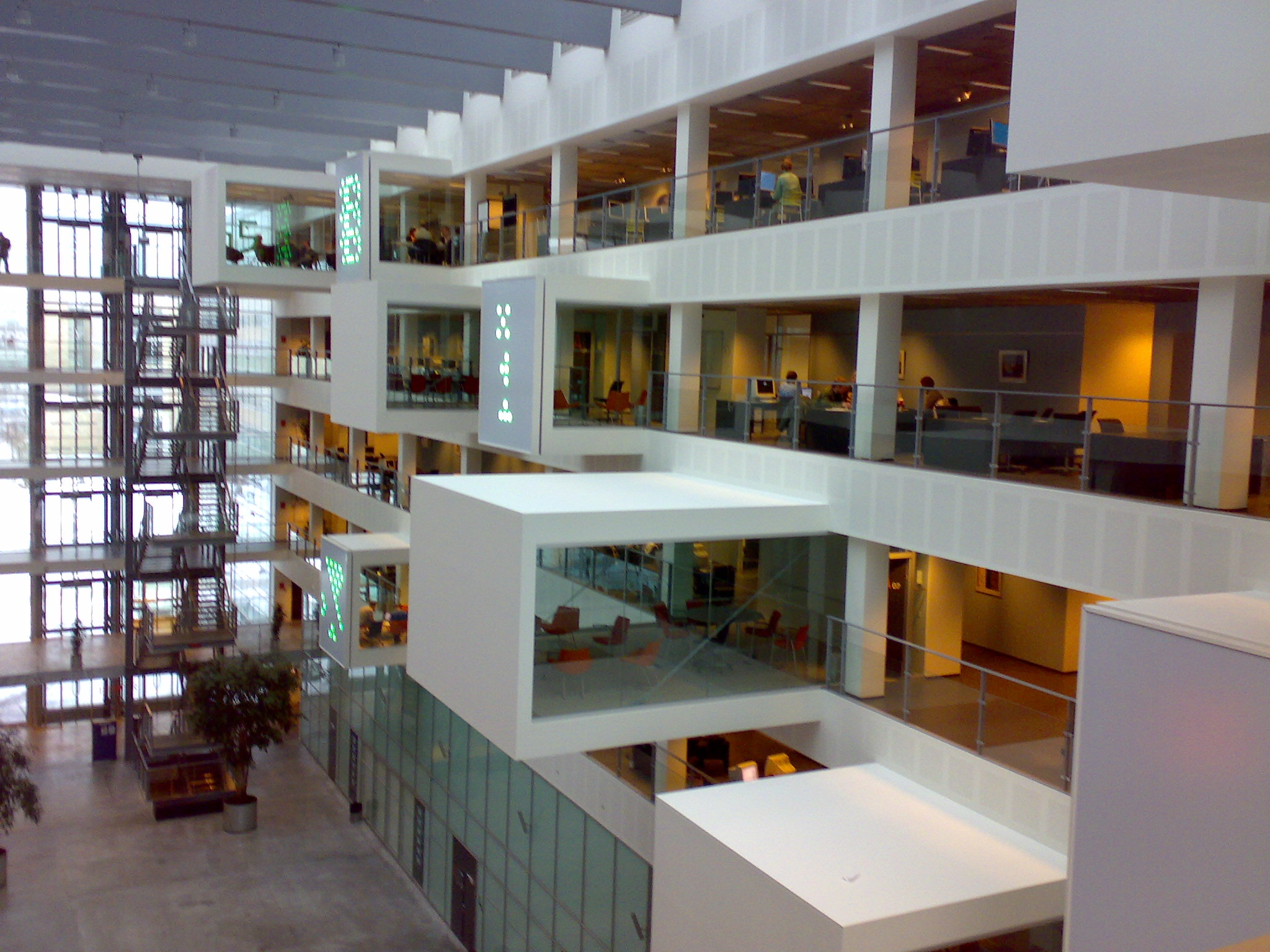
The interior design work at the IT University of Copenhagen

The IT University of Copenhagen (ITU; Danish: IT-Universitetet i København) is a public university and research institution in Copenhagen, Denmark. It is specialized in the multidisciplinary study of information technology within computer science, business IT and digital design.

There are approximately 200 faculty members, 70 PhD students, and around 3000 students. Among all admitted Bachelor and Master students at the IT University of Copenhagen in 2025, 41 percent were female.

== History ==
The IT University of Copenhagen was established in 1999, which makes it Denmark's youngest university. At that time, it was—in Danish—called "IT-højskolen". When a new Danish university law was passed in 2003, the college officially became a university and changed its name accordingly.

In 2004, the university moved to its own new building in Ørestad, a newly developed area in Copenhagen on the island of Amager. The new building was designed by Danish architect Henning Larsen. The university is located right between the University of Copenhagen's new South Campus and the headquarters of the Danish Broadcasting Corporation (DR), and close to the DR Byen metro station. In 2020, the university extended its campus, taking over facilities in the neighboring DR complex.

== Administration and organization ==
The IT University is governed by a board consisting of 9 members: 5 members recruited from outside of the university form the majority of the board, 1 member is appointed by the scientific staff, 1 member is appointed by the administrative staff, and 2 members are appointed by the university students. The Rector is appointed by the university board.

After a restructuring in early 2025, the university has nine sections, which replace the prior three departments.

=== Degree programs ===
The university originally only accepted students with a Bachelor's degree to its offered Master programs, but started its first Bachelor of Science program in Software Development in August 2007. As of 2025, the IT University offers four Bachelor programs (two of which are internationally oriented and taught in English), six Master study programs (four of which are internationally oriented and are taught in English), two industrial Master study programs (from 2027), professional Master's study programs, and approximately 100 courses each semester.

== Research ==
The IT University takes a multidisciplinary approach to the study of information technology, drawing from a variety of academic perspectives. These include the natural sciences (traditional computer science), software engineering, data science, information economics, information systems, computational social science, science and technology studies (STS), CSCW, computer games studies, and the cultural and aesthetic aspects of IT.

The stated objective of the university's research is to strengthen Denmark's ability to create value with IT. The research aims to provide new insight that could be the foundation for new types of interaction, new breakthroughs in digital culture, better resource optimization, technological innovation and much more. An important part of the research conducted at the university is the PhD program that enrolls PhD students from all over the world.

The university's research is organized into nine research sections:

- Data Science
- Data, Systems, and Robotics
- Digital Business Innovation
- Digitalization, Democracy, and Governance
- Human-Computer Interaction and Design
- Play, Culture, and AI
- Software Engineering
- Technologies in Practice
- Theoretical Computer Science

The university's research practice is organized through a handful of research centres:

- Center for Climate IT
- Center for Computing Education Research
- Center for Digital Play (former Center for Computer Games Research)
- Center for Information Security and Trust
- Danish Institute for IT Program Management
- Research Centre for Government IT
- The Maritime Hub

== Notable alumni ==
- Gonzalo Frasca, game designer
- Lisbeth Klastrup, digital culture researcher
- Jesper Juul, game researcher
- Noor Shaker, entrepreneur

== Notable Companies, Software, Research from ITU ==
- Tiimo
- Crinkle Cut Games
- What the Clash
- ONE BTN BOSSES
- Dark Room Sex Game
- Machineers
- NVIDIA garak
- The Eye Tribe
- Zendesk

== See also ==
- Open access in Denmark
