= Global Game Jam =

Non-profit organization

- Abbreviation: GGJ
- Formation: 2008, with first Game Jam held January 30–February 1, 2009
- Type: non-profit charity 501(c)(3)
- Headquarters: San Luis Obispo, California
- Region served: International
- President: Sabrina Culyba
- Key people: Executive Director: Maria Burns Ortiz Director of Events and Programs: Rich Hebblewhite Director of Communications: Tarja Porkka-Kontturi Director of Technology: Zain Ul Hassan
- Parent organization: Global Game Jam, Inc.
- Staff: 3
- Volunteers: 1000+
- Website: globalgamejam.org

The Global Game Jam (GGJ) is an annual distributed game jam. Inspired by the Nordic Game Jam, and created by Susan Gold, Ian Schreiber, Gorm Lai and Foaad Khosmood, originally developed under the International Game Developers Association Education SIG to bring together the elements of creativity, collaboration and experimentation. At each site, participants gather to develop ideas, form small groups, create new, creative, innovative games, and present them to their peers and the global community, all in a limited time span. As of 2013, GGJ is managed by Global Game Jam Incorporated. Current and past board directors include the founders Elonka Dunin, Lindsay Grace and Zuraida Buter. 2022 staff members are Executive Director Tim Cullings, Director of Operations Charly Harbord, and Senior Director of Communications Tarja Porkka-Kontturi.

In January 2019, GGJ generated teams in 860 sites in 113 countries, who over the course of one weekend created 9,010 games. The Global Game Jam carries a registered trademark.

In January 2022, GGJ lasted 10 days and nights and was the longest jam in the organization's 14-year history. 33,000 jammers registered at 680 sites in 100 countries.

== Participants ==
Participants in the Global Game Jam are of all skill levels and in various fields. Everyone from professional game developers to educators to artists and designers is welcome to participate. Once the jam begins, participants come up with game ideas, before pitching those ideas to each other and forming teams to work together on a project.

== Event organization ==
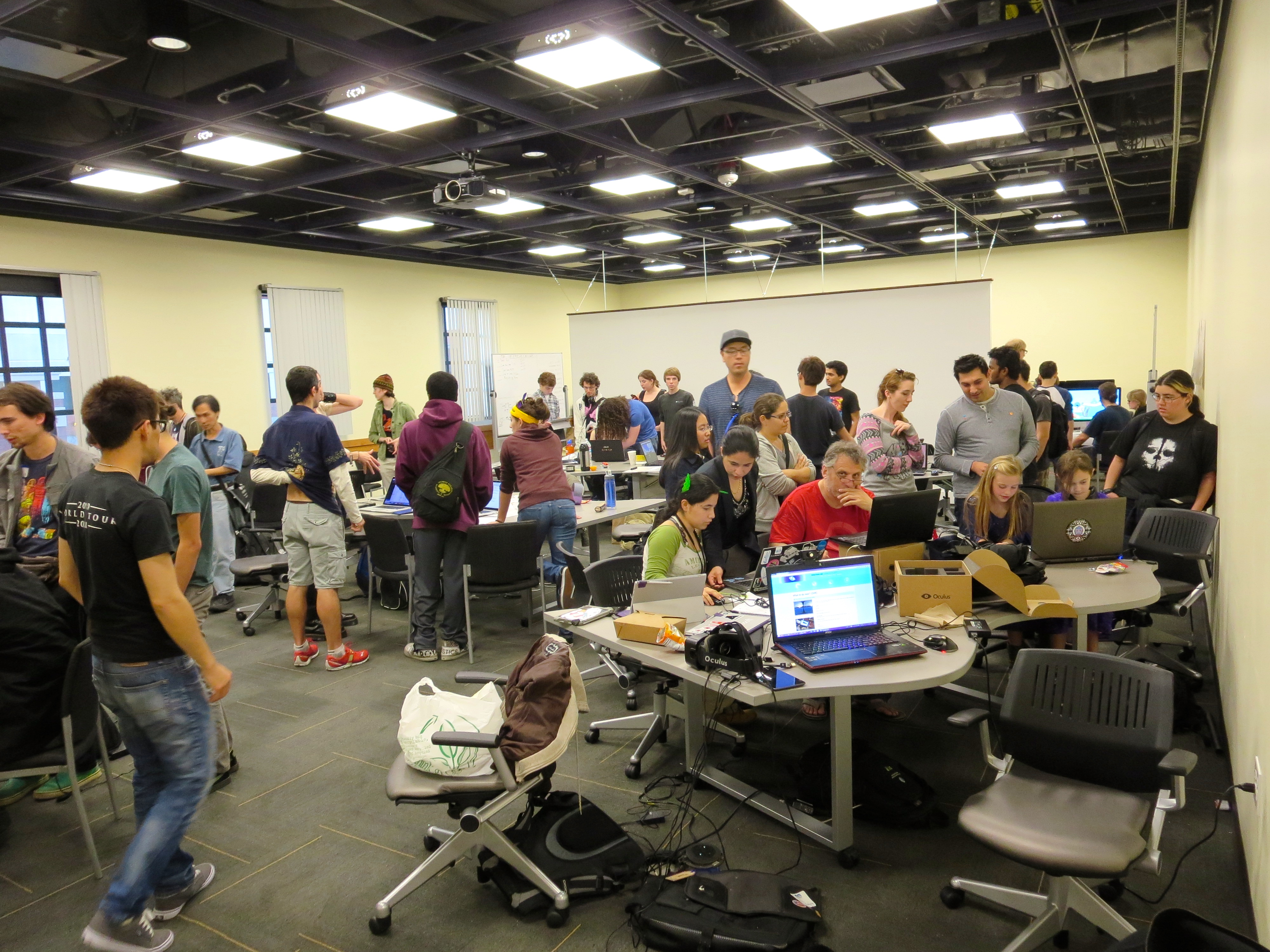
An image from the Global Game Jam in Los Angeles 2015

Groups wishing to host a jam site must fulfill certain requirements. Their location must have Internet access for everyone involved, access to development resources such as an IDE, possibly preinstalled at the location, an event coordinator, beverages and nearby food access, if possible, round-the-clock availability of the location, and security for belongings.

At each site, the Global Game Jam runs continuously for 48 hours in each time zone, beginning at 5:00 PM on the start date, and ending at 5:00 PM two days later. The recommended schedule includes a short planning and team creation period, followed by development time until 3:00 PM on the final day. The last few hours are set aside for teams to present their creations to each other. However, sites are not required to follow this schedule.

At the beginning of the event participants are given a theme, such as "Extinction" in the 2011 Jam. Participants are asked to create a game that in some way relates to this theme. Additionally, participants are given a list of "achievements", also referred to as diversifiers. These are designed to drive creative development by adding a unique or limiting factor to their game's design.

== Past events ==
The first Global Game Jam was held from January 30 – February 1, 2009, at 53 locations across the globe. During the jam, 1650 participants created 370 games.

The second Jam expanded further in 2010, increasing to 138 sites and resulting in 900 games made by 4300 creators.

The 2011 Game Jam, which ran January 28–30, gathered 6500 participants at 169 sites who created over 1500 games total.

The 2012 Game Jam ran January 27–29 with over 10,684 participants in 242 locations (47 countries). 2209 games were created. According to a March 2 press release, the Global Game Jam is recognized as the largest in the world by the Guinness Book of World Records.

The 2013 Game Jam was held January 25–27 with 16,705 participants in 319 locations (63 countries). 3248 games were created.

The 2014 GGJ was held January 24–26 with 23,198 participants in 488 locations (72 countries). 4290 games were created.

The 2015 GGJ took place from 23 to 25 January with 28,837 participants in 518 registered jam sites in 518 locations (78 countries). 5438 games were created.

The 2016 GGJ was held January 29–31 with over 36,164 participants in 93 countries.

The 2017 GGJ was held January 20–22 with over 36,401 participants in 95 countries.

The 2018 GGJ was held January 26–28 with 42,811 participants in 108 countries. 8,606 games were made at 803 locations.

The 2019 GGJ was held January 25–27 with 47,009 participants in 113 countries. 9,010 games were made at 860 locations.

The 2020 GGJ was held January 31 – February 1 with 48,753 participants in 118 countries. 9601 games were made at 934 locations.

The 2021 GGJ was held January 27 – January 31 with 28,825 registered participants at 585 sites in 104 countries. 6,383 games were made. (Online only due to COVID-19 pandemic)

The 2022 GGJ was held January 20 – January 30 with 33,000 registered participants at 680 sites in 100 countries. 5,860 games were made.

The 2023 GGJ was held January 30 – February 5 with 33,664 registered participants at 800 sites in 108 countries. 7,637 games were made.

The 2024 GGJ was held January 22 – January 28 with 34,649 registered participants at 796 sites in 102 countries, for the first time on all 7 continents. 9,964 games were made.

The 2025 GGJ was held January 20 - January 26 with 35,371 registered participants at 795 sites in 97 countries. 12,098 games were made.

== Event themes ==
GGJ theme of year 2012, an Ouroboros figure

- 2009 – "As long as we have each other, we will never run out of problems"
- 2010 – "Deception" (plus extra time-zone-specific themes, including "The rain in Spain falls mainly on the plain")
- 2011 – "Extinction"
- 2012 – An image of Ouroboros
- 2013 – Sound of a Heartbeat
- 2014 – "We don't see things as they are, we see them as we are."
- 2015 – "What do we do now?"
- 2016 – "Ritual"
- 2017 – "Waves"
- 2018 – "Transmission"
- 2019 – "What home means to you"
- 2020 – "Repair"
- 2021 – "Lost and Found"
- 2022 – "Duality"
- 2023 – "Roots"
- 2024 – "Make Me Laugh"
- 2025 – "Bubble"
- 2026 – "Mask"

== Intellectual property ==
All games produced are created under the Creative Commons Non Commercial Share Alike 3.0 free license, therefore they remain the intellectual property of their creators, while the Global Game Jam retains the ability to use any game as promotional material. As a part of this and as part of the license, every game is archived, along with source code for many digital games, on Global Game Jam's website.
