= List of electronic literature works =

Electronic literature is a literary genre defined as “born digital” works that use computational media to create artistic literary effects with an expanded repertoire that goes well beyond words.

See the overall links to electronic literature authors, critics, resources, and works.

== Timeline ==
=== 1950s ===
See Category:Electronic literature works by decade: Category:1950s electronic literature works - - - - - --

- Strachey love letter algorithm is a combinatory algorithm for the Manchester Mark 1 computer which could create love letters.

=== 1960s ===
See Category:1960s electronic literature works

- ELIZA, natural language processing computer program
- The Sumerian Game, text-based strategy video game of land and resource management

=== 1970s ===
Category:1970s electronic literature works

- Blikk (artwork), a Norwegian art installation by Irma Salo Jæger, Jan Erik Vold and Sigurd Berge(1970, recreated in 2022)

=== 1980s ===
Category:1980s electronic literature works

- Portal, text-based video adventure by Rob Swigart (1986)
- Uncle Roger, a narrabase story and one of the earliest hypertexts, by Judy Malloy (1986-1988)
- afternoon, a story, written in 1987 and published by Eastgate Systems in 1990, one of the first literary hypertext. By Michael Joyce (1987, 1990)

=== 1990s ===
Category:1990s electronic literature works

- King of Space (1991) by Sarah Smith. A dark science fiction myth.
- Agrippa (A Book of the Dead), self-destructing artwork-based poem by William Gibson (1992)
- Victory Garden by Stuart Moulthrop (1992). A literary hypertext set at the outset of the first Gulf War.
- Forward Anywhere, hypertext narrative by Judy Malloy and Cathy Marshall. An epistolary hypertext novel.
- Uncle Buddy's Phantom Funhouse (1993) by John McDaid. A dense artifactual hypertext, a chocolate box filled with death.
- I Have Said Nothing (1993) by Jane Yellowleas Douglas. An early work of Storyspace hypertext published by Eastgate Systems, Inc. It traces two fatal car crashes through fragmented, interlinked lexia exploring causality, memory, and grief.
- Marble Springs (1993) by Deena Larsen. A hypertext of interconnected vignettes about the interconnected denizens of a Colorado town.
- Its Name Was Penelope (1993, 2016) by Judy Malloy. An intense hypertextual ode to the long years of AIDS.
- Socrates in the Labyrinth (1994) by David Kolb. A nonlinear philosophical work of Storyspace hypertext.
- Patchwork Girl by Shelley Jackson (1995). A feminist Frankenstein, critically acclaimed.
- Notes Toward Absolute Zero (1995) Tim McLaughlin's hypertext narrative created using Eastgate Systems, Inc. Storyspace software.
- My Boyfriend Came Back from the War, hypertext artwork by Olia Lialina (1996)
- Six Sex Scenes, novella by Adrienne Eisen (1996)
- Twelve Blue, hypertext fiction by Michael Joyce (1996)
- 253 or Tube Theatre by Geoff Ryman (1997). A subway train and its passengers hurtle towards the end of the line.
- Samplers: Nine Vicious Little Hypertexts (1997) by Deena Larsen. A quilt of short stories.
- Egypt: The book of Going Forth by Day Marjorie Luesebrink M.D. Coverley
- The Impermanence Agent (1998 -2002) See History of the Web Browser
- Light-Water: a Mosaic of Meditations, hypermedia poetry by Christy Sheffield Sanford (1999)
- The Unknown by William Gillespie, Scott Rettberg, and Dirk Stratton (1999)

=== 2000s ===
Category:2000s electronic literature works

- Califia (2000) by M.D. Coverley. Califia is a hypermedia novel written by M.D. Coverley in ToolBook II, and released in 2000 by Eastgate Systems on CD-ROM. It is considered an early influential text in the field of electronic literature.
- Storyland by Nanette Wylde (2000)
- Lexia to Perplexia by Talan Memmott (2000). A hypermedia work exploring the entanglement of language, identity, and the body within networked digital environment.
- Of day, of night by Megan Hayward (2000, 2002)
- Tramway by Alexandra Saemmer (2000/2009). A combinatorial and interactive poem on the author's experiences with her father's death.
- Nio by Jim Andrews (2001)
- These Waves of Girls by Caitlin Fisher (2001)
- Talan Memmott's (2001, Flash) The Hugo Ball interprets Hugo Ball's "Gadji beri bimba."
- haikU by Nanette Wylde (2001)
- Firefly (2002) by Deena Larsen . Flash poem with 5 stanzas and six lines
- Screen (VR poem) (2003)
- Meaning Maker, conceptual, social practice art project by Kent Manske and Nanette Wylde (2006)
- Game, game, game and again game by Jason Nelson (2008),
- Snack Time! is an interactive fiction work by Renee Choba (2008)

=== 2010s ===
Category:2010s electronic literature works

- The Mongoliad, fictional narrative by Neal Stephenson and Greg Bear (2010)
- Déprise / Loss of Grasp, interactive narrative by Serge Bouchardon (2010)
- Böhmische Dörfer, digital poem by Alexandra Saemmer (2011)
- Kentucky Route Zero (2011)
- Between Page and Screen (2012) by Amaranth Borsuk
- Clockwork Watch, collaborative storytelling project, Yomi Ayeni (2012)
- Modern Moral Fairy Tales (presented in 2012) by Deena Larsen
- Depression Quest, interactive fiction game by Zoë Quinn (2013) telling the story of a person suffering from depression and their attempts to deal with their condition.
- Notes on the Voyage of Owl and Girl (2014) by J.R. Carpenter
- Nothing you have done deserves such praise (2013), I made this. you play this. we are enemies (2009), and Scrape Scraperteeth (2011) are examples of the intersection of games and poetry by Jason Nelson.
- Queers in Love at the End of the World, hypertext game by Anna Anthropy (2013)
- Shan Shui (2014) by Chen Qian Xun
- Notes on the Voyage of Owl and Girl by J.R. Carpenter (2014), a nautical adventure about a girl and owl; a generative work with some interaction.
- Snow by Shelley Jackson (2014-)
- 1000 Days of Syria (2014), hypertext fiction game by Mitch Swenson
- With Those We Love Alive (2014) by Porpentine
- The Old Axolotl, Polish digital novel by Jacek Dukaj (2015)
- The Imaginary 20th Century (2016)
- 17776 by Jon Bois (2016)
- Poesie Elettroniche (2016) The Imaginary 20th Century, historical comic novel by) Norman M. Klein (2016)
- Playing with Rose: Exploring a New Conceptual Language (presented in 2016) by Deena Larsen
- C ya laterrrr, hypertext fiction by Dan Hett (2017)
- Dictionary of the Revolution (2017) by Amira Hanafi, a hypertext narrative about the 2011 Egyptian revolution
- Andromeda and Eliza (2017) by Deena Larsen
- This is a Picture of Wind (2018) by J.R. Carpenter
- Black Mirror: Bandersnatch is a 2018 interactive film i
- ReRites, poetry work by David Jhave Johnston (2019)
- No World 4 Tomorrow (2019) by Lyle Skains

=== 2020s ===
Category:2020s electronic literature works [edit source]

- An Island of Sound (2022) by J.R. Carpenter
- Figurski at Findhorn on Acid (2001, 2021) by Richard Holeton is a hypertext novel with three characters centered around a mechanical pig.
- We Descend (2003, 2017, 2023) by Bill Bly
- V-R-erses An XR Story Series (2019-2024) by Mez Breeze
- Dim Sum (2024) is a collection of poems celebrating Chinese culture and food, created with Lai-Tze Fan, Kalee Wong, Angela Chang, and Biyi We
- See works at ELO 2026 Online Exhibition
- See works at ELO 2020 + ACM HT20 Media Arts Exhibitions

== See also ==
- The NEXT Museum, Library, and Preservation Space
- Eastgate Systems – publisher of hypertext fiction
- Consortium on Electronic Literature – find works of electronic literature across databases
- See Category:Electronic literature award winners
