= Mark Bernstein (publisher) =

Hypertext pioneer and software developer

Mark Bernstein is one of the first publishers of hypertext fiction in the United States. He is the founder and chief scientist of Eastgate Systems, a software and literary publishing company that has maintained and developed the hypertext authoring software Storyspace since 1990, and that launched the hypertextual note-taking software Tinderbox in 2002. Bernstein has also made significant contributions to the critical discourse on hypertext with dozens of peer-reviewed publications.

== Life and education ==
Bernstein graduated from Swathmore college and earned a PhD in chemistry from Harvard. Bernstein relates that he became interested in the potential for computer work while he was working in laser chemistry, which required computing powers.

== Hypertext publisher ==
Bernstein founded Eastgate Systems in 1982 as a software publishing company. In 1990, Eastgate became the first commercial publisher of hypertext fictions when the company published Michael Joyce's afternoon, a story. The same year Bernstein licensed the hypertext authoring software Storyspace, which became the leading platform for hypertext fictions in the early 1990s. Bernstein has continued to maintain Storyspace since 1990. Bernstein also established the literary journal Eastgate Quarterly Review of Hypertext (EQRH), which was "fundamental in the establishment of creative practices in the context of electronic literature."

By 1993 a The New York Times article by novelist Robert Coover described Bernstein as Eastgate Systems' "chief scientist, reader, theorist, pitchman and indefatigable enthusiast". In the following decades, scholars have described Bernstein as a "hypertext pioneer", pioneer of "serious hypertext" and an "electronic publishing pioneer". Many of the hypertext fictions Bernstein published are now in library collections. Some of the most notable include the aforementioned afternoon, a story, Shelley Jackson's Patchwork Girl, Stuart Moulthrop's Victory Garden, and M.D. Coverley's Califia.

== Scholarly contributions ==
Bernstein has published dozens of scholarly articles, including 66 publications in the ACM Digital Library between 1988 and 2025. He has been particularly active in the ACM SIGWEB community, serving on the Program Committee of several ACM Hypertext Conferences and as program co-chair in 1996 and 1997. He has also been a chair on the Web Sci conference.

In addition to traditional peer-reviewed publications, Bernstein has also authored non-fiction in hypertext format. With Eric Sweeney, Mark Bernstein wrote an early non-fiction hypertext, The Election of 1912: A Hypertext Study of the Progressive Era (1988), which David Farkas termed a "pioneering hypertext history." The Electronic Literature Lab created a live traversal of this work in 2020. As M. Pisarski described the work as a game where the reader plays Theodore Roosevelt and must defeat other candidates. "The Election of 1912 combines non-linear narrative with a robust simulation mode set within a historical background." J. Yellowlees Douglas explains that Mark Bernstein's and Erin Sweeney's Work, The Election of 1912 has 169 nodes with information on people, issues, and contexts for this simulation of the election. However, rereading nodes seems to present much more information because “the information in each node appears in dramatically different contexts, depending on the users that the actor in the simulation finds for it.”

== Selected works ==
Bernstein has 66 publications in the ACM Digital Library. Some of his most cited publications are:

- 1988 - "The bookmark and the compass: orientation tools for hypertext users"
- 1998 - "Patterns of Hypertext"
- 2001 - "Card shark and thespis: exotic tools for hypertext narrative"
- 2011 - (anthology, co-edited with Diane Greco): Reading Hypertext (2011) (reviewed by Marvin Hobson)

== Selected keynotes and invited talks ==
- Where are the Hypertexts? 1999 ACM Hypertext Conference
- Blog Talk 2.0 in 2004
- Invited talk at WikiSym '06: the 2006 international symposium on Wikis
- ICIDS2020 KEYNOTE BY MARK BERNSTEIN

== Awards ==
- 2022 - ACM SigWeb Douglas Engelbart Best Paper Award (with Stee McMorris).
