= We Descend =

We Descend is a work of electronic literature by American author Bill Bly. This work encompasses four versions from 1997 through 2023 and was originally written in Storyspace and published by Eastgate Systems (1997).

== Plot and structure ==
We Descend is a collection of writings passed along over many generations. The work has a default path which introduces us to these various assemblages and putative writers. "The story spans four timelines, beginning with a future post-apocalyptic storyline of Egderus who digs down through eons of data to reconstruct cultural history, encountering, along the way, writings by an ancient who calls himself the Last One. The metaphor of the “archaeological dig” serves “to visualize time” Bly uses hypertext linking to collate and annotate this archive and to create hidden writings that exist "behind gated links that may unlock truths about the archive."

== Publication history and influences ==
The work was originally published on stand-alone floppy disks (one for Mac and one for PC) from Eastgate Systems in 1997, in the form later called Volume 1. Excerpts from We Descend were published in Word Circuits in 1996. The online journal, New River (Virginia Tech) brought out Volume 2 in its Fall, 2017 edition, and subsequently, a preliminary view of Volume 3 appeared in the same journal in Fall 2019. The NEXT Museum, Library, and Preservation Space presented Volume 3 in 2023. Volume 2 was created using Tinderbox. The Bill Bly collection at the Maryland Institute for Technology in the Humanities houses notes and various early versions of We Descend. This work was featured in Pathfinders traversals in 2015.

Brian Davis calls this work "an early exemplar of 'archival fiction,'” and notes that this ongoing work is also "one of the longest running hypertext sagas in electronic literary history." Bernstein traces We Descend's roots to Michael Joyce's afternoon. This work was also one of the subject works for the Pathfinders Project with Dene Grigar and Stuart Moulthrop. As Grigar explains, "Ultimately, what We Descend suggests is that we––all humans––are capable of descending and ascending, depending on how heroically we fight for the truth, how hard we work to place truth at the center of our lives." The Electronic Literature Directory notes that "We Descend is a work unmatched in its levels of complexity and thoughtfulness. As a result, it has captured the attention of scholars (such as Dene Grigar, Mark Bernstein, and Susana Tosca) who have written essays on the subject, and has been showcased at the Electronic Literature Organization’s media art show State of the Arts in 2002."

Astrid Ensslin analyzed We Descend as a literary hypertext in Canonizing Hypertext: Explorations and Constructions.

== Awards ==
We Descend, Volume Two, New Selected Writings from Archives Pertaining to Egderus Scriptuor won the 2020 Mary Shelley Award for Outstanding Fictional Work from the Media Ecology Association.
