= Jay David Bolter =

American academic

Jay David Bolter (born August 17, 1951) is the Wesley Chair of New Media and a professor in the School of Literature, Media, and Communication at the Georgia Institute of Technology. His areas of study include the evolution of media, the use of technology in education, and the role of computers in the writing process. More recently, he has conducted research in the area of augmented reality and mixed media. Bolter collaborates with researchers in the Augmented Environments Lab, co-directed with Blair MacIntyre, to create apps for entertainment, cultural heritage and education for smart phones and tablets. This supports his theory regarding remediation where he discusses "all media functions as remediators and that remediation offers us a means of interpreting the work of earlier media as well" (Bolter & Grusin, 2000, p. 55).

== Biography ==
Bolter received his B.A. degree in Greek from Trinity College, in the University of Toronto, in 1973. In 1977 and 1978 he received his Ph.D. in Classics and an M.S. in Computer Science, both from the University of North Carolina.

Bolter received prominent fellowships at Yale University, Cornell University, University of Göttingen, and with the American Council of Learned Societies.

From 1979 until 1991, Bolter held various faculty positions at the University of North Carolina. In 1991 he moved to the Georgia Institute of Technology, where he remains today.

== Storyspace ==
Along with John B. Smith and Michael Joyce, Bolter co-created Storyspace, a software program for creating, editing, and displaying hypertext fiction. It was developed to support hypertext fiction in particular, although it can also be used for organizing and writing fiction and non-fiction intended for print. Although always credited as a coauthor of Storyspace with Joyce and Bolter, Smith wanted to clarify in an interview that he wasn’t involved in the development of either TALETELLER (which was a precursor to Storyspace) or Storyspace — but that he made more of an intellectual contribution insofar as "there was a sort of cloud of ideas that we were all drawing on in the discussions we’d have in this research entity at UNC, Textlab"

Some of the notable hypertext fictions created in Storyspace include: Michael Joyce's afternoon, a story, Stuart Moulthrop's Victory Garden and Shelley Jackson's Patchwork Girl.

Bolter has used Storyspace to revise several of his own books. More importantly, Storyspace provides facilities for writing and editing, which includes a map of the structure of the links, making it accessible for new users. Storyspace is currently being developed by Mark Bernstein of Eastgate Systems.

== Trivia ==
Brian Eno has referred to Bolter as "the new Gutenberg."

Bolter states in Writing Space: Computers, Hypertext, and the Remediation of Print that "Hypertext in all its electronic forms — the World Wide Web as well as the many stand-alone systems — is the remediation of print".

Jay David Bolter and his writing partner, Richard Grusin, make the claim in their text Remediation: Understanding New Media, " At this point, all mediation is remediation."

== Select works ==
- Bolter, Jay David. Digital Plenitude: The Decline of Elite Culture and the Rise of New Media. Cambridge: MIT Press, 2019.
- Bolter, Jay David and Gromala, Diane. Windows and Mirrors: Interaction Design, Digital Art and the Myth of Transparency. Cambridge:MIT Press, 2003.
- Bolter, Jay David. Writing Space: Computers, Hypertext, and the Remediation of Print, Second Edition. Mahwah: Lawrence Erlbaum Associates, 2001.
- MacIntyre, Blair, Bolter, Jay David, Moreno, Emmanuel, and Hannigan, Brendan. "Augmented Reality as a New Media Experience," In International Symposium on Augmented Reality (ISAR 2001), New York, NY, October 29–30, 2001.
- Bolter, Jay David and Richard Grusin. Remediation: Understanding New Media. Cambridge: MIT Press, 2000.
- Bolter, Jay David. "Virtual Reality and the Redefinition of Self" in Communication and Cyberspace: Social Interaction in an Electronic Environment, edited by Stephanie Gibson et al. (Hampton Press, 1996).
- Bolter, Jay David. Writing Space: The Computer, Hypertext, and the History of Writing. Mahwah: Lawrence Erlbaum Associates, 1990.
- Bolter, Jay David. Turing's Man: Western Culture in the Computer Age. Chapel Hill: The University of North Carolina Press, 1984.
- Bolter, Jay David. "Examining and Changing the World of Media," in: Humanistic Perspectives in a Technological World, ed. Richard Utz, Valerie B. Johnson, and Travis Denton (Atlanta: School of Literature, Media, and Communication, Georgia Institute of Technology, 2014), pp. 37–9.

== See also ==
- Electronic literature
- George Landow
