= Twelve Blue =

1996 work of hypertext fiction

Twelve Blue is a work of electronic literature by American author Michael Joyce. He is widely known as one of the first writers of hypertext fiction. His first piece afternoon, a story was written in 1987. Joyce created Twelve Blue in 1996 using Storyspace software. This is his first piece of hypertext fiction specifically to be played on the web and published by Eastgate Systems. In 2006, Twelve Blue was selected for inclusion in the first volume of the Electronic Literature Collection, a publication of the Electronic Literature Organization.

== Plot summary ==
This hypertext fiction piece tells the interwoven stories of 12 individuals. On the surface, the stories seem only vaguely connected but become more related as the reader views more links. The fragmented narrative blends the lines between reality and dreams, truth and lies, and time and space.

=== Joyce's description ===
"A drowning, a murder, a friendship, three or four love affairs, a boy and a girl, two girls and their mothers, two mothers and their lovers, a daughter and her father, a father and his lover, seven women, three men, twelve months, twelve threads, eight hours, eight waves, one river, a quilt, a song, twelve interwoven stories, a thousand memories, Twelve Blue explores the way our lives — like the web itself or a year, a day, a memory, or a river — form patterns of interlocking, multiple, and recurrent surfaces."

=== Characters ===
- Javier: A doctor. Once married to Aurelie. Father to Beth. Now in a relationship with Lisle. Goes into the Blue Mountains with Beth to retrieve the last existing image of his grandmother, Mary Reilly.
- Lee (Lisle): Another doctor. In a relationship with Javier. Has a daughter named Samantha.
- Aurelie (Lee): Divorced from Javier. Mother to Beth. Now in a relationship with a woman named Lisa.
- Eleanor: The "madwoman". A tenant of Ed Stanko, whom she sleeps with to pay for her rent. She vows to kill him. She once lost a baby by Javier which has deeply impacted her.
- Ed Stanko: Main antagonist. Owner of a hotel he inherited from his dead wife Flossie Reilly. Is murdered by Eleanor in a bathtub ritual killing. In possession of the picture of Mary Reilly and messes with Javier's ability to get a hold of a copy.
- Tevet (Beth): Daughter of Javier and Aurelie. Her deaf boyfriend drowned in the creek.

== Structure ==
This piece is created using a basic HTML interface.

Not only does the plot show how life is interwoven but the format of the piece does as well. There are multiple starting points as the reader simply clicks on the thread image and it takes them to a brand new URL page. This can continue for as long as the reader presses new links, and may find themselves either viewing pages they have already seen before or brand new ones with more information to link parts of the story together.

== Reception ==
A 2017 review of Twelve Blue by Najafipour and Pourgiv argues that because the contemporary hypertext genre is so wildly expansive and different from traditional literature, it requires different procedures for analysis and criticism. They discuss specifically how this genre also requires different skills of the reader that may potentially make them uncomfortable due to their habits of engaging with only traditional forms, "The inability to skip parts of the work, go to the end, or go back a few pages, or even know where the beginning or end are, are things the reader of hypertext fiction will miss about reading print literature."

In Greg Ulmer's 1997 review, he found Twelve Blue to be expertly crafted and cognitively challenging. He regarded this piece as being the epitome of what digital literature should be, "Twelve Blue is an excellent example of this inversion of the literate hierarchy among the basic modes and styles, in that all the features of the diegetic world are put in service of the figurative creation of an atmosphere, a mood, a feeling, in the manner of a poem."
