= ACM Conference on Hypertext and Social Media =

Annual international conference

- Abbreviation: Hypertext, HT
- Discipline: Human-Computer Interaction, Hypertext, Hypermedia, Information Science

Publication details
- Publisher: Association for Computing Machinery
- History: 1987-present
- Frequency: Annual

The ACM Conference on Hypertext and Social Media (previously ACM conference on Hypertext and hypermedia, ACM Hypertext) is one of the oldest international conference series on the crossroads of Human-Computer Interaction and Information Science. The full list of conferences in the series can be found on the Association for Computing Machinery Hypertext Web page, and papers are available through the ACM Digital Library.

== History ==
The modern ACM Hypertext conference has its roots in the US-based Hypertext (HT) conference (1987, 1989) and European Conference on Hypertext (ECHT) (1990), coming together in 1991 under the organisation of Association for Computing Machinery Special Interest Group SIGLINK (renamed ACM SIGWEB in 1998) with the name ACM Hypertext and Hypermedia.

The conference has been notable for being open to literary authors and scholars in addition to computer scientists. This made it an important space for the development of early hypertext fiction and digital poetry. At the first Hypertext conference, in 1987, both the hypertext authoring system Storyspace and one of the first works of hypertext fiction, Afternoon, a story, were presented in public for the first time. In the 1990s, Deena Larsen and other authors of electronic literature hosted pre-conference Hypertext Writers' Workshops that were important community-building events.

The scope of the conference has been gradually expanded to include the World Wide Web and other types of information-linking systems, and in 2012 the conference changed its name to reflect this widened scope to become the ACM Conference on Hypertext and Social Media.

== Awards ==
The ACM Conference on Hypertext and Social Media has two named best paper awards that are given out annually: the Douglas Engelbart Best Paper Award and the Ted Nelson Newcomer Award.
