= Internet genre =

Internet genre refers to a type of genre explored in multimedia studies. Others include film genre, video game genres and music genre. Genre, in terms of genre studies refers to the method based on similarities in the narrative elements from which media-texts are constructed.

== Types of Internet genres ==
There are various genres of Internet services.

=== Personal homepage ===
Personal homepages are regularly updated, allows people to connect with those that they know through leaving messages and joining buddylists.

=== Message boards ===
A message board is one of the most familiar genres of online gathering place, which is asynchronous, meaning people do not have to be in the same place at the same time to have a conversation. With this genre posts can be accessed at any time and it is easy to ignore undesirable content.

=== E-mail lists and newsletters ===
An electronic mailing list or email list is a special usage of email that allows for widespread distribution of information to many Internet users. It is the easiestkind of online gathering place to create, maintain and participate.

=== Chat groups ===
Chat Group, where people can chat synchronously, communicating in the same place at the same time. Many micro-blogging platforms now function like chat groups, such as Twitter. The first online chat system was called Talkomatic, created by Doug Brown and David R. Woolley in 1973 on the PLATO System at the University of Illinois. It offered several channels, each of which could accommodate up to five people, with messages appearing on all users' screens character-by-character as they were typed. Talkomatic was very popular among PLATO users into the mid-1980s.

=== Virtual worlds ===
A virtual world takes the form of a computer-based simulated environment through which users can interact with one another and use and create objects. The term has become largely synonymous with interactive 3D virtual environments, where the users take the form of avatars visible to others.

=== Weblogs and directories ===
Weblogs exist when the owner, who is referred to as a 'blogger', invites others to comment on what they have written. The emergence and growth of blogs in the late 1990s coincided with the advent of web publishing tools that facilitated the posting of content by non-technical users. (Previously, a knowledge of such technologies as HTML and FTP had been required to publish content on the Web).

=== Wikis and hypertext fiction ===
A wiki is a collaborative page-editing tool in which users may add or edit content directly through their web browser The Wiki can be seen to have a similar structure to hypertext fiction systems, where the owner of the site invites individuals to add nodes to the system and link them together. Hypertext fiction has resurged with the launch of NeverEndingStory.co.uk in 2006, though it has existed since at least since 1987 when Michael Joyce's Afternoon, a story was launched.
