= UMAP =

UMAP may refer to:

- International Conference on User Modeling, Adaptation, and Personalization
- Military Units to Aid Production
- University Mobility in Asia and the Pacific
- Uniform Manifold Approximation and Projection
