= Daniela Côrtes Maduro =

- Education: Bachelor of Arts
- Occupation: Researcher

Portuguese theorist Daniela Côrtes Maduro is a researcher focused on digital and experimental literature. Côrtes Maduro has been a researcher w/Po-ex.net & CELL. She chaired and curated Shapeshifting Texts at the University of Bremen/Universität Bremen) as part of her research into multimodal, experimental storytelling.

== Early life and education ==
Côrtes Maduro holds a Bachelor of Arts degree in German and English languages and literatures. She wrote her master thesis, A creature made of bits: Illusion and Materiality in the Hyperfiction Patchwork Girl by Shelley Jackson for the University of Coimbra in Portugal for her MA in Anglo-American studies. After this, she was awarded an individual doctoral grant by the Portuguese Foundation for Science and Technology (FCT, 2011) to complete her PhD in Materialities of Literature (project “Immersion and Interactivity in Digital Fiction”) at the University of Coimbra, Portugal. In 2022, she finished her Master in Editorial Studies (University of Aveiro, Portugal). She was a postdoctoral fellow at the University of Bremen for electronic literature.

== Research and career ==
Côrtes Maduro has been working with the Center for Portuguese Literature at the University of Coimbra, first as a PhD-fellow, and then as a postdoctoral researcher. She was a Marie Skłodowska-Curie Actions fellow at the University of Bremen.

Her research interests lie in the study of science fiction; storytelling; experimental and electronic literature; narratology; literary analysis; editorial studies; subversive children's literature; digital fiction; archive, preservation and curation of literature. She is an associate researcher of the Consortium on Electronic Literature and worked at the University of Bremen, where her project, "Shapeshifting Texts: keeping track of electronic literature," was developed with the support of the university and the Marie Skłodowska-Curie Actions Research Fellowship Programme. In 2020, she worked on the project: No Problem HAs a Solution: A digital Archive of the Book of Disquiet in the Center for Portuguese Literature in the University of Coimbra.

She currently works at the Centre for Portuguese Literature (group Digital Mediation and Materialities of Literature) hosted by the University of Coimbra. Together with Manuel Portela, Alex Saum-Pascual and Rui Torres, she is the co-chair of the Electronic Literature Organization's Electronic Literature Conference and Media Festival 2023 - Overcoming Divides-Electronic Literature and Social Change (Coimbra, Portugal).

== Publications ==
- Daniela Côrtes Maduro e Manuel Portela (2022). Cibertextualidades, volume 4, Re-Auto-Meta Arquivo, Formas e Transformações do Arquivo. Porto: Universidade Fernando Pessoa. Book series edited by Rui Torres.
- Marie-Laure Ryan (2022). Narrativa e Estudos Mediáticos [translation of Marie-Laure Ryan's essays into Portuguese], edited by Carlos Reis, Ana Teresa Peixinho and Daniela Côrtes Maduro. Santo Tirso: De Facto Editores.
- Rui Torres and Daniela Côrtes Maduro (2021). “Wreadings: Digital Poetry and Collaborative Practice”, in The Community and the Algorithm: A Digital Interactive Poetics, edited by Andrew Klobukar. Wilmington: Vernon Press.
- Daniela Côrtes Maduro (2019). “Entre literatura e revolução: a poesia experimental Portuguesa” [Between Literature and Revolution: the Portuguese Experimental Literature], in Colóquio/ Letras. Lisboa: Fundação Calouste Gulbenkian, pp. 160–170. Print. Peer review. H-index 2, Q4.
- Daniela Côrtes Maduro (2017). Digital Media and Textuality: from Creation to Archiving. Bielefeld: [transcript] Verlag. Book series Media Upheavals, edited by Peter Gendolla and Jörgen Schäfer.
- Daniela Côrtes Maduro (2017). “Curating Shapeshifting Texts,” in Digital Media and Textuality: from Creation to Archiving, edited by Daniela Côrtes Maduro. Bielefeld: [transcript] Verlag, pp. 249–265. Now also available at (open access).
- Daniela Côrtes Maduro (2017). “Choice and Disbelief: Revisiting Immersion and Interactivity,” in Digital Media and Textuality, edited by Daniela Côrtes Maduro. Bielefeld: [transcript] Verlag, pp. 107–130. Bielefeld, Germany: [transcript] Verlag. Now also available at (open access):
- Daniela Maduro (2017). “Entre textões e escritões: a narrativa projetada [Between textons and scriptons: the projected narrative],” in Narrativa e Media: géneros, figuras e contextos, edited by Ana Teresa Peixinho and Bruno Araújo. Coimbra: Imprensa da Universidade de Coimbra, pp. 345–375.
- Daniela Côrtes Maduro (2016). “Interactividade cognitiva: o papel do leitor na literatura electrónica [Cognitive interactivity: the reader’s role in electronic literature],” in Cartografia das fronteiras da narrativa audiovisual, edited by Maria Guilhermina Castro, Carlos Sena Caires, Daniel Ribas, Jorge Palinhos. Porto: Universidade Católica Portuguesa, pp. 138–147.

== Awards and honors ==
- 2015–2017: BremenTRAC-Marie Skłodowska-Curie Actions Research Fellowship Programme. Project: “Shapeshifting Texts: Keeping Track of Electronic Literature.” Universität Bremen, Germany.
- April 2016 – July 2017: M8 Postdoc-Initiative PLUS funding program – Excellence Initiative, Deutsche Forschungsgemeinschaft. Universität Bremen, Germany.
- 2011–2014: Portuguese Foundation for Science and Technology (FCT) – Individual Doctoral Grant, project “Immersion and interactivity in digital fiction” (SFRH/BD/79458/2011). Call for PhD Studentships 2011 (national call). Centre for Portuguese Literature (CLP). Universidade de Coimbra, Portugal.
