= Tinderbox (application software) =

Note-keeping software

- Developer: Eastgate Systems
- Release: 2002; 24 years ago
- Stable release: 10.2.0 / May 2025; 1 year ago
- Operating system: Mac OS, Mac OS X
- Type: Content management, outliner, personal information manager
- License: Proprietary
- Website: www.eastgate.com/Tinderbox/

Tinderbox is a personal content management system and personal knowledge base.

It is a tool for storing, arranging, exploring, and publishing data.

== Developer ==
Tinderbox was developed for Mac OS and Mac OS X by Mark Bernstein, Chief Engineer of Eastgate Systems.

== Features ==
Its functions include storing and organizing notes, plans, and ideas, and sharing ideas through blogs. Novelist Giles Foden describes its hypertextual features as useful for pattern-making when planning a novel, as well as for organising research notes.

It also offers functionality similar to that of outliner and spatial hypertext/mind mapping tools, in addition to knowledge management, database and agent (persistent search) tools.

Tinderbox is used for a wide variety of tasks:

- As a personal web publishing system, with good support for blog creation and management
- Personal information management
- Outlining and mind mapping
- Concept mapping
- Note-taking
- Plot and story construction and writing
- Creating hypertexts
