= Forward Anywhere =

Forward Anywhere is a hypertext narrative created by writer Judy Malloy and scientist Cathy Marshall and published by Eastgate Systems. They started working together in 1993 through the PAIR (PARC artist-in-residence) program at the Xerox Palo Alto Research Center. Malloy and Marshall were one of the first and only pairings of two women in the program "created to bring together scientists and artists, with the hope of initiating a dialog between the two communities, and creating what PAIR program director Rich Gold described as 'new art' and 'new research.'" The pair wrote of their experience working together in the article, "Closure Was Never a Goal in this Piece", explicating their collaboration process and the connections found between each other.

== Origins ==
Forward Anywhere began as a compilation of emails sent back and forth between Judy Malloy and Cathy Marshall. When starting this project, the pair had to choose between creating a fictional or nonfictional project; they decided to use events from their own lives and allow the similarities come out from their writings naturally. Of these connections, Marshall stated, "What we did the blending of two real lives-seems more extraordinary. Rereading the mystery-filled unfolding of our oddly linked lives still sometimes sends chills down my spine." The pair initially employed email as a collaboration system because it was unrealistic to meet face to face, but quickly realized the new media's ability to properly reveal the hypertextuality of conversations. Marshall realized that "email seems like a naturally hypertextual form with its splitting and merging threads of conversation, its subjects that recur and re-emerge, and its tendency to discourage linearity and closure." Through the hypertext structure of this piece, both authors are able to reveal their own independent voice, rather than a combination of the two. Thus, the narrative shows similar events at the same time from different points of view.

== Web site structure ==
The structure of this site is arbitrary and unpredictable. The index page lays out six different options as to where the user will navigate through the site. Moving forward, every page past the index contains three options on linked words: "forward", "anywhere", and "lines". Selecting "forward" will continue the current story a single slide. "Anywhere" takes you to an arbitrary page, and "lines" allows the user to search for a certain word within the narrative. Furthermore, it allows the user to search for a word within the narrative, and the website algorithm selects lines from various parts with that word for a new slide. In doing so, the user has a voice in the narration of the website. These functions reveal the interconnected lives of two women, as well as the user.

== Influences ==
This hypertext narrative reflects the historical imaginings of Jorge Borges and Vannevar Bush. In regards to the organization of information, Borges imagines "a labyrinth that folds back upon itself in infinite regression" making the reader of his Garden of Forking Paths "become aware of all the possible choices we might make", while Bush imagines "a challenging maze, waiting to be solved by an appropriately organized and clever team effort." Forward Anywhere reveals a synthesis of both concepts, employing the possibilities for choice and regression per Borges and the collaborative effort for an organized maze of experience per Bush. Lev Manovich, author, professor, and artist in the field of new media, summarizes this synthesis of Borges' artistic approach and Bush's scientific approach, stating, "Both contain the idea of a massive branching structure as a better way to organize data and to represent human experience." The hypertext narrative Forward Anywhere demonstrates this massive branching structure through its 'Forward', 'Anywhere', and 'Lines' functions, organizing the human experiences of Malloy and Marshall while still representing the interconnecting nature of conversation and memory.

== Archives ==
Forward Anywhere is archived in The NEXT Museum, Library, and Preservation Space at Washington State University in Vancouver.
