= Robert Kendall (poet) =

American poet

- Born: Canada
- Writing career
- Genres: Electronic literature American
- Subject: Digital poet
- Notable work: Life Set for Two (1999)

Robert Kendall is a digital poet. Canadian-born, he now lives in the United States. He has a master's degree in Musicology and has taught electronic poetry for the New School University's online course.

In 1990, he used MS-DOS to create two 'kinetic poems', The Clue: a MiniMystery and It all Comes Down to ________. Kendall refers to these two early poems as "SoftPoems", in which words and phrases are animated to match movement with meaning. In 1996, he used Visual Basic to create a book-length hypertext poem, A Life Set for Two. Kendall has also created work for Flash and the World Wide Web. Kendall is on the board of directors for the Electronic Literature Organization.

== Works ==
Robert Kendall's works are collected in the NEXT Museum, Library, and Preservation Space. His archives are at Duke University.

- Kendall, Robert (2006). Logoza.
- Kendall, Robert (2004). Candles for a Street Corner. A work of multimedia poetry.
- Kendall, Robert (2002). Clues. A work of detective noir interactive poetry.
- Kendall, Robert (2001). Faith. A work of kinetic concrete poetry.
- Kendall, Robert (2000). A Study in Shades. A two-part poem about dealing with Alzheimer's disease.
- Kendall, Robert (1996). A Life Set for Two. Eastgate Systems, Inc.
- Kendall, Robert (1992). A Wandering City. Issue 33 of CSU poetry series. Cleveland State University Poetry Center. ISBN 0-914946-86-2.

== See also ==
- Eastgate Systems
- Hypertext
