= Light-Water: a Mosaic of Meditations =

Light-Water: a Mosaic of Meditations is a "hypermedia work" that utilizes and layers images and poetry to "create a striking experience of poetic meditation." Created by Christy Sheffield Sanford in 1999, the work consists of ten poems that produce a "visual-literal meditation on light and water." Through the implementation of timelines within the poems and overall work, Light-Water illustrates how "space-time possibilities for literature can now be more adequately realized through the use of spatio-temporal dhtml editors."

== Origins and influences ==
Sanford used Adobe Dreamweaver to complete this body of work, and this specific software allowed her to create a complicated, operational, and dynamic html scripting. Sanford said "special emphasis was placed on creating Timelines...Timelines were used to explore the kinetic properties/spirit of light and water."

== Publication history ==
Light-Water was originally published in 1999 in an online journal by The New River. Through the use of the software Dreamweaver, this work exists on a web browser and is coded as a Dynamic HTML, or DHTML. As of 2022, this piece is accessible through the Electronic Literature Organization's The NEXT: Museum, Library, and Preservation Space, hosted at Washington State University Vancouver in Washington US. On the ELO Next's webpage, they note how "Amanda Hodes transferred the files for this copy to Dene Grigar in June 2022." While most of Sanford's works are no longer available or discoverable online, Light-Water remains accessible online and still remains the same as its original version and formatting.

== Plot ==
Light-Water: a Mosaic of Meditations connects and emphasizes the natural and synthetic natures of light and water. Sanford uses the images to convey the message and help the reader visualize her poetic descriptions. With ten different poems, Cristy Sheffield Sanford creates a calming peace by looking at life through the lens of water and light. She details how light and water not only affect human life, but plant life and the entire view of the world. She uses various light sources like street lights, colorful stop lights, fire, and the moon to illustrate how everything we see, in life and in her work, has a purpose and is beautifully made or destroyed.

== Story structure and navigation ==
The reader can enter the story by clicking on the image titles of one of the ten poems shown at the starting, mosaic title page. In each node and poem page, the reader can transition to the other poems through the linked titles of other poems at the bottom of the page. The three links at the bottom always include a link to the "Mosaic" title page in the middle and two different poems on either side of it. There is only one functional hypertext linked phrase within the text of the ten poems, and this link is located in the poem titled "Sweat". The navigation is simple and consistent, but it allows the reader to create their own path or follow a constructed sequence. Memmott notes how "For the most part, images are on equal ground with words -- there is little difference in the formal treatments of text and image. Images are intended to be metabolized as text, are meant as text -- are text. Vice versa."

== Genre ==
This piece contains 10 poems. Light-Water is Electronic literature since it was created "using advanced web-techniques" and exists solely online through the web.

== Critical reception ==
Describing the works in The New River, Timothy Luke and Jeremy Hunsinger said that the "combination of the visual and the literal is central to the direction of hypermedia" and that it is a creative synthesis between the reader and the work due to the blend of moving images and textual literature. In a critique titled "Mise en Place: Hypersensual Textility and Poly-vocal Narration," Talan Memmott said Sanford uses images and text interchangeably, creating metaphorical visuals by overlapping the text and images. He said that "the reader must not only read in a literary sense, but is asked to interpret the design, the contrasts, and interact with images and emergent metaphor. It is impressive just how much 'textility' images maintain in these works." The Electronic Literature Organization, the principle organization that promotes and supports e-lit, said that, "Sanford's visual lushness opened up radical new possibilities for the look of the screen and the combination of merged image, movement, and text."
