= Half Life (Jackson novel) =

2006 novel by Shelley Jackson

- First edition cover
- Author: Shelley Jackson
- Cover artist: Jacket design by Roberto de Vicq de Cumptich
- Language: English
- Genre: Novel, alternate history
- Publisher: HarperCollins
- Publication date: July 25, 2006
- Publication place: United States
- Media type: Print (hardback & paperback)
- Pages: 440 pp (first edition, hardcover)
- ISBN: 978-0-06-088235-8 (first edition, hardcover)
- OCLC: 63165002
- Dewey Decimal: 813/.54 22
- LC Class: PS3560.A2448 H35 2006

Half Life is the 2006 debut novel of American writer and artist Shelley Jackson. The novel presupposes an alternate history in which the atomic bomb resulted in a genetic preponderance of conjoined twins, who eventually become a minority subculture.

== Overview ==
The book tells the story of a disenchanted conjoined twin named Nora Olney who plots to have her twin murdered.

== Reception ==
Half Life received mixed-to-positive reviews; Newsweek called it "brilliant and funny," and The New York Times, while praising Jackson's ambition as "truly glorious," added that "All this razzle-dazzle, all the allusions, [and] the narrative loop-de-loops [get] a bit busy." It won the 2006 James Tiptree, Jr. Award for science fiction and fantasy.
