= Tramway (digital poem) =

Digital poem by Alexandra Saemmer

- Author: Alexandra Saemmer
- Language: French
- Genres: Digital poetry, Electronic literature
- Publication date: 2000, revised 2009
- Publication place: France
- Media type: Web

Tramway is a combinatorial and interactive poem by Alexandra Saemmer, first published in 2000 and recreated in 2009. Its central theme is the act of closing the eyes of her father on his death. Tramway, by Alexandra Saemmer is a multimedia hypertext work based on her experiences with her father's death. This work is a notable use of Flash as a transitory medium and the content was designed to degrade as computing power increased. It is written in French.

== Interactivity and form ==
Tramway presents the text in the form of text boxes resembling old PC browser windows. By closing a text window, multiple other text windows appear, which means it's not possible to read all the text windows displayed on the screen, as closing a text box removes all boxes from the screen and produces new ones. The narration does not follow a temporal organization; the reader must find their own path. Bouchardon relates in his review that that this is an interactive story where the reader's gestures and choices create different pathways and journeys through the text.

Tramway plays upon the lability, or constant change, that is inherent to the digital computer by adapting the speed with which the work performs to the processing speed of the reader's computer. Faster computers will make the work almost impossible to read. This has been compared to the way that William Gibson's digital poem Agrippa (1992) is intentionally impossible to read.

Leonardo Flores featured this work in I Love Epoetry. Flores compares the content of the work as a commentary on the fragility of human bodies with the fragility of the work's media as well. The work's timing depends on a computer processor speed, so faster computers render the work illegible. Further the Flash software is now deprecated. As Flores explains, "This mechanism of memory wants to disappear in time, like William Gibson’s “Agrippa,” perhaps because memories fade and make room for peace."

== Publication and reception ==
Tramway was published in March, 2009 in Issue 2 of bleuOrange as a Flash Art piece. Washington State University's Electronic Literature Lab translated this work into Conifer, a preservation program in 2021. This work is currently available through The NEXT: Museum, Library and Preservation Space.

Tramway was featured in ALNNT2 Laboratoire de recherche sur les arts et les litteratures numeriques. This work is noted in European Electronic Literature.

Tramway was published in the French-Canadian journal BleuOrange: revue de littérature hypermédiatique and in the ELMCIP Anthology of European Electronic Literature. It has also been taught in French high schools.

In his keynote for the Electronic Literature Organization conference in 2018, Serge Bouchardon used Tramway as a prime example of artists addressing technological obsolescence by re-writing and re-imagining the artwork again. The work has also been analysed by Lydia Tuan.
