= Patchwork Girl (hypertext) =

Work of electronic literature by Shelley Jackson

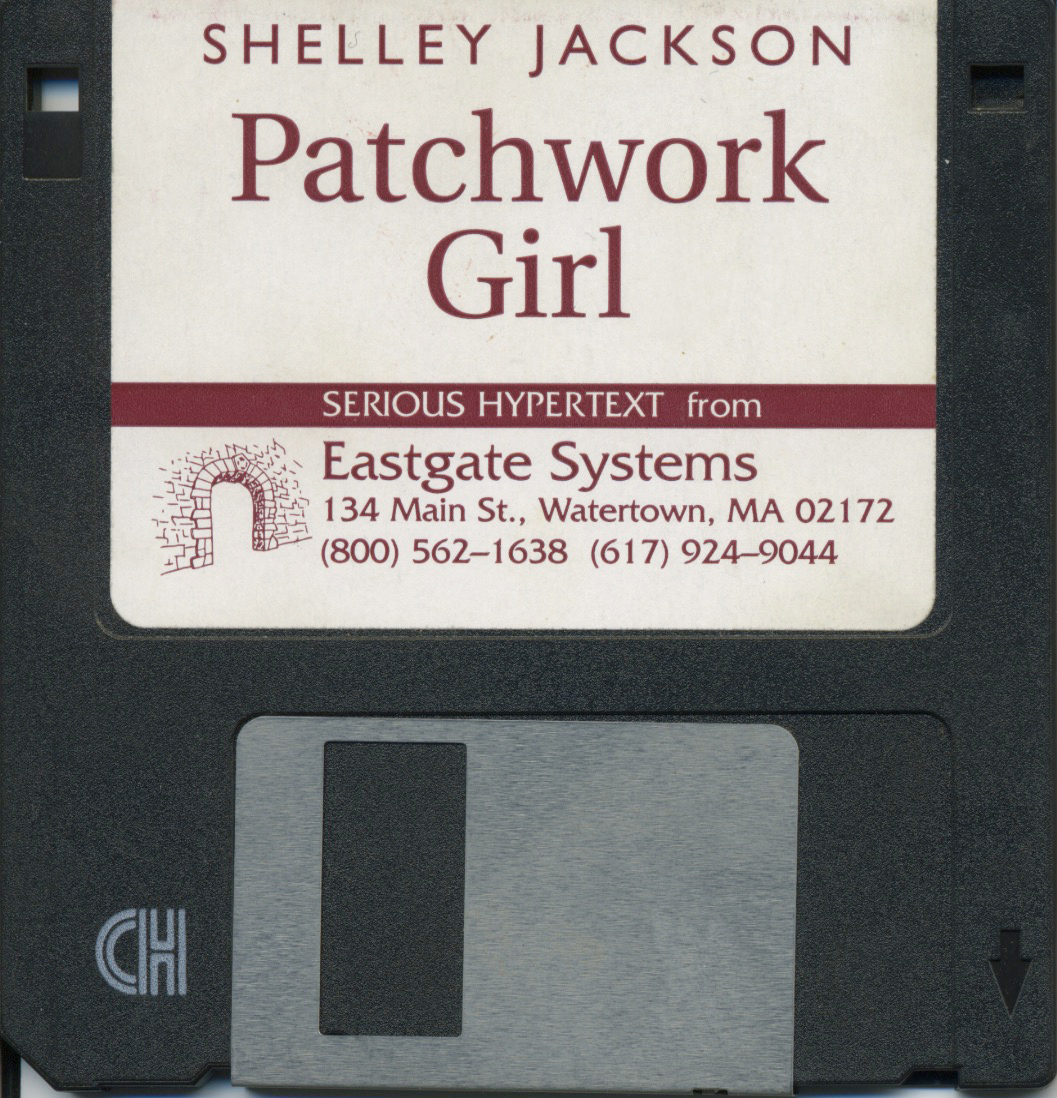
- The first edition of the work was published on floppy disk.
- Author: Shelley Jackson
- Genre: Hypertext fiction
- Publisher: Eastgate Systems
- Publication date: October 1995
- Publication place: USA

Patchwork Girl or a Modern Monster by Mary/Shelley and Herself is a work of electronic literature by American author Shelley Jackson. It was written in Storyspace and published by Eastgate Systems in 1995. It is often discussed along with Michael Joyce's afternoon, a story as an important work of hypertext fiction.

"Shelley Jackson's brilliantly realized hypertext Patchwork Girl is an electronic fiction that manages to be at once highly original and intensely parasitic on its print predecessors."

== Plot and structure ==
Jackson's Patchwork Girl tells the story through illustrations of parts of a female body stitched together through text and image. The narrative of the story is divided into five segments, titled: "a Graveyard", "a Journal", "a Quilt", "a Story", and "& broken accents." These five sections each use a different structure and are written in a different style. The goal of the piece is to not only make the reader realize the structure of the Patchwork Girl as a whole but also realize all the pieces that must be "patched" together in order to create one unified structure. Each segment leads down a trail that takes the story in multiple directions through various linking words and images. Jackson uses recurring graveyard imagery in order to continually invite the reader to resurrect Mary Shelley's monster.

In Mary Shelley's original, Victor Frankenstein begins the creation of a female companion for his monster but destroys the second effort prior to completion. In Jackson's version, the female monster is completed by Mary Shelley herself. The woman and her creation become lovers; the creature then travels to America, where she pursues a variety of adventures before disintegrating after a 175-year lifetime. Individual sections also explore the lives of some of the women whose corpses contributed body parts to the creature. The work is an often-cited example of cyberfeminism— "If you want to see the whole," one passage reads, "you will have to sew me together yourself." Furthermore, Jackson's use of hypertext "enables us to recognize the degree to which the qualities of collage— particularly those of appropriation, assemblage, concatenation, and the blurring of limits, edges, and borders— characterize a good deal of the way we conceive of gender and identity."

In reflecting on the structural impact of hypertext on Patchwork Girl, Jackson wrote:

In hypertext, everything is there at once and equally weighted. It is a body whose brain is dispersed throughout the cells, fraught with potential, fragile with indecision, or rather strong in foregoing decisions, the way a vine will bend but a tree can fall down.

== Influences ==
The narrative is based on two books: Mary Shelley's Frankenstein and The Patchwork Girl of Oz by L. Frank Baum. The first draft was produced for a Brown University course taught by George Landow.

Jackson's work includes quotations from the novels of both Shelley and Baum, plus material from Jacques Derrida, Donna Haraway, and other writers.

Patchwork Girl is categorized as a Borgesian structure of information, due to its non-linearity. The work reflects the hypertext labyrinth originally expressed in Borges' "Garden of Forking Paths" since the choices in the narrative allow multiple paths of experience.

=== The Gothic ===
Patchwork Girl is a continuation of Mary Shelley's Frankenstein, and therefore definitively a Gothic tale. There is much emphasis placed on the gruesome sewing-together of Patchwork Girl and the functioning of her borrowed body. The structure and the content of the text closely reflect one another because of the piecing-together of Patchwork Girl's physical self features in the narrative as well as the interactive element of the hypertext.

== Publication history ==
This work was first produced on Eastgate Systems' StorySpace platform and published in 1995, and re-released on a flash drive in 2015. This was featured in The NEXT Museum, Library, and Preservation Space as it is "viewed by many as the high point of hypertext literature in the pre-web period of the early digital age."

== Reception ==
Jaishree Odin examined the feminist influences and gender readings in this work in her essay, "Embodiment and Narrative Performance." in Women, Technology, and Art (edited by Judy Malloy, 2003).

George Landow reviewed Patchwork Girl extensively in several essays and summarizes these analyses in his 2006 textbook, Hypertext 3.0. and explains how this work uses a digital collage of theses, techniques, and words and images, including other writers such as Mary Shelley, L. Frank. Baum and Jacques Derrida.

Marjorie Luesebrink analyzed Patchwork Girl as a landmark innovation in Patchwork Girl was analyzed in "Women Innovate: Contributions to Electronic Literature (1990-2010).

Alice Bell extensively reviews Patchwork Girl in Bell The Possible Worlds of Hypertext Fiction. Bell notes the reliance on the readers' familiarity with Mary Shelley's Frankenstein to understand the narrative changes that Jackson creates, as she states "the text presents reading as an organic and unpredictable process which can be dramatically enriched by knowledge of other sources."

Daniel Punday compares Michael Joyce's work afternoon with Patchwork Girl and notes that Joyce controls reader's navigation (you can not access this content unless you have seen that content) whereas Shelley lets readers travel freely through the work.

Astrid Ensslin's work, Pre-web Digital Publishing and the Lore of Electronic Literature 2022 examines the history of this work.

Daniela Côrtes Maduro wrote her master's thesis on this work: A creature made of bits: Illusion and Materiality in the Hyperfiction Patchwork Girl by Shelley Jackson (University of Coimbra, Portugal)

== Award nominations ==
Patchwork Girl was shortlisted for the Electronic Literature Organization fiction award in 2001.
