= Eastgate Systems =

Hypertext publisher

Eastgate Systems, Inc.
- Type: Corporation
- Industry: Electronic publishing, Educational technology, Software publishing
- Founded: December 1982
- Headquarters: Watertown, Massachusetts
- Key people: Mark Bernstein
- Products: Storyspace, Tinderbox, Hypertext fiction, Electronic literature
- Website: www.eastgate.com

Eastgate Systems, Inc. is an American electronic publishing and software company headquartered in Watertown, Massachusetts Founded in 1982 by Mark Bernstein, the company is known for its role in the development of hypertext publishing and electronic literature.

Eastgate became one of the best-known publishers of hypertext fiction through works such as afternoon, a story by Michael Joyce and Patchwork Girl by Shelley Jackson. The company publishes fiction, non-fiction, and poetry in hypertext formats and has developed software tools including Storyspace and Tinderbox.

It publishes fiction, non-fiction, and poetry hypertexts by established authors with careers in print, as well as new authors. Its software tools include Storyspace, a hypertext system created by Jay David Bolter, Michael Joyce and John B. Smith, in which much early hypertext fiction was written.

== History ==
Eastgate Systems was founded by Mark Bernstein in 1982 and developed hypertext tools. Joyce and Bolter launched Storyspace in 1987, at the first annual Association for Computing Machinery (ACM) conference on Hypertext. Joyce presented afternoon, a story as a case-study for the tool; the work is widely considered the first work of hypertext fiction and was published by Eastgate in 1990. In 1995, Eastgate published Shelley Jackson's Patchwork Girl. These legacy works can be found in academic libraries though not all institutions maintain the now obsolete hardware required to interact with these titles. However, a number of specialized media labs, such as The NEXT Museum, Library, and Preservation Space, do maintain both the software and the hardware to read these works.

Eastgate has published series of works as hypertext journals, including the Eastgate Quarterly.

Robert Coover highlighted Eastgate as "the primary source for serious hypertext" in The New York Times Book Review in 1993, a quote which still features prominently in Eastgate's tagline. Between 1993-6, Eastgate published eight issues of The Eastgate Quarterly Review of Hypertext.

== Products ==
Eastgate developed several software tools associated with hypertext writing and research. Storyspace, created by Jay David Bolter, Michael Joyce, and John B. Smith, allowed authors to create nonlinear works using linked text nodes and visual maps. Storyspace writing environment consists of boxes (nodes) and arrows (named links) that show connections between nodes. Much early hypertext fiction was written using the platform.

The company later developed Tinderbox, a note-taking and content management application designed for organizing, analyzing, and visualizing interconnected information in a hypertextual environment.

== Publications ==
=== Fiction ===
- Michael Joyce: afternoon, a story (1987, 1990), Twilight, a Symphony (1996) (Storyspace)
- Sarah Smith: The King of Space (1991) (Hypergate)
- Judy Malloy and Cathy Marshall; Forward Anywhere
- Judy Malloy: its name was Penelope (1993) (Eastgate published the Storyspace version)
- Carolyn Guyer: Quibbling (1992)
- Stuart Moulthrop: Victory Garden (1992) (Storyspace, redone in The NEXT Museum, Library, and Preservation Space)
- Deena Larsen Marble Springs (1993), Century Cross (1994), Samplers—Nine vicious little hypertexts (1997)
- John McDaid: Uncle Buddy's Phantom Funhouse (HyperCard)
- Kathryn Cramer: In Small & Large Pieces (1994) (Storyspace)
- Shelley Jackson: Patchwork Girl (1995) (Storyspace)
- Bill Bly: We Descend, Volume One (1997) (Storyspace, Tinderbox)
- Richard Holeton: Figurski at Findhorn on Acid (2001) (Storyspace)
- J. Yellowlees Douglas: I have said nothing
- Kathleen McConnell under Kathy Mac: Unnatural Habitats
- Kathryn Cramer: In Small & Large Pieces
- Mary Kim Arnold: Lust
- Mark Bernstein: Those Trojan Girls (2016)
- Megan Heyward: Of day, of night (2004)
- Wes Chapman: Turning In
- Edward Falco: A Dream with Demons
- Rob Swigart: Down Time
- Tim McLaughlin: Notes Toward Absolute Zero
- Judith Kerman: Mothering (StorySpace)
- Richard Smyth:Genetis
- Clark Humphrey The Perfect Couple

=== Poetry ===
- Robert Kendall and Richard Smyth: A Life Set for Two (Visual Basic)
- Stephanie Strickland, True North (StorySpace)
- Jim Rosenberg, Integrams (Hypercard)

=== Non-fiction ===
- Roderick Coover:Cultures in Webs
- David Kolb: Socrates in the Labyrinth
- Diane Greco: Cyborg, engineering the body electric
- Eric Steinhart: Fragments of the Dionysian Body
- George Landow: Writing at the Edge; The Dickens Web;
- George Landow and Jon Lanestedt:The In Memoriam Web
- Guiliano Franco: Quam Artem Exerceas

== See also ==
- Electronic literature
- Hypertext fiction
