= No World 4 Tomorrow =

Digital poetry and art game

- Author: Lyle Skains
- Language: English
- Genre: Digital poetry, electronic literature
- Publication date: 2019
- Website: https://youandco2.org/NW4T/

No World 4 Tomorrow (NW4T) is a work of electronic literature by Dr. Lyle Skains created for the You & CO_{2} project. Released in 2019, the interactive poem uses digital elements and branching storylines to implore the reader to analyze daily environment-effecting choices they may make. NW4T was built with Sugarcube in Twine (software), an open-source application that combines HTML, CSS, and JavaScript to produce interactive stories.

== Plot and structure ==
Set in the distant future, the reader is one of many inhabitants of the Metra colony on the Moon. Metra's people range from Gen1s, the original settlers from Earth, Gen2s are the reader's parents while they and their friends are Gen3. Energy and food are rationed on a weekly basis, meat-based nutrition is rare, and transportation is limited. Rhiannon, a Gen1 senator, reduces all rations after struggling to communicate with their contacts on the increasingly uninhabitable Earth, sparking outrage.

Throughout the story, the conscious reader "must avoid an ecological catastrophe" with careful decision-making; it could be something as simple as walking instead of taking the monorail or staying up overnight to draft solutions to the energy and food crises. These meaningful decisions allow the reader to live the way they see fit and reflect on it in the end.

The reader's group can band together as conservationists, vying for positive environmental participation in the present and future. They can make the decision to comply with the Senate, making big changes that span diet, activities, and transportation. They could keep to themself and ignore the fragile environment surrounding them, disbanding the group in disapproval of the selfish actions. Lastly, the reader can join and contribute to the protests, overthrowing the Senate, running to replace them and start work on making Metra a permanent settlement.

== Gameplay and accessibility ==
NW4T as electronic literature uses digital elements such as links, images, and audio to enhance the passage-to-passage reading experience. Blue links indicate an overlay passage, providing additional context and/or images to the subject; additionally, they're used to cycle through words, prompting the user to make minor choices. Green links are focused on accessibility, hovering over complicated words or phrases simplifies and verbalizes them. Orange links are used to advance the story, taking the player to the next passage based on user input. These features not only tailor to the project's targeted 12-15 age range, but was made "in collaboration with a specialist in special needs education", aiming for an overall accessible experience.

== Reception ==
You & CO_{2} is a project created by Dr Jennifer Rudd, Dr. Lyle Skains, Dr. Ruth Horry, and Dr. Helen Ross to educate students about the impact everyday carbon dioxide emissions have on climate change through interactive digital literature. Throughout three multiliteracy workshops, students calculate then analyze strategies to reduce their carbon footprint, read and discuss their results in No World 4 Tomorrow, reflecting on "how the themes in the narrative relate to their lives", then design a personal interactive story to reflect on their attitudes towards climate change.

Institutions administering the three workshops to students have received strong engagement with the story and its digital elements, ultimately demonstrating increased literacy towards climate change and its effects at the end of the program. No World 4 Tomorrow is a work "designed to effect social change".
