= International Conference on User Modeling, Adaptation, and Personalization =

- Abbreviation: UMAP
- Discipline: User modeling, Adaptation, Personalization, Human-Computer Interaction, Artificial Intelligence

Publication details
- Publisher: Association for Computing Machinery
- History: 1986-present
- Frequency: Annual

The ACM International Conference on User Modeling, Adaptation, and Personalization (UMAP) is the oldest international conference for researchers and practitioners working on various kinds of user-adaptive computer systems such as Adaptive hypermedia systems, Recommender systems, Adaptive websites, Adaptive learning, Personalized learning and Intelligent tutoring systems and Personalized search systems. All of these systems adapt to their individual users, or to groups of users (i.e., Personalization). To achieve this goal, they collect and represent information about users or groups (i.e., User modeling).

The UMAP conferences have historically been organized under the auspices of User Modeling Inc., a professional organization of User Modeling researchers. Until 2015, the conference proceedings were published by Springer. In 2016, the UMAP conference series became affiliated with the Association for Computing Machinery (ACM), where it is supported by ACM SIGWEB and ACM SIGCHI.

== History ==
UMAP is the successor of the biennial conference series on User Modeling and Adaptive Hypermedia. The User Modeling series started in 1986 as the First International Workshop on User Modeling (UM) at Maria Laach, Germany and was first officially called a conference at the Fourth International Conference on User Modeling in Hyannis, Massachusetts. The last conference in the original series was UM 2007. The International Conference on Adaptive Hypermedia and Adaptive Web-based Systems (abbreviated as AH) started in 2000. The last conference in this original series was AH 2008, held in 2008. For several years between 2000 and 2008, UM and AH ran biennially in alternate years. In 2009, the conference series merged into a single annual series under the UMAP designation. The first UMAP conference was in 2009.

The full list of conferences in the series can be found on the UM Inc. website and in a timeline on the Springer publisher website.

== Examples of published research ==
Some research presented at UMAP has received attention in public media. Examples include work on social robot learning relationships between users' daily routines and emotional states, which has been reported in science and technology news coverage, as well as longitudinal studies of music listening behavior and personalization across the life span that have been described in popular science outlets.

Other UMAP papers have been discussed in government communications.
