= Alexandra Saemmer =

French author and professor

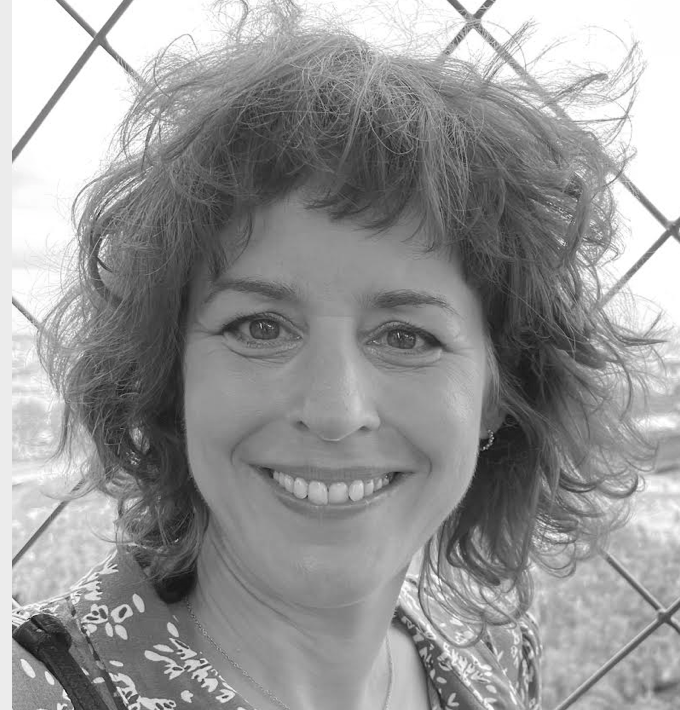
- Occupations: Writer, professor
- Writing career
- Period: 2000–present
- Genres: Electronic literature, digital poetry
- Notable works: Böhmische Dörfer, Tramway
- Scientific career
- Education: University of Lyon, University of Passau
- Fields: Social semiotics, electronic literature
- Workplaces: University of Paris 8 Vincennes-Saint-Denis
- Website: cemti.univ-paris8.fr?alexandra-saemmer

Alexandra Saemmer is a French professor known for social semiotic research focusing on electronic literature and digital media and for her literary works, in particular digital poetry and narratives created for social media.

== Academic career ==
Saemmer is a professor in Information and Communication Sciences at University of Paris 8 Vincennes-Saint-Denis. Prior to this post, she was an associate professor in the Department of Spanish and Portuguese at the University of California, Berkeley.

After writing a PhD thesis on the work of Marguerite Duras and Robert Musil, Saemmer has shifted her focus to the study of digital media and electronic literature in particular, developing terms in social semiotics specifically suited for analysing multimodal digital texts. Her explorations of the iconicity of digital media, where a sign may consist of multiple modes (e.g. a word and a sound at the same time), has been adopted by other scholars.

Her most-cited book as of 2023 is Rhétorique du texte numérique : figures de la lecture, anticipations de pratiques, which was published in 2015 and received reviews in several French academic journals.

Saemmer serves on the Literary Advisory Board for the Electronic Literature Organization.

== Research and critical work ==
Saemmer's critical research focuses on semiotics and rhetoric within software, design, and code. Her research work includes co-directing the Centre for Media, Technology and Internationalization Studies (CEMTI) where more than 40 researchers work on research relating to culture and communication.

== Digital poems ==
Saemmer's first poem, Tramway, was first published in 2000 and then recreated in 2009. Its central theme is the act of closing the eyes of her father on his death, and an often discussed point is its lability, that is its constant change, in particular the way the speed of reading changes according to the speed of the computer's processor, making the poem almost illegible on newer computers.

Another frequently discussed poem is Böhmische Dörfer (2011). This poem is about the forced evacuation of the Sudeten Germans during the winter of 1945, also known as the Brno death march. "Böhmische Dörfer" is written in the online presentation tool Prezi, and is thus another example of Saemmer's experimentation with new digital interfaces.

An article on French electronic literature in the weekly magazine L'Obs characterised Saemmer as among the most interesting poets in the genre.

== Social media novel ==
The Facebook novel Nouvelles de la Colonie has been discussed and analyzed in several articles both by Saemmer and by other scholars. The project, which is a collaboration with Sébastien Appiotti, Brice Quarante, Françoise Cahen, Françoise Chambefort, and Adrien Brunel, was also published as a traditional novel titled Logbook de la Colonie in 2022.
