= Clockwork Watch =

Transmedia Project

Clockwork Watch is a collaborative transmedia storytelling project set in a retro-futurist steampunk vision of Victorian England. Launched in May 2012, this five-year immersive participatory story is told through graphic novels, interactive promenade theatre, online adventures, an interactive book, and a feature film. The project was created and produced in London by Yomi Ayeni.

Ayeni got the idea for the project when co-organising a steampunk-themed party called Seductive Alchemy and realising that hardly any other black people attended. Clockwork Watch is set in a non-colonialist version of Victorian Britain, and aims to open up a steampunk storyworld that is inclusive to a broader audience, including Black British people and British Indians.

== Story ==
Clockwork Watch is set in a time when clockwork mechanics and science are the two most important developments in the world. Technological and social change are in the air – human-clockwork hybridisation is the talk of the town; the unwise employment of science has led to outcry and the public wants to know whether Science is about to play God.

The story is told through the eyes of Janav Ranbir, an 8 year old Indian boy who comes to England with his parents at the invitation of Queen Victoria. Janav's father - Chan Ranbir – is a leading kinetic engineer who is masterminding a new technology powering the production of clockwork servants. The story follows the development of these ‘Clocks’, focusing on the backlash that such advancements have with local labour and Victorian society. Chan's work causes his son to be estranged from the family and as Clocks continue to develop, so does Janav's hatred of them. In the final story we find a divided world, sentient Clocks demand equal rights through the Machine Liberation Front. At the same time Janav is handed the authority to mount a personal crusade against the one thing he blames for the moral decline of British society – Clocks themselves.

== Graphic novels and crowdfunding ==
The three-part graphic novel story introduces the steampunk world of Clockwork Watch. Each book acts as the jumping off point for all other narratives. The first novel, The Arrival, was launched in May 2012, the second novel, Breakaway, was launched in July 2013 and the third novel, Countenance, will be released in 2016. The graphic novels were written by Yomi Ayeni, adapted by Corey Brotherson, and hand illustrated by Jennie Gyllblad. All the books are self-published through Clockwork Watch Films.

The Arrival won the 2011 Best Crowdfunded Comic Campaign on IndieGoGo, and some of the patrons who funded the project were sketched into the graphic novel as characters. Cory Doctorow praised its "very rich" storyworld and the live events, although he noted that Arrival was rather short.

== Co-Created Storyworld ==
The Online world of Clockwork Watch uses a Creative Commons licence, to publish fortnightly updates from the story universe. The content is published under the guise of a fictional newspaper called "The London Gazette", through which participants are invited to create their own characters and story lines - interacting with news by contributing articles, photographs, videos, letters, even drawings showing how developments affect their characters in the Clockwork World. The best submissions following the story arc will be given Canon status, incorporated into the universe narrative, and the authors will be awarded a contributors credit on the website.

The background story of Clockwork Watch is made up of the original narrative, as well as contributions from participants who all retain ownership of their respective IP. The aim of this project is to create a sandpit where participants can experience a 'make believe' world, interact with the narrative, contribute to an alternate history, and propose creative adjustments to the story.

Readers and participants were also encouraged to create their own stories and products within the storyworld. Laser Lace Letters was the first independent project to launch from inside the Clockwork Watch storyworld. It is an artifact-based short story series, with quite a bit of handcrafting attached. The project is the brainchild of Haley Moore of Texas. The project raised $17,962 through Kickstarter crowdfunding in November 2012.

== Live events ==
Clockwork Watch launched with a Steampunk fair called ‘Tomorrow’s World... Today!’, staged in a disused arch under London Bridge Station, where with a re-created Victorian street market. People were invited to be participants in a spectacle that was part theatre, LARP and ARG. "During the event we launched the sale of our first graphic novel, Clockwork Watch: The Arrival. It featured some of the very people our audience had been interacting with for 9 hours, and followed on from the very world they’d been playing in. Some participants were tasked with reporting what they had witnessed via our storytelling portal.

The story also travelled to the Latitude Festival, where a fictional government department staged a Victorian Science Expo. The event featured a demonstration by striking trade unionists who barricaded the scientists in, and prevented curious members of the public from entering the roadshow unless they promised to help steal top secret documents. The UK live events were produced by Sam Howey Nunn and Louisa Norman.
