= Christy Sheffield Sanford =

American writer, artist, editor, and project designer

- Education: Antioch University
- Occupations: New media writer, artist, editor, and project designer
- Writing career
- Genre: Electronic literature
- Notable work: Light-Water: a Mosaic of Meditations

Christy Sheffield Sanford is an American new media writer, artist, editor, and project designer, who lives in Florida. She coined the term "web-specific" for her work.

== Early life and education ==
Sanford earned her master's degree in Creative Writing and Interarts from Antioch University, Ohio.

== Life and career ==
Before her web work starting in the 1990s, Sanford experimented with print forms. This segued into Sanford's artistic vision for the web to merge text and imagery while allowing "each art form to maintain its integrity." Frederick Barthelme noted that her early web work as a way to use the web to innovate literature.

trAce, in Nottingham-Trent University, was one of the first centers for new media writing. In 1998, as trAce's first virtual writer in residence, she designed and curated trAce's journal for new media literature, frAme Volumes 4 and 5, and wrote electronic literature works such as the Two Little Soldiers.

As an Alden B Dow Creativity Centre Fellow, at Northwood University, Michigan.

== Works and publications ==
Her small press books include The Italian Smoking Piece, The Cowrie Shell Piece, and the Hs: the Spasms of a Requiem, and Sur les Pointes, The Ballerina and the Sea Anemone, White Eagle Coffee Store Press; The Kiss, Radio Room Press; and The H's: the Spasms of a Requiem, Bloody Twin Press.

- Red Mona (a multimedia work of text, images, and sound, based on Petit Soldat by Guy de Maupassant)

Her digital animation poems include:

- Only the Nude Can Redeem the Landscape: Poems 1989
- Bride Thrashing Through History 1990
- Italian Smoking Piece: With Simultaneous Translation 1992
- Cowrie Shell Piece: (Baroque and Rococo Strains) 1991
- ~~Water~~Water~~Water~~ a collaboration with Reiner Strasser
- Light-Water: a Mosaic of Meditations 1999
- Nadine, a digital animation was shown in the 2018 Electronic Literature Organization Gallery in Montreal, Canada
- Birds of a Feather Collaborative Project with Debra Mixon Holliday Be Mine,” “Premium Assortment,” and “The Past and Her Muse: a Blazon”
- Peripheral Visions Daybook: (from Suspect to Offender and Back) Fusion Press, 2020
- The Fan Cycle: Mallarmé In Late Summer (Inverted), 2023

== Awards and honors ==
She has received 9 grants, including a National Endowments for the Arts (NEA) Fellowship and two NEA-Rockefeller sponsored grants.
