= Snack Time! =

- Developers: Renee Choba; Hardy the Bulldog
- Release: 2008
- Genre: Interactive fiction

Snack Time! is a 2008 interactive fiction work by Renee Choba, which she co-authored with Hardy the Bulldog, who also features as the player character (PC).

== Story ==
Snack Time! is played from the point of view of the bulldog, who must wake up its owner to be fed. To get a sandwich the player must complete five steps (each worth 5 points, for a total of 50 possible).The story game takes place in just a few rooms. The work presents concepts from the dog's point of view by using graphics.

== Development ==
Choba is an interactive fiction writer who has completed other interactive fiction works as well, coming in the form of "Stink or Swim" (2009) and "History Repeating" (2005), during which she collaborated with Mark Choba.

== Reception ==
Reviewers explained "What makes the game so charming is the way Choba (the author) exploits the fact that Hardy (the dog-PC) has a set of concepts that doesn't quite match the human player's. For that purpose, a dozen words are worth a thousand perfect 3D-renderings." They noted that " as your own dimwitted but lovable pet who you must influence with your canine abilities in order to satisfy your munchies."

SnackTime appears in recommended lists such as Cute Games, Surprising Sentience, Great games in a mostly realistic setting , and My apartment games.

=== Awards and honors ===
In 2008, Choba and Hardy were awarded the Best Individual PC award at the XYZZY Awards Ceremony, and Snack Time! was named 6th best interactive fiction work at the 14th Annual Interactive Fiction Competition in 2008.
