= Of day, of night =

Digital narrative by Megan Heyward published in 2000

- Author: Megan Heyward
- Language: English
- Genre: electronic literature
- Publisher: Eastgate Systems, Australian Film Commission
- Publication date: 2002, 2000
- Publication place: Australia

Of day, of night is an interactive digital story by Megan Heyward which uses hypertext and other digital elements to tell a meaningful narrative. It was first published in 2000 by the Australian Film Commission, and then published on CD-ROM by Eastgate Systems in 2002.

Heyward has been writing digital stories since 1997 with her first work I am a Singer. This story is one of six of Heyward's work and would help pave the way for future digital storytelling authors by incorporating innovative elements in a unique way.

== Origins and influences ==
In a video which was recorded in 2019 at Washington State University Vancouver, Heyward presented her story to an audience while giving commentary on her work. In her commentary, she compares her first work I am a Singer to of day, of night explaining their similarities and differences in being both hypertextual interactive narratives; I am a Singer and many other earlier works at the time mainly focused on hypertext as the digital focus of these narratives but of day, of night stands out with its use of sound, video, and images; the piece being made in 2001, published in 2002 means this is one of the first pieces of digital media that would incorporate elements of visuals from both video and images with sound and hypertext all put together to make a cohesive and interactive story, making Heyward a pioneer in the field of digital storytelling.

== Publication history ==
This piece of work was created with Macromedia Director (now known as Adobe Director) and was published in 2002 by Eastgate Systems, Inc.

== Plot ==
Unlike Heyward's other works, this narrative explores the relationship between memory, dreams, and objects. The reader follows a woman who has lost her ability to dream and plans on using objects found in random locations to help get her dreams back. Each location the woman explores is filled with multiple objects that the reader can click on and interact with which will prompt a video of the woman messing around with the object and investigating it.

The woman eventually comes across a small booklet filled with sketches and drawings of a plethora of different things ranging from notes, maps, drawings and magazine clippings. Once this area has been reached, the reader is then able to enter the second phase of the story: the night. This is done by accessing the ‘arrange’ section where the reader is prompted with a cabinet to sort and organize objects that have been previously interacted with. This section adds a great layer of interactivity for the reader as they sit and ponder which objects to use and where to place them. After the objects have been sorted the reader is then prompted with a video with dream-like qualities, transitioning the reader to the night section.

The night section as Heyward describes it threads together the objects and stories to create new meanings. In this section, the reader is prompted with numerous numbers which they can hover over and click on to reveal a video which plays a dream. This section really brings the whole piece together as the reader starts to see all the objects they interacted with and the imagined histories from the woman flow together.

== Story structure and navigation ==
The reader is presented with a map towards the beginning of the story and it is the choice of the reader to choose where to go. The story is broken up into sections where the next section is unlocked by visiting certain areas on the map and interacting with all the objects in said areas. The objects in each section are sometimes clickable which allows the reader to interact with them through visual and auditory elements. The areas available to the reader are few to begin with but grow as the reader progresses through the story.

In an interview at Washington State University Vancouver, Heyward discussed the techniques used for navigating through the story's sections. She talked about the feedback given in the form of visual and sound cues when the reader hovers their cursor over an object or a piece of hypertext. Heyward explained that this adds immersion to the piece, making the reader feel more involved or a part of the story. Heyward talked about how the sound provides flow to the work, adding to that immersion for the reader.

== Genre ==
This is known as hypertext fiction which is an art form praised for being highly innovative due to its structure and the delivery platform that it embraces.

=== Preservation and archiving ===
of day of night in its current state is difficult to access, as it requires older hardware and technology, which is not readily available. The Archiving Australian Media Arts Project is addressing the challenges of preserving digital media on obsolete platforms, such as Macromedia Director. The project aims to outline the benefits of making these materials available to partners and researchers of artworks. Access to these digital materials should improve in the future with digital emulation infrastructure set to be built.

A new-funded project, the Australian Emulation Network, aims to conserve born-digital artifacts, including of day of night. The first process that the project aims to use to solve this problem is to create disk images. The project also proposes to use emulation as a groundwork for recreating and experiencing of day of night.

=== Awards. ===
This work received high commendations from Australian digital media awards, including:

- AIMIA (Australian Interactive Media Industry Association) 2003.
- Adelaide Festival Awards for Literature.
- VIPER International New Media Competition Finalist 2002.
