= Notes on the Voyage of Owl and Girl =

Notes on the Voyage of Owl & Girl is a generative HTML work written by J.R. Carpenter. It debuted in 2013 and was printed in 2014. The work has little to no user input to control this story. The work includes some Morse code that can be translated into a message.

== Plot ==
The plot follows a girl and a talking owl who go off on a nautical adventure that takes place in various amounts of oceans and islands to chart the paths they take, but the chart keeps changing with each new generation of the work.

== Origins and influences ==
The story takes its inspiration from several stories from the previous 2,000+ years of nautical stories.

== Publication history ==
The debut of Notes on the Voyage of Owl & Girl is its launch. It was launched in January 2013 at the Avenues of Access: An Exhibit & Online Archive of New 'Born Digital' Literature held at the Modern Languages Association Convention in Boston hosted by Dene Grigar. It was published in HTML and is hosted on Carpenter's website.

The print iteration of the performance script was also published in Carpenter's book An Ocean of Static.

== Story structure and navigation ==
It is a generative work, which means the reader has no control or input on the story in any form. It can require the use of an external Morse code translator for certain points of the work.

It is linear with multiple aspects. The main story is told in a box at the left half of the screen while some images and words are cycled through the work. The reader will need patience when going through the work as it generates new text and images every 40 seconds.

== Literary significance and critical reception ==
It was highly commended for the Forward Prizes for Poetry 2019 and an excerpt from "Notes on the Voyage of Owl and Girl" was included in the Forward Prizes anthology that year.
