= ACM SIGWEB =

Association for Computing Machinery group

SIGWEB is a Special Interest Group of the Association for Computing Machinery (ACM) on hypertext, hypermedia, and the World Wide Web. SIGWEB was named SIGLINK until November 1998.

== Conferences ==
SIGWEB sponsors several conferences relating to hypertext and the World Wide Web. ACM SIGWEB core conferences are:

- The ACM Conference on Hypertext and Social Media (Hypertext)
- The ACM Web Conference (WebConf)
- The ACM Document Engineering Conference (DocEng)
- The ACM Web Science Conference (WebSci)
- The ACM International Conference on User Modeling, Adaptation, and Personalization (UMAP)
- The ACM Conference on Information and Knowledge Management (CIKM)
- The ACM/IEEE Joint Conference on Digital Libraries (JCDL)
- The ACM International Conference on Web Search and Data mining (WSDM)

ACM SIGWEB Cooperating Conferences are as the following:

- The ACM Conference on Recommender Systems (RecSys)
- The ACM Advanced Visual Interfaces (AVI)
- The International Conference on Cloud Computing and Services Science (CLOSER)
- The International Database Engineering & Applications Symposium (IDEAS)
- The International Conference on Learning Analytics & Knowledge (LAK)
- The International Web for All Conference (W4A)
- The International Conference on Web Studies (WS- Web Studies)
- The International Conference on Webmedia (Webmedia)
- The International Conference on Web Information Systems and Technologies (WEBIST)
- The ACM International Conference on Interactive Media Experiences (IMX)

== Awards ==
SIGWEB has three main awards that are given out annually: the Douglas Engelbart Best Paper Award, the Ted Nelson Newcomer Award, and the Vannevar Bush Best Paper Award.
