= Böhmische Dörfer =

2011 digital poem by Alexandra Saemmer

- Author: Alexandra Saemmer
- Language: French, German, English
- Genres: Digital poetry, Electronic literature
- Publication date: 2011
- Publication place: France
- Media type: Web, Prezi
- Website: https://prezi.com/m7lq5txsl5qz/bohmische-dorfer-english-version/

Böhmische Dörfer is a digital poem by Alexandra Saemmer about the forced evacuation of the Sudeten Germans during the winter of 1945, also known as the Brno death march.

== Topic of the poem ==
The title "Böhmische Dörfer" means Bohemian Villages. For Germans Bohemian Village is also the idiom to describe something they don't understand.

Saemmer's mother was one year old in 1945, and a survivor of the march.

== Interactivity and form ==
"Böhmische Dörfer" is written in the online presentation tool Prezi. Individual words and phrases are placed on a large canvas that the reader moves through by interacting with the Press presentation online. It is available in German, French and English versions.

The way the reader is forced to constantly move through the text of the poem parallels the forced march of the evacuees that "Böhmische Dörfer" describes. The spatial organisation of the digital poem thus mirrors the geographic displacement. A video in the background of the Prezi presentation shows a march in winter with sounds reminiscent of war.

== Reception ==
The poem has been discussed by a number of scholars, and is part of the Electronic Literature Collection volume 3 from the Electronic Literature Organization. It has been taught at universities as an example of electronic literature.
