= Snow (Jackson short story) =

Creative work by Shelley Jackson

- Author: Shelley Jackson
- Language: English
- Publication date: 2014

Snow is a short experimental story by Shelley Jackson begun in 2014. Jackson published Snow by writing one word at a time in the snow and taking a photograph of the word, which was then posted to Instagram and Flickr so readers could follow the project online. The work is usually referred to simply as "Snow", but its full title on Instagram is Snow: A story in progress, weather permitting, while on Flickr it is titled Snow: A story, weather permitting.

== About the work ==
The story is 805 words long, and begins with the sentence "'To approach snow too closely is to forget what it is,' said the girl who cried snowflakes."

After a failed attempt to write words in the snow in 2010, Jackson began properly in 2014. Due to a lack of snowy days in New York City, it was still only a few sentences long by 2018. Jackson published images of each word to her Flickr and Instagram accounts, and it is viewed both as a performance piece and a work of electronic literature.

== Reception ==
Snow has been analysed by several scholars of experimental literature and electronic literature. Its combination of physical performance and the "slow media" of the word-by-word posting to Instagram is frequently discussed. It has been compared to land art, and analysed as electronic literature. It is also often discussed as a work of ecofiction.

Søren Pold and Christian Ulrich Andersen argue that Snow reflects what they call the metainterface by connecting repeated experiences of weather to the larger issues of climate change, and that the apparent contradiction of the ephemerality of words written in snow against the apparent permanence of digital media creates "an experience of a dislocated writing".
