= Cathy Marshall (hypertext developer) =

Cathy Marshall is a Principal Researcher in Microsoft Research's Silicon Valley Lab and an author of electronic literature. Marshall is mainly interested in studying human interaction when mediated by technology. She is affiliated with the Center for Study of Digital Libraries at Texas A&M University. In her 20-year history working with hypertext, she has led a series of projects investigating analytical work practices and collaborative hypertext, including two system development projects, Aquanet (named after the hairspray) and VIKI. From her early experiences with hypertext, Marshall discovered the negative effects of having analysts work with formal representation. Marshall learned that information which does not fit in formal representation gets lost as people try to force it into this area.

== Career as a researcher ==
Marshall worked at Xerox PARC for 11 years and Fuji Xerox Palo Alto Lab for one year. Cathy Marshall was also an adjunct professor in the Computer Science Department at Texas A&M University.

== Literary work ==
Between 1993 and 1996, while working with PARC, Judy Malloy and Cathy Marshall collaborated on Forward Anywhere: Notes on an Exchange between Intersecting Lives, a hypernarrative work based on electronic communication that passed between the two in which they sought "to exchange the remembered and day-to-day substance of our lives". This collaborative work "has no final form; it never ended. In the essay, "Closure was never a goal in this piece," the two, (Judy Malloy and Cathy Marshall) share their experiences and thoughts about collaborating in "Forward Anywhere," excerpts of which can be found in the site itself.

Marshall's 2009 study and article "Do Tags Work?" (Eastgate Systems) examines the effectiveness of archive tagging on the internet. Her findings were that "people generally don't use verbs when tagging and that the titles and descriptions they write are almost always a more useful definition of the thing being tagged."

Her work Reading and Writing the Electronic Book (2009) explains how e-books draw from print traditions and examines new ways to read and new reading tools.

== Awards and keynotes ==
Marshall's papers received the best paper award for the American Computing Machine (ACM) Hypertext Conference in 1998 and 1999 and the Joint Conference on Digital Libraries (JCDL) best paper award in 1998 and 2008. She delivered keynotes at WWW, Hypertext, Usenix FAST, CNI, IVICA, ACH-ALLC, and a variety of other CS and LIS venues.

== Selected bibliography ==
- Forward Anywhere, Eastgate Systems (1993) with Judy Malloy
- Reading and Writing the Electronic Book, Morgan & Claypool (2009)
- Who Owns Social Media Content? (2016)
