= Richard Holeton =

American writer

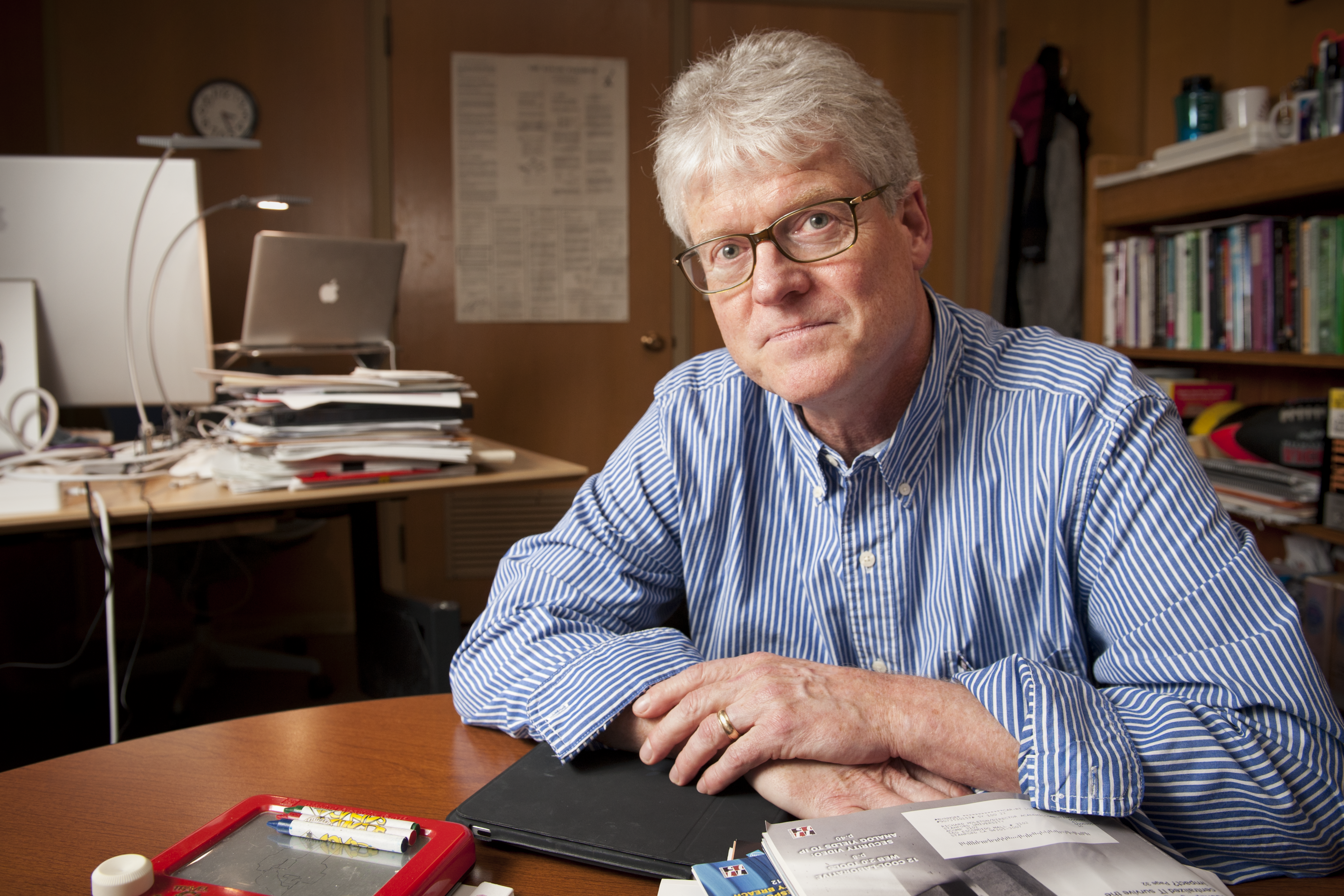
- Born: December 28, 1952 (age 73); Orange, New Jersey
- Education: Stanford University (BA English with distinction); San Francisco State University (MA English); San Francisco State University (MFA Creative Writing)
- Website: richardholeton.org

Richard Holeton (born December 28, 1952) is an American writer and higher-education administrator. His creative works are foundational in the hypertext and electronic literature genres. As a writer, his most notable work is the hypertext novel Figurski at Findhorn on Acid, which has been recognized as an important early work of electronic literature and is included in the hypertext canon.

A 20th Anniversary Edition of Figurski at Findhorn on Acid, in archival and contemporary versions, was released in 2021 by Washington State University Vancouver’s Electronic Literature Lab. Holeton's work is collected in The NEXT Museum, a digital preservation space.

Holeton's short fiction has appeared in literary journals and anthologies including ZYZZYVA, F(r)iction, Grain, OPEN: Journal of Arts & Letters, the Indiana Review, and the Mississippi Review. He also wrote the textbooks Composing Cyberspace: Identity, Community, and Knowledge in the Electronic Age and Encountering Cultures: Reading and Writing in a Changing World.

== Biography ==
=== Early life and education ===
Richard Holeton was born in Orange, New Jersey and was raised in Bellevue, Washington. He earned a BA from Stanford and MA and MFA degrees from San Francisco State University.

=== Career ===
After receiving his MA in 1986, Holeton began working as a writing lecturer at San Francisco State University, Cañada College, and Stanford University. He transitioned into working with technology and student computing. He worked to teach language and literature faculty methods of integrating computers into their classroom pedagogy and became an administrator with Stanford University Libraries and residential computing. During this time he was a Director of the New Media Consortium and also worked with EDUCAUSE to co-develop the Learning Space Rating System. Following his retirement from teaching and holding administrative positions at Stanford, Holeton is Assistant Vice Provost for Learning Environments, Emeritus.

In 2014, Holeton was awarded a fellowship from MacDowell, which he spent working in the Schelling studio. He has also received fellowships from the Brown Foundation, California Arts Council, and the National Endowment for the Arts; as well as the Transatlantic Review Award from the Henfield Foundation.

== Selected works ==
=== Books ===
- Figurski at Findhorn on Acid (Eastgate Systems, 2001). Hypertext novel (CD-ROM).
  - 20th Anniversary Edition (Electronic Literature Lab, 2021)
- Composing Cyberspace: Identity, Community, and Knowledge in the Electronic Age (McGraw-Hill, 1998). Worldcat entry.
- Encountering Cultures: Reading and Writing in a Changing World (Blair Press/Prentice Hall 2/e 1995). Worldcat entry.
- Encountering Cultures: Reading and Writing in a Changing World (Blair Press/Prentice Hall 1/e 1992). Worldcat entry.
- Lumber World: A Novel (Brautigan Library Digital Collection, 2019). Available: https://brautiganlibrary.xyz/download/holeton-lumber-world1.pdf. Podcast available (in progress): https://brautiganlibrary.xyz/dig.html#manuscripts2019.
- Lumber World: The Rejection File (Brautigan Library Digital Collection, 2019). Available: https://brautiganlibrary.xyz/download/holeton-lumber-world2.pdf.
- Step Away from the Pizza: Fictions, etc. (The Fictitious Press, 2025).

=== Short fiction and multimedia work ===
- Velcro World (2022 and 2023)
- "WAIF OD" (2020, in F(r)iction)
- "In Denial: A Further Redaction of the Mueller Report" (2019, in The Fictitious Press) Available: fictitiouspress.com
- "March Madness, 1974" (2018, in Open: Journal of Arts & Letters)
  - Republished in COG, 2018
    - Finalist, COG Page to Screen Awards
- "Custom Orthotics Changed My Life" (2010, in Kairos: A Journal of Rhetoric, Technology, and Pedagogy)
  - Also published by Kairos on YouTube
- "Calling Fruits and Vegetables" in Fish Anthology 2007: A Paper Heart is Beating, A Paper Boat Sets Sail. Fish Publishing, 2007. ISBN 9780954258665
  - Runner-up, Fish One-Page Prize
- "Product Placement" (2007, in Mississippi Review)
  - Honorable Mention, 2007 Mississippi Review Prize
- "Thanks for Covering Your Lane" (2006, in Indiana Review)
  - Finalist, 2005 Indiana Review Fiction Prize
  - Finalist, 2012 California Writers Exchange Award, Poets & Writers
- "Frequently Asked Questions About 'Hypertext'" (2006, in Electronic Literature Collection)
- "Understanding Hypertext" (2004, in ZYZZYVA)
- "Streleski at Findhorn on Acid" (1995, in Grain)
  - First Prize, Short Grain Postcard Story

=== Poetry ===
- "Afterword(s): Take a Book/Leave a Book" (2019, in Forklift, Ohio)
  - Multimedia version, Notre Dame Review, 2020
- "Sonnetizing the Singularity" (2018, in Unlost: Journal of Found Poetry & Art)

=== Nonfiction and scholarship ===
- "Someone, Somewhere, with Something: The Origins of Figurski" (2021, in Figurski at Findhorn on Acid).
- "Learning Space Rating System" (2021, in EDUCAUSE)
- "Toward Inclusive Learning Spaces: Physiological, Cognitive, and Cultural Inclusion and the Learning Space Rating System" (2020, in EDUCAUSE Review)
- "A Little Transmediation Can Be a Dangerous Thing, or What Happened When I Made a Multimedia Poem from an Artist’s Book" (2019, ELO2019: Electronic Literature Organization Conference & Media Arts Festival, Programme and Book of Abstracts)
- "How Much is Too Much New Media for the Net Generation?" (2010, in Reading and Writing New Media)
- "Signposts of the Revolution? What We Talk about When We Talk about Learning Spaces" (2009, in EDUCAUSE Review)
- "The Net Generation on Campus and Online" (2009, in Talking Stick: The Magazine of the Association of College and University Housing Officers-International)
- "New Students, Emerging Technologies, Virtual Communities, and the College Residential Experience" (2008, in Residence Life and the New Student Experience)
- "Windows and Mirrors: Interaction Design, Digital Art, and the Myth of Transparency (book review)" (2005, in Resource Center or Cyberculture Studies)
- "Constructive 'Noise in the Channel': Effects of Controversial Forwarded E-mail in a College Residential and Virtual Community" (1999, in ED-MEDIA)
- "The Semi-Virtual Composition Classroom: A Model for Techno-Amphibians" (1997, in The Technology Source (Horizon Project))
- "Amadeus (theater review)" (1987, in Palo Alto Weekly)
- "Family Life in the 80s from a Gay Perspective" (1986, in Palo Alto Weekly)
- "Stanford Waits for Godot: Celebrating Samuel Beckett at 80 (book review)" (1986, in Palo Alto Weekly)
- "An Unauthorized Peek Behind the Iron Curtain" (1985, in Palo Alto Weekly)

== Selected criticism ==
- Pisarski, Mariusz (July 14, 2021). "The new Figurski…– blueprints for media translation." Electronic Literature Lab. Available: https://dtc-wsuv.org/wp/ell/2021/07/14/the-new-figurski-blueprints-for-media-translation/
- Grigar, Dene (2021). “Migration as Translation: Moving Figurski to the Web.” Introduction. In Holeton, Richard. Figurski at Findhorn on Acid (20th Anniversary ed.). Vancouver, WA USA, Electronic Literature Lab. https://figurskiatfindhornonacid.com/introduction.html
- Tratner, Michael (2021). “The Distinctive Quality of Holeton’s Hypertext Novel.” Introduction. In Holeton, Richard. Figurski at Findhorn on Acid (20th Anniversary ed.). Vancouver, WA USA, Electronic Literature Lab. https://figurskiatfindhornonacid.com/introduction.html
- Grigar, Dene (December 20, 2019). "A Man and His Shoes: Complexity and Satire in Richard Holeton's Figurski at Findhorn on Acid". Rebooting Electronic Literature, Vol. 2: Documenting pre-web born digital media. Nouspace Publications. Available: https://scalar.usc.edu/works/rebooting-electronic-literature-volume-2/essay-on-richard-holetons-figurski-at-findhorn-on-acid?path=richard-holetons-figurski-at-findhorn-on-acid
- Miya, Chelsea (May 12, 2019). “Figurski at Findhorn on Acid”. Electronic Literature Directory. Available: https://directory.eliterature.org/individual-work/5061
- Heckman, Davin; O'Sullivan, James (2018). "Electronic Literature: Contexts and Poetics". Literary Studies in the Digital Age. MLA Commons. Available: dlsanthology.mla.hcommons.org/electronic-literature-contexts-and-poetics/
- Bau de Oliveira, Joanita (September 23, 2016). "A Narrativa Especular em Hipertexto: O Caso de 'Frequently Asked Questions About “Hypertext”,' De Richard Holeton". XV Abralic. Available: https://abralic.org.br/anais/arquivos/2016_1491505737.pdf
  - English translation: https://files.journoportfolio.com/users/43131/uploads/7c782142-5a28-46dc-9a54-bd8add95cbb7.pdf
- Ensslin, Astrid (2014). ""The Pen is Your Weapon of Choice": Ludic hypertext literature and the play with the reader". Literary Gaming. MIT Press. ISBN 978-0262027151.
- Bell, Alice (2010). "The Colorful Worlds of Richard Holeton's (2001) 'Figurski at Findhorn on Acid'". The Possible Worlds of Hypertext Fiction. Palgrave Macmillan. pp. 150–184. ISBN 978-0-230-28128-8.

== See also ==
- Electronic literature
- Hypertext fiction
- Eastgate Systems
