= George Landow (professor) =

Professor of English and Art History Emeritus at Brown University

George Paul Landow (25 August 1940 – 31 May 2023) was Professor of English and Art History Emeritus at Brown University. He was a leading authority on Victorian literature, art, and culture, as well as a pioneer in criticism and theory of Electronic literature, hypertext and hypermedia. He also pioneered the use of hypertext and the web in higher education.

== Work ==
George Landow published extensively on John Ruskin and the Pre-Raphaelite Brotherhood, specifically the life and works of William Holman Hunt.

Landow was also a leading theorist of hypertext, of the effects of digital technology on language, and of electronic media on literature. While his early work on hypertext sought to establish design rules for efficient hypertext communication, he is especially noted for his book Hypertext: The Convergence of Contemporary Literary Theory and Technology, first published in 1992, which is considered a "landmark" in the academic study of electronic writing systems, and states the view that the interpretive agenda of post-structuralist literary theory anticipated the essential characteristics of hypertext.

In Hypertext Landow draws on theorists such as Jacques Derrida, Roland Barthes, Gilles Deleuze, Paul de Man, and Michel Foucault, among others, and argues, especially, that hypertext embodies the textual openness championed by post-structuralist theory and that hypertext enables people to develop knowledge in a non-linear, non-sequential, associative way that linear texts do not. Though he was a consistent proponent of visual overviews and navigational maps, he long argued that hypertext navigation is not a problem—that hypertexts are not more difficult to understand than linear texts.

Landow also pioneered the use of the web in higher education with projects such as The Victorian Web, The Contemporary, Postcolonial, & Postimperial Literature in English web, and The Cyberspace, Hypertext, & Critical Theory web. J. Yellowlees Douglas recognizes Landow's early hypertext works like the Dickens Web and Landow and John Lanestedt's The "In Memoriam" in The End of Books or Books without End?

== Select works ==
- Hypertext 3.0 : Critical Theory and New Media in an Era of Globalization. Baltimore: Johns Hopkins University Press, 2006. ISBN 0801882567
- Hypertext 2.0. Baltimore: Johns Hopkins University Press, 1997. ISBN 0801855853
- Hypertext : The Convergence of Contemporary Critical Theory and Technology. Baltimore: Johns Hopkins University Press, 1992. ISBN 0801842808
- Hyper/Text/Theory, 1994
- Hypermedia and Literary Studies, 1994 (with Paul Delany)
- The Digital Word: Text-Based Computing in the Humanities, 1993 (with Paul Delany)
- Elegant Jeremiahs: The Sage from Carlyle to Mailer, 1986
- A Pre-Raphaelite Friendship: The Correspondence of William Holman Hunt and John Lucas Tupper, 1986
- Ladies of Shalott: A Victorian Masterpiece and Its Contexts, 1985
- Images of Crisis: Literary Iconology, 1750 to the Present, 1982
- Victorian Types, Victorian Shadows; Biblical Typology in Victorian Literature, Art, and Thought, 1980
- Approaches to Victorian Autobiography, 1979
- William Holman Hunt and Typological Symbolism, 1979
- The Aesthetic and Critical Theories of John Ruskin, 1972

== Honors ==
- Fulbright in Information Technology, Croatia, June 2011.
- Distinguished visiting professor, National University of Singapore, August 1998 - March 1999.
- National Endowment for the Humanities Summer Institute for College Teachers at Illinois State University (project director: Roger Tarr), 1998.
- Visiting professor, University of Zimbabwe, August 1997.
- ACC Distinguished Lecturer in Computer Science, University of South Alabama, 1997.
- Visiting research fellow in electronics and computer science, University of Southampton, 1995.
- British Academy Visiting professor, Bowland College, University of Lancaster, 1994.
- Mellon Foundation Fresh Combinations Grant for a course in hypertext and literary theory, 1991–1992
- National Endowment for the Humanities Summer Institute for College Teachers at Yale University (project director: Duncan Robinson), 1991.
- EDUCOM/ENCRIPTAL Higher Education Software Award, Best Curriculum Innovation - Humanities, from National Center for Research to Improve Postsecondary Teaching and Learning, 1990.
- Faculty Fellow, Institute for Research in Information and Scholarship, 1989–1994
- National Endowment for the Humanities Summer Institute for College Teachers at Yale University (project director: Duncan Robinson), 1988.
- Annenberg/Corporation for Public Broadcasting Planning Grant, for The Continents of Knowledge, 1988.
- Annenberg/Corporation for Public Broadcasting Grant to develop educational software and course materials for the humanities, 1985–1987.
- National Endowment for the Arts Grant for Ladies of Shalott, 1984–1985. (project director)
- National Endowment for the Humanities Summer Stipend, 1984.
- Guggenheim Fellow, 1978
- Visiting fellow, Brasenose College, Oxford, 1977
- National Endowment for the Humanities Project Development Grant, 1976.
- Phi Beta Kappa, 1974
- Guggenheim Fellow, 1973
- Gustave O. Arldt Award, Council of Graduate Schools in the United States, for a book in the humanities (for The Aesthetic and Critical Theories of John Ruskin), 1972
- Master of Arts degree, Ad Eundum, Brown University, 1972
- Visiting associate professor, University of Chicago, 1970–1971
- Chamberlain Fellow, Columbia University, Summer 1969
- Fellow of the Society for the Humanities, Cornell University, 1968–1969
- Research Grant, Council on the Humanities, Columbia University, Summer 1968
- Fulbright Scholar, Birkbeck College, University of London, 1964–1965
- Class of 1873 Fellow in English Letters, Princeton University, 1962–1964
- Woodrow Wilson Fellow, Brandeis University, 1961-1962

== See also ==
- Espen Aarseth
- Jay David Bolter
- Robert Coover
- J. Yellowlees Douglas
- Electronic Literature Organization
- N. Katherine Hayles
- Shelley Jackson
- Michael Joyce
- Lev Manovich
- Stuart Moulthrop
