= Figurski at Findhorn on Acid =

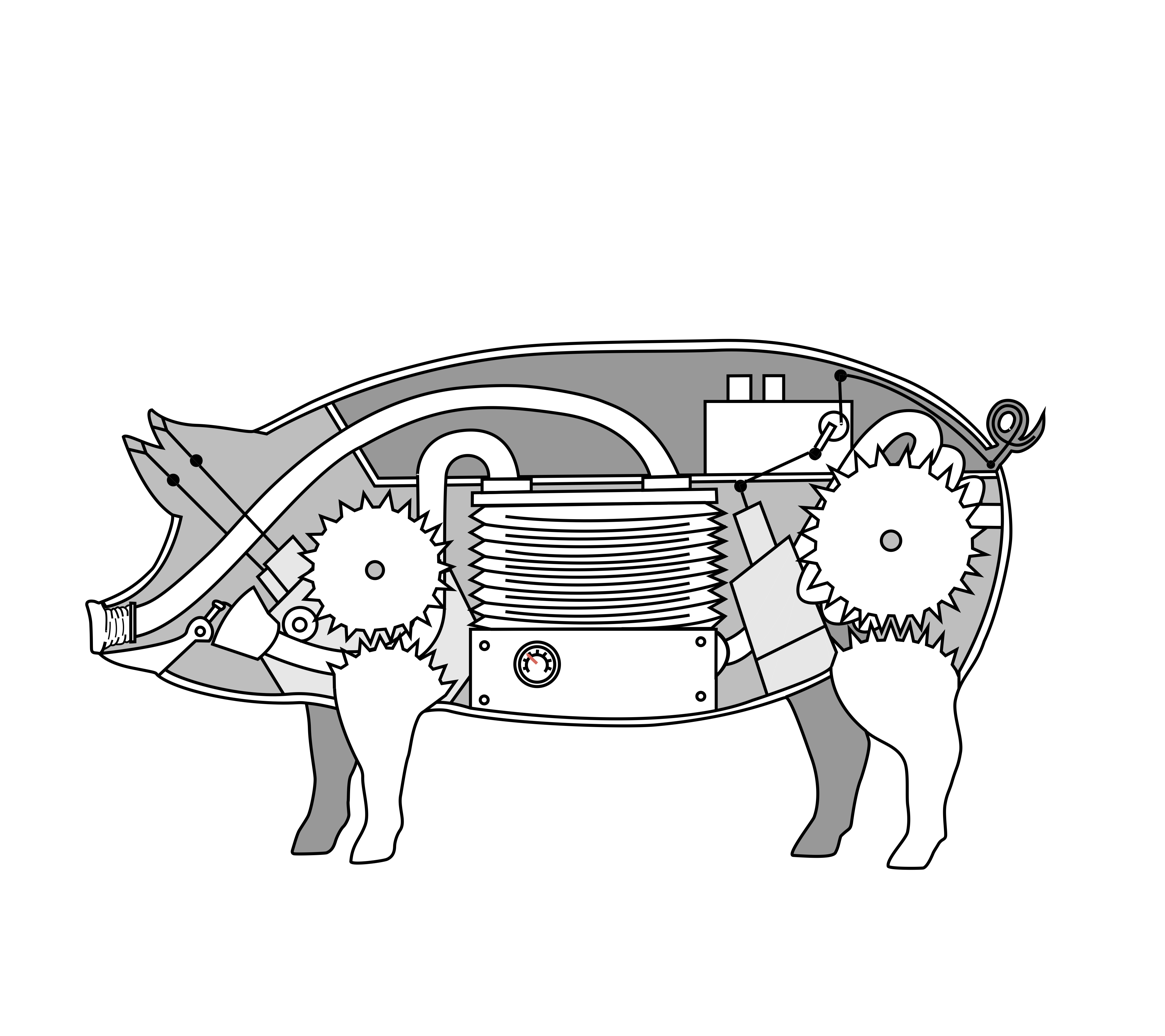
Rosellini's 1737 Mechanical Pig is a fictional automaton from the hypertext novel "Figurski at Findhorn on Acid" by Richard Holeton

Figurski at Findhorn on Acid is a hypertext novel by Richard Holeton published on CD-ROM by Eastgate Systems in 2001 and republished on the open web by the Electronic Literature Lab, Washington State University, in 2021. Re-Imagined Radio presented a radio interpretation of this novel in 2022 in which Holeton made an appearance. It is a work of interactive fiction with various paths for readers to choose from, an early example of electronic literature, and one of 23 works included in the literary hypertext canon.

== Origins and influences ==
Figurski at Findhorn on Acid developed from a flash fiction published in Grain literary magazine in 1996 entitled “Streleski at Findhorn on Acid,” winner of Grain’s "postcard story" contest. Holeton extended the concept of "Someone, at Someplace, with Something" with two more characters, two more locations, and two more artifacts, to create an electronic text using Storyspace software, which became a novel-length MFA thesis at San Francisco State University.

Holeton drew inspiration for the novel from writers such as Laurence Sterne and Vladimir Nabokov, whom he admires for their humor and self-reflexivity and considers precursors of hypertext fiction for their digressive and non-linear work.

== Publication history ==
The first full version of Figurski at Findhorn on Acid was published on CD-ROM by Eastgate Systems, Inc. in 2001. A 2nd Edition was self-published by Holeton on Storyspace 3.0 in 2008.

A 20th Anniversary Edition was published on the web using HTML5, CSS, and JavaScript in 2021 by Washington State University Vancouver's Electronic Literature Lab. This edition includes both contemporary and archival versions, as well as three new introductions, written by Holeton and scholars Dene Grigar and Michael Tratner. The process of this emulation is explained in The NEXT Museum, Library, and Preservation Space's work, The Challenges of Born-Digital Fiction.

== Plot ==
Figurski at Findhorn on Acid contains an overall plot as well as the multiplicity of storylines that characterizes hypertext fiction. The three protagonists are title character Frank Figurski, a Vietnamese-American, "No-Hands Cup Flipper” named Nguyen Van Tho, and a gender-bending French-Moroccan journalist, Fatima Michelle Vieuchanger.

The characters compete to possess a remarkable 18th-century automaton, Rosellini's 1737 Mechanical Pig, and a forgery of the automaton. They travel from Findhorn, Scotland to a South Florida trailer park with side-trips to the virtual Holodeck in their pursuit. Individually and together, they discover, hide, steal, and disassemble the mechanical pig. In the end, they meet up at the turn of the 21st century.

== Structure ==
The novel has a combinatorial structure, its scenes determined by every possible combination of the three main characters, three artifacts, and three locations. Readers can choose to navigate the resulting 147 unique scenarios in various ways. A “default reading path” follows a roughly chronological path through the passages. Readers can also navigate the text using two directory pages, the “Navigator” page and the “Time Lines” page.

The "Navigator" screen contains links to the characters, places, and artifacts within the novel.

The "Time Lines" page links to time sequences and events chronologically, covering dates from prehistoric to the distant future, with most events occurring from 1993 to 2000. Readers can choose to follow any of the 12 provided time sequences.

The "Map" function, originally a feature of Storyspace, enables the reader to navigate the text by clicking through a graphical representation of the structure, where text passages are represented by nested rectangles and links are shown with arrows. This functionality has been recreated for the web in the 2021 edition.

The novel also contains a “Notes” section, which is divided into nine thematic categories that include an additional 147 passages of metacommentary on elements of the main text, many with images. Within the scenarios of the novel, notes can be accessed via hidden links. In the original Storyspace version, those links become visible with a keystroke combination, as wire-frame boxes around selected text. In the modern web version, in addition to the keystroke combination, a "link" button on each page reveals the wire-framed text links.

With its 147 main narrative passages, 147 Notes, and 60 navigational pages, the novel totals 354 passages, interconnected by 2001 links.

This work was reinstated by The NEXT Museum as described in Putting the Pig Back Together Again: Dis(re)connection in "Figurski at Findhorn on Acid.

== Genre ==
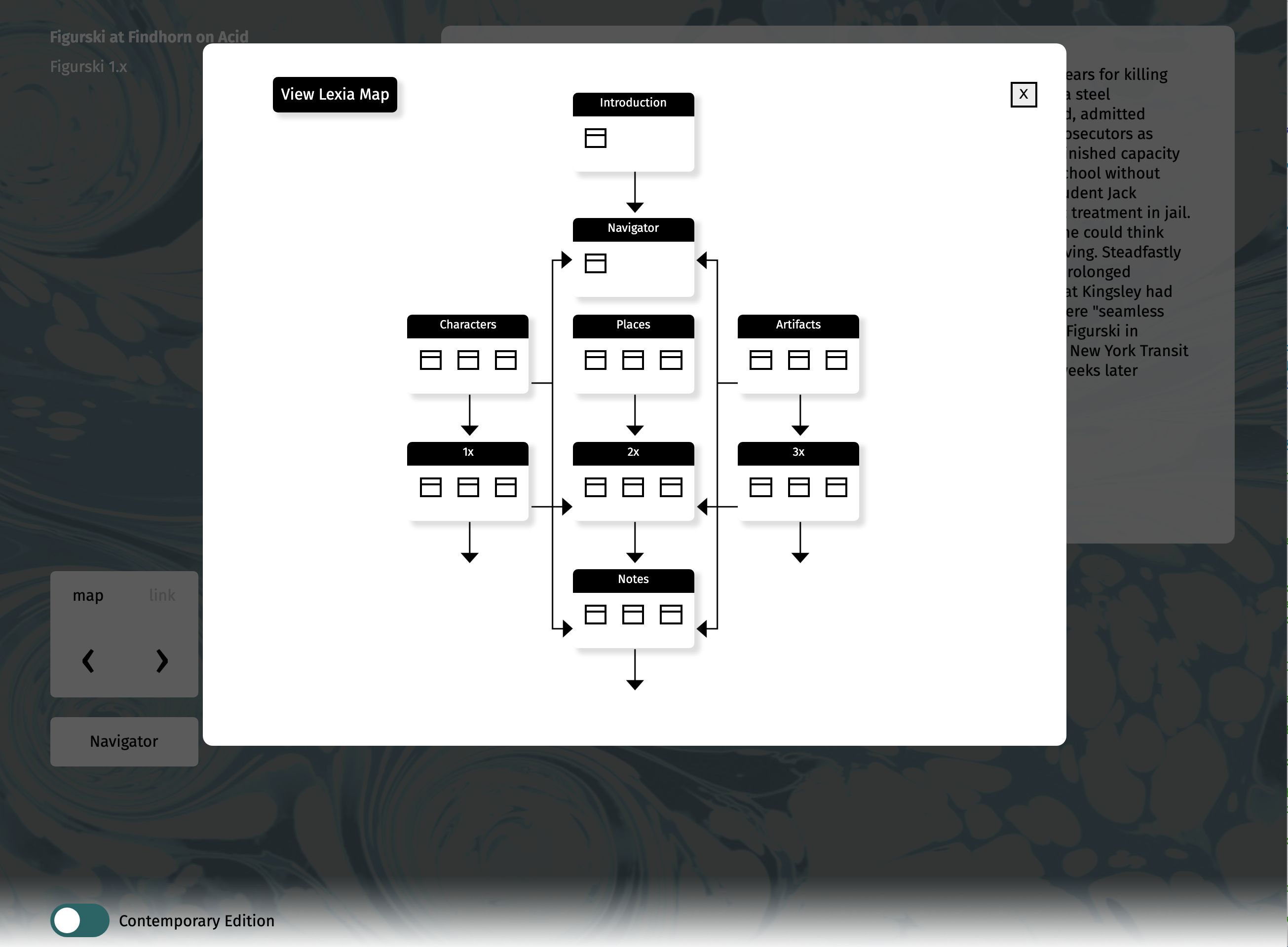
Global map view of hypertext novel "Figurski at Findhorn on Acid”

The novel employs or parodies multiple genres, including dramatic dialogue, scientific writing, journalism, dialectically transcribed language (e.g. Scottish youth slang), heroic couplets, haikus, and email. Academic language, research culture, and pedagogical rhetoric are especially satirized.

== Literary significance and critical reception ==
Figurski at Findhorn on Acid has been studied and discussed by a number of literary scholars and hypertext critics, including Dene Grigar, Michael Tratner, Mariusz Pisarski, Astrid Ensslin, Alice Bell, and Chelsea Miya. It is catalogued and glossed in the Electronic Literature Directory and the ELMCIP Electronic Literature Knowledge Base, and it is part of the permanent repository of the Electronic Literature Organization. Critical readings of the novel discuss its episodic and combinatorial structure, layers of self-reflexivity, and comedy and social satire.

In selecting Figurski at Findhorn on Acid for the "hypertext canon," Ensslin writes,"Holeton ranks among the few writers who have taken the original concept of hyperfiction in the sense of graphemic centrality into the new millennium." Alice Bell analyzes the text in a framework of Marie-Laure Ryan's Possible Worlds Theory, arguing that much of the novel's absurdity results from incongruities among its layers of fictionalized and "real-world" events and locations, juxtaposing mundane episodes with bizarre situations. In a narratological analysis, Bell and Ensslin discuss how the novel involves the reader in its construction through second-person narration, and other uses of the textual "you." Bell notes that this work has received less critical attention than other hypertext works and speculates that this is because it was written in 2001, when other forms of electronic literature were emerging.

Critics have also discussed the novel as postmodern literature for its use of metacommentary, its blurring of boundaries between fiction and reality, and its investigation of what Jean Baudrillard called the "omnipotence of manipulation." Michael Tratner suggests that the novel is "not merely about endless copies," but also "about the search for a center . . . .an alternative to the chaos which Baudrillard condemns and [Jacques] Derrida in a sense welcomes."
