= Deena Larsen =

American writer of electronic literature (born 1964)

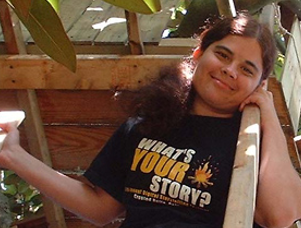
- Larsen in 1999
- Born: 1964 (age 61–62); Denver, Colorado, U.S.
- Education: University of Northern Colorado (BA); University of Colorado (MA)
- Occupation: Author
- Writing career
- Years active: 1993–present
- Genre: Electronic literature
- Website: www.deenalarsen.net

Deena Larsen (born 1964) is an American new media and hypertext fiction author involved in the creative electronic writing community since the 1980s. Her work has been published in online journals such as the Iowa Review Web, Cauldron and Net, frAme, inFLECT, and Blue Moon Review. Since May 2007, the Deena Larsen Collection of early electronic literature has been housed at the Maryland Institute for Technology in the Humanities.

== Education ==
In 1986, Larsen received her BA in English and Logic from the University of Northern Colorado. Her undergraduate thesis, Nansense Ya Snorsted: A logical look at nonsense, received the university's 1986 Best Thesis Award. In 1991, after spending time in San Francisco and Japan, she returned to Colorado and earned her MA in English from the University of Colorado where she wrote one of the first MA theses on hypertext, titled Hypertext and Hyperpossibilities.

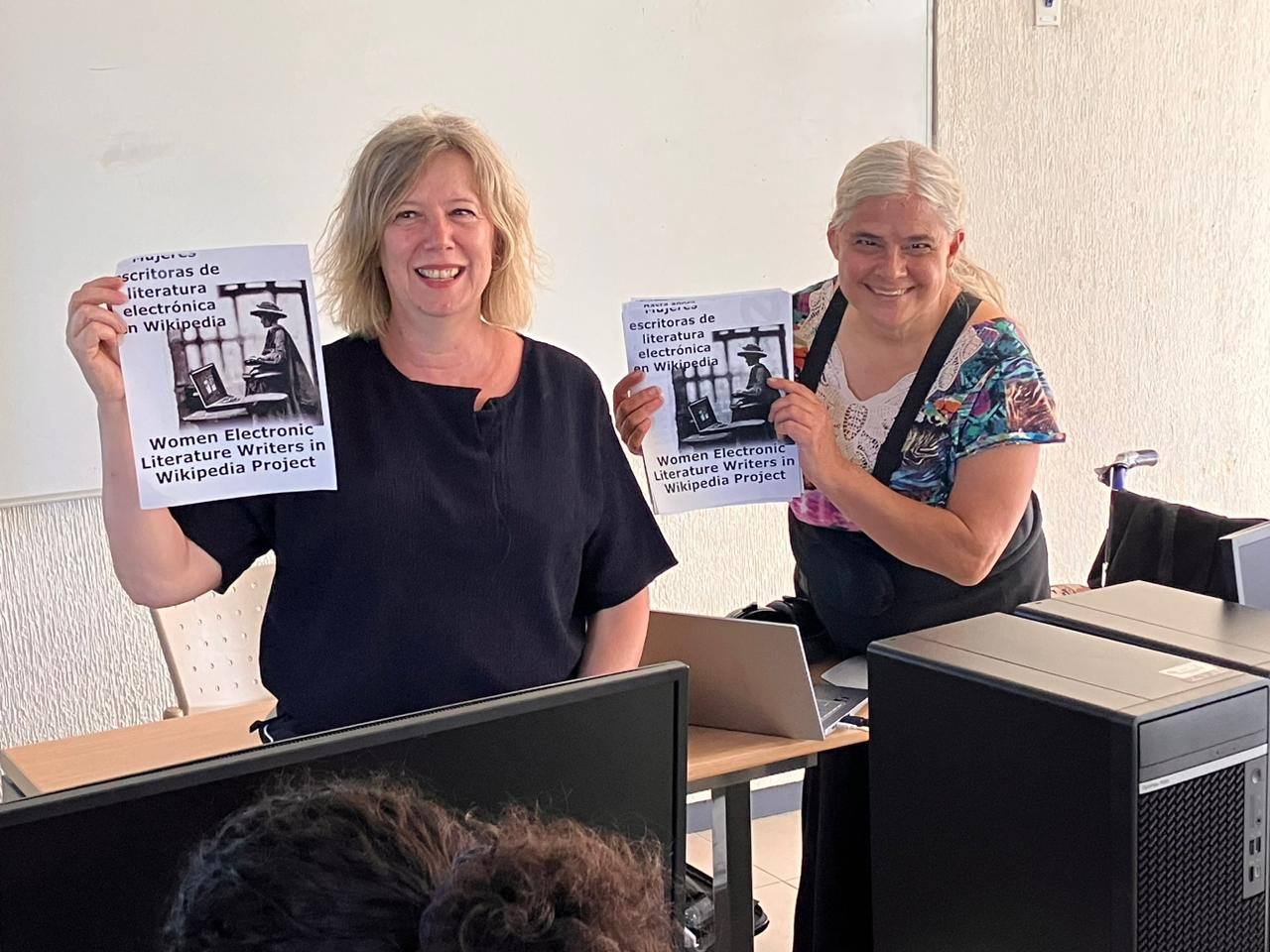
María Mencía and Deena Larsen teaching at the National Autonomous University in Mexico City in 2022

== Career and influence ==
Larsen has been noted by the Electronic Literature Organization as "a pioneering influence in the electronic literature field." She is described as a "new media visionary who has been active in the creative electronic writing community since its inception in the 1980s" by the Maryland Institute of Technology in the Humanities, which hosts a collection of her papers and software. Larsen's experimentation with literary possibilities in new digital media has led to her work being frequently analysed and cited by scholars and critics, with works like "Carving in Possibilities" (2001) being called "canonical".

Larsen has led numerous writers workshops—either online, at conferences, or universities— on the subject of hypertext, and has played a vital role in organising the electronic literature community. She hosted Hypertext Writers' Workshops at ACM Hypertext conferences in the 1990s and hosted the Electronic Literature Organization online chats on electronic literature from 2000 to 2005. In 2012, Larsen wrote a free textbook called Fun da mentals which serves as an introduction to the field of electronic literature. She currently works as a technical writer at the Bureau of Reclamation, where she was an investigator for research granted by the Science and Technology Program in the 2015 fiscal year.

Deena Larsen has Multiple Hereditary Exostoses, and wrote a work, Embodying my Mother's Bones about her disability.

As of 2022, Larsen serves on the Literary Advisory Board for the Electronic Literature Organization. From 2023-24, she was artist-in-residence at the Electronic Literature Lab at Washington State University at Vancouver. She has also been a board member for trAce and is a past member of the board of directors for the ELO.

== Works ==
Deena Larsen's first work, Marble Springs (1993), Eastgate Systems, was one of the first interactive hypertext poetry collections. The work explores the lives of women in a Colorado mountain town in the 19th century. Larsen's admiration for Edgar Lee Master's Spoon River Anthology inspired her to create her own world that followed connections similar to those experienced by readers of Master's book experienced. Written in Hypercard, Marble Springs includes a collection of poems for the reader to explore and discover the identity of the author behind each poem. Writing in Poetics Today, narratologist Marie-Laure Ryan describes Marble Springs as a "narrative of place", which is not constructed around an overarching plot or "grand narrative", but "in the 'little stories' that the user discovers in all the nooks and crannies of the fictional world." This means that closure is built in, enabling "readers to pause in their reading or leave it completely".

Her second work, Samplers, Eastgate Systems (1997), is a series of short stories done in Storyspace and used the design of a quilt pattern to tell various stories. Samplers explores allows the reader to explore different narratives and stories through hypertext. Eastgate Systems Inc. noted Larsen's work as "Finely written and intricately structured, Samplers breaks new ground for short hypertext fiction."

Regarding Larsen's work, scholar Jessica Laccetti observed that, "In Larsen's case, as in Caitlin Fisher's These Waves of Girls, a default path is built into the narrative, suggesting both chronological sequence and plot development. While 'scholars and analysts' can travel more flexible paths through the stories, first time-readers are advised to follow thematic or character links."

=== Selected works ===
This is a list of selected works by Larsen, a more comprehensive list can be seen on ELMCIP: Electronic Literature Knowledge Base.
Work title	Publisher	Publication type	Brief description	Year	Ref.
Andromeda and Eliza	N/A	Installation	Work of interactive fiction that uses Twine hypertext to encourage readers to consider choice and agency. This work's purpose is to allow the reader to "re-imagine the woman's journey from victim to co-author of her own fate."	2017	
Playing with Rose: Exploring a New Conceptual Language	N/A	Exhibited at the ELO conference in 2016	The Rose Language is a work of hypertext that re-imagines the basic English language by giving each letter of a word a symbol that explains the context of which the word is used in. (See external links to visit the site.)	Presented in 2016	
Modern Moral Fairy Tales	N/A	Exhibited at the ELO conference 2012	Dedicated to Larsen's partner, MaJe, this work includes two main storylines. One including a fairy tale story and the other set in an internet cafe dealing with a suppression of information from the state.	Presented in 2012	
Firefly	Poems That Go	Published online in an online journal	This work of hypertext allows readers to click each stanza to reveal a different aspect of the story. President of the Electronic Literature Organization, Leonardo Flores, describes Larsen's Firefly as "a speaker going out into nature and having an aesthetic and philosophical experience."	2002	
Samplers: Nine Vicious Little Hypertexts	Eastgate Systems, inc.	Published originally on disc, CD, or DVD	Presented in the form of a quilt, this work of hypertext explores narratives and point of view's from various characters in the nine different storylines.	1997	
Marble Springs 1.0	Eastgate Systems, inc.	Published originally on disc, CD, or DVD	Written in Hypercard, this work of hypertext explores the lives of women in the 19th century through poems meant for the reader to explore in an abandoned church in a ghost town.	1993	

== Awards ==
- 2023: Maverick Award by Electronic Literature Organization
