= Afternoon, a story =

1987 hypertext fiction by Michael Joyce

Cover art for floppy disk case for afternoon

afternoon, a story, spelled with a lowercase 'a', is a work of electronic literature written in 1987 by American author Michael Joyce. It was published by Eastgate Systems in 1990 and is known as one of the first works of hypertext fiction.

afternoon was first offered to the public as a demonstration of the hypertext authoring system Storyspace, announced in 1987 at the first Association for Computing Machinery Hypertext conference in a paper by Michael Joyce and Jay David Bolter. In 1990, it was published on diskette and distributed in the same form by Eastgate Systems. It was followed by a series of other Storyspace hypertext fictions, including Stuart Moulthrop's Victory Garden, Shelley Jackson's Patchwork Girl and Deena Larsen's Marble Springs. Eastgate continued to publish the work in the 2010s and distributed it on a USB flash drive.

== Plot and structure ==
The hypertext fiction tells the story of Peter, a recently divorced man who witnessed a car crash. Hours later, he suspects that the wrecked car may have involved his ex-wife and their son.

The plot may change each time it is read if the reader chooses different paths.

== Critical reception ==
Robert Coover reviewed this work in August 29, 1993 in the New York Times Book Review, "Hyperfiction; And Now, Boot Up the Reviews"

This is a highly discussed work of electronic literature since it was one of the first electronic interactive novels, therefore many articles have been written about it. Espen J. Aarseth devotes a chapter of his book Cybertext to afternoon, arguing that it is a classic example of modernist literature. It is however often thought of as a work of postmodern literature, as evidenced by its inclusion in the Norton Anthology of Postmodern American Fiction.

Chapters of Jay David Bolter's Writing Space and J. Yellowlees Douglas's The End of Books or Books Without End also discuss afternoon, as does Matthew G. Kirschenbaum's Mechanisms: New Media and the Forensic Imagination.

A number of scholars have discussed the extent to which afternoon extends or breaks with conventional definitions of narrative.

Early scholarship used and adapted the theory of narratology to understand afternoon. One of the first examples is Gunnar Liestøl's article "Wittgenstein, Genette, and the Reader's Narrative in Hypertext" in George Landow's Hyper/Text/Theory (1994). Jill Walker's 1998 analysis explores "ways in which the text confuses the reader but also the many stabilising elements that aid the reader to piece together a story". Rasmus Blok discusses "the sense of narrative" in afternoon.

== Translations and editions ==
afternoon has been published in many different editions since it was first distributed on a floppy disk with a handwritten label in 1987. Dene Grigar has compiled an overview, with details about each edition.

The hypertext fiction has been translated into Italian, German, Polish and French.
