= Storyspace =

Software for writing and reading hypertext

- Original authors: Jay David Bolter; John B. Smith (UNC Computer Science professor); Michael Joyce
- Developers: Eastgate Systems, Mark Bernstein
- Release: October 1987; 39 years ago
- Stable release: 3.2.0 for MacOS
- Operating system: Cross-platform
- License: proprietary
- Website: www.eastgate.com/storyspace/

Storyspace is a software program for creating, editing, and reading hypertext fiction. It can also be used for writing and organizing fiction and non-fiction intended for print. Maintained and distributed by Eastgate Systems, the software is available both for Windows and Mac.

== History ==
Storyspace was the first software program specifically developed for creating, editing, and reading hypertext fiction. It was created in the 1980s by Jay David Bolter, UNC Computer Science Professor John B. Smith, and Michael Joyce. Bolter and Joyce presented it to the first international meeting on Hypertext at Chapel Hill in October 1987. After a failed attempt to license the software to Broderbund, they licensed it to Eastgate Systems in December 1990. Mark Bernstein, chief scientist at Eastgate, has maintained and developed the Storyspace program ever since.

== Artistic and educational use ==
Several classics of hypertext literature were created using Storyspace, such as afternoon, a story by Michael Joyce, Victory Garden by Stuart Moulthrop, Patchwork Girl by Shelley Jackson, and Figurski at Findhorn on Acid by Richard Holeton.

Storyspace has also been used extensively in secondary and tertiary education for teaching writing skills and critical thinking. It has been used for teaching creative writing in particular, and was especially popular in the early years of the web, when hypertext linking was less fluid and web pages had to be hand-coded in HTML. Proponents argue that Storyspace's visual maps of how hypertext nodes are connected allow students to focus on writing in hypertext rather than on technical issues, and that linking and/or visually juxtaposing ideas allows students to develop a visual logic.

== See also ==
- Hypermedia
