= The NEXT Museum =

Online museum for net art and literature

"The NEXT"
- Location: Washington State University Vancouver
- Established: 2011
- Website: Official website

The NEXT: Museum, Library, and Preservation Space is a repository of electronic literature. It is supported by Washington State University at Vancouver and the Electronic Literature Organization. This is a digital museum dedicated to reviving and maintaining these works to make them accessible to all. Physical artifacts are held at the Electronic Literature Lab in Vancouver, Washington, US.

== History ==
This digital museum originally housed 30 separate collections of 2,500 electronic literature works which had increased to over 3,000 works by 2022. The NEXT uses an Extended Electronic Metadata Schema (ELMS) to describe the complex and interactive digital works it holds. This metadata describes the work and alerts readers to potential reading issues such as fleeting text, color use, or requirements for moving a mouse or moving with a virtual reality environment. The lab opened officially in 2011.

== Reviving works ==
Electronic literature pieces have used software available at the time that are since obsolete, such as HyperCard, Eastgate Systems' StorySpace, Director, ToolBox, and Flash. Recreating works

The NEXT has re-created these works by migrating them to newer systems. The NEXT Museum has re-imagined many individual works, including:

- Charles Bernstein, An Mosaic for Convergence (1997 original publication, 2019 re-imagined)
- Richard Holeton, Figurski at Findhorn on Acid
- Caitlin Fisher, These Waves of Girls
- John McDaid, Uncle Buddy's Phantom Funhouse in 2021
- Stuart Moulthrop, Victory Garden in 2022
- David Kolb, Socrates in the Labyrinth and Caged Texts in 2022
- Bill Bly, We Descend in 2023

=== Noting metadata ===
Where recreating the work is not yet possible, such as Shockwave works like Jim Andrew's Nio, and Noah Wardrip Fruin et al.'s The Impermanence Agent, the NEXT has provided as much metadata as possible.

== Individual author collections ==
The NEXT Museum also focuses on collections for notable authors in the electronic literature field, which include their own digital works and other donated physical or digital materials. For example, the Marjorie C. Luesebrink Collection holds 66 works. Luesebrink created and published 27 of these works under the pen name M.D. Coverley—and the NEXT Museum re-imagined, migrated, and developed video playthroughs of these works as they were written on now-obsolete software. The other works in this collection were donated by Luesebrink and include her personal copies of other author's works.

Author collections include:

- José Aburto
- Jo-Anne Green
- N. Katherine Hayles
- Richard Holeton
- Michael Joyce
- Robert Kendall
- David Kolb
- Deena Larsen
- Marjorie Luesebrink. The Marjorie C. Luesebrink Collection at ELO’s The NEXT features 66 works created and collected by this pioneering digital literary artist who publishes under the name M. D. Coverley.
- Cathy Marshall
- Talan Memmott
- Stuart Moulthrop
- Jason Nelson
- Alan Sondheim
- Hazel Smith
- Sarah Smith
- Stephanie Strickland
- Rob Swigart
- Helen Thorington
- Rob Wittig (NetProv)
- Jody Zellen

== Online journal and publication collections ==
Online journals were founded by communities and individuals. The NEXT Museum has curated and collected works from these journals, including the Iowa Review Web (1999-2008) BeeHive (1998 -2004), Cauldron and Net (1997-2002 founded by Claire Dinsmore), Poems That Go (2000-2004), Turbulence.org (1996-2016 co-founded by Jo-Anne Green), and The New River (1996–present). These collections have a wider range than electronic literature, as the Turbulence collected online Portugeuese Netart from 1997-2004.

== Academic publications ==
Stuart Moulthrop and Dene Grigar co-authored two works to document The NEXT's Pathfinder project, which provided video and audio recordings of currently inaccessible works using historically appropriate platforms, termed "traversals": Pathfinders: Documenting the Experience of Early Digital Literature (June 2015) and Traversals: The Use of Preservation for Early Electronic Writing (April 2017).

Cambridge University Press, Digital Literary Studies, has released Dene Grigar and Mariusz Pisarski's work: The Challenges of Born-Digital Fiction (March 2024), as a print work and as a multi-media online work.

== Exhibitions ==
The NEXT Museum curates exhibitions, such as Vision Unbound for Women's History month (2024), Hypertext an art in Italy September 5–8, 2023 in conjunction with the ACM Hypertext Conference, and AfterFlash.

== See also ==
- Electronic literature
- Lists of archives
