= Shelley Jackson =

American writer and artist (born 1963)

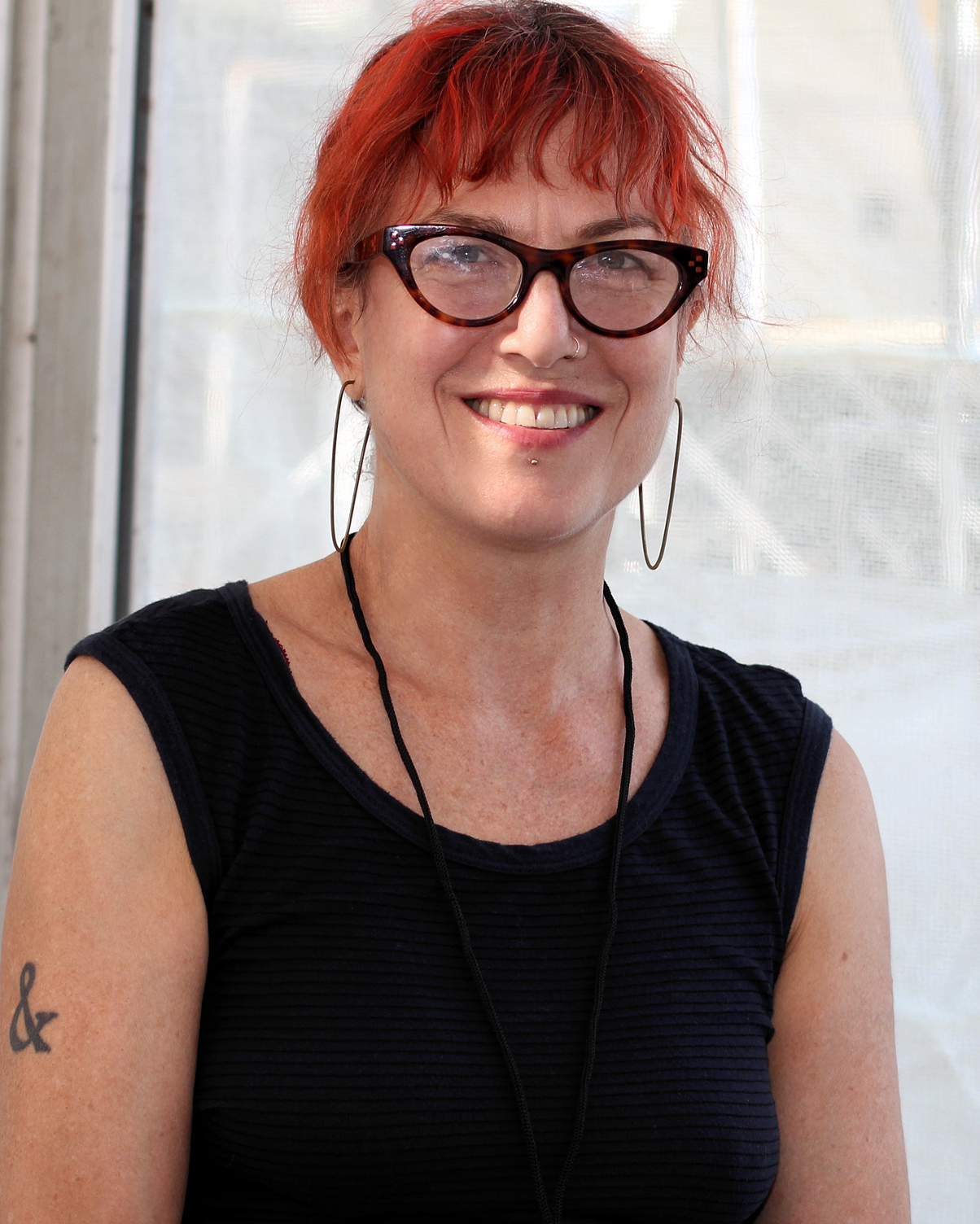
- Jackson at the 2018 Texas Book Festival
- Born: 1963 (age 62–63)
- Education: Berkeley High School; Stanford University (BA); Brown University (MFA)
- Occupations: Writer, artist
- Spouse: Jonathan Lethem (m. 1987; div. 1998)
- Website: www.ineradicablestain.com

Shelley Jackson (born 1963) is an American writer and artist known for her cross-genre experimental works. These include her hyperfiction Patchwork Girl (1995), her first novel, Half Life (2006) and her story written in the snow, Snow (2014-).

== Biography ==
In her own words: "Shelley Jackson was extracted from the bum leg of a water buffalo in 1963 in the Philippines and grew up complaining in Berkeley, California." Here, her family ran a small women's bookstore for several years; Jackson later recalled, "I was already in love with books by then [...] and the family store just confirmed what I already suspected, that books were the most interesting and important things in the world. Of course I wanted to write them!" She graduated from Berkeley High School, and received a B.A. in art from Stanford University and an M.F.A. in creative writing from Brown University. She is self-described as a "student in the art of digression".

While at Brown, Jackson was taught by electronic literature advocates Robert Coover and George Landow. During one of Landow's lectures in 1993, Jackson began drawing "a naked woman with dotted-line scars" in her notebook, an image she eventually expanded into her first hypertext novel, Patchwork Girl. Jackson later said that she never considered publishing Patchwork Girl as a print novel, explaining,

I guess you could say I want my fiction to be more like a world full of things that you can wander around in, rather than a record or memory of those wanderings. The quilt and graveyard sections [of the hypertext], where a concrete metaphor that resonates with the themes of the work creates a literary structure, satisfy me in a very corporeal way. I salivate, my fingers itch.

A nonchronological reworking of Mary Shelley's Frankenstein, Patchwork Girl was published by Eastgate Systems in 1995 to acclaim; it became Eastgate's best-selling CD-ROM title and is now considered a groundbreaking work of hypertext fiction. "Patchwork Girl" uses tissue and scars as well as the body and the skeleton as metaphors for the juxtaposition of lexia and link. While working in a San Francisco, California bookstore, Jackson published two more hypertexts, the autobiographical My Body (1997), and The Doll Games (2001), which she wrote with her sister Pamela.

In the late nineties, Jackson alternated hypertext work with writing short stories (in publications such as The Paris Review and Conjunctions) and children's books. Jackson has explained that she "completely ignored" one college professor who told her the key to success was focus, and added that "[s]ometimes this means shuttling manically between art and writing and other, more unmentionable obsessions. More and more, though, and partly because of the ease of mixing media in electronic work, I've come to see all these projects as interrelated." During this period, Jackson also did cover and interior illustrations for two short story collections by Kelly Link, Stranger Things Happen (2001) and Magic for Beginners (2005). She also illustrated her own children's books, The Old Woman and the Wave (1998) and Sophia, the Alchemist's Dog (2002).

Skin Project "Word"

She published her first short story collection, The Melancholy of Anatomy, in 2002. In 2003 she launched the Skin Project, which she described as a "mortal work of art": a novella published exclusively in the form of tattoos on the skin of volunteers, one word at a time. Only those participating in the project were permitted to read the entire narrative. Jackson's first novel, Half Life, was published by HarperCollins in 2006. The story of a disenchanted conjoined twin named Nora Olney who plots to have her other twin murdered, Half Life suggests an alternate history in which the atomic bomb resulted in a genetic preponderance of conjoined twins, who eventually become a minority subculture. The novel received mixed-to-positive reviews; Newsweek called it "brilliant and funny," and The New York Times, while praising Jackson's ambition as "truly glorious," added that "All this razzle-dazzle, all the allusions, [and] the narrative loop-de-loops [get] a bit busy." Half Life went on to win the 2006 James Tiptree, Jr. Award for science fiction and fantasy.

In 1987, Jackson married the writer Jonathan Lethem; they divorced in 1998. She currently teaches part time in the graduate writing program at The New School in New York City and at the European Graduate School in Saas-Fee.

== Works ==
=== Hypertexts ===
- Patchwork Girl (1995)
- My Body (1997) N. Katherine Hayles writes that both this work and Patchwork Girl map parts of a female body through links until "body and text become metaphors for each other."
- The Doll Games (with Pamela Jackson, 2001)

=== Books ===
- Nancy Farmer (1993). Do You Know Me. Orchard Books. ISBN 978-0-531-05474-1. Illustrated by Jackson
- Shelley Jackson (1998). The Old Woman and the Wave. DK Ink. ISBN 978-0-7894-2484-6.
- Shelley Jackson (2001). Sophia, the Alchemist's Dog. Children's book
- Shelley Jackson (2002). The Melancholy of Anatomy: Stories. Anchor Books. ISBN 978-0-385-72120-2.
- Shelley Jackson (2006-07-25). Half Life: A Novel. HarperCollins. ISBN 978-0-06-088235-8.
- Shelley Jackson (2010-04-12). Mimi's Dada Catifesto. Houghton Mifflin Harcourt. ISBN 978-0-547-48739-7.
- Jackson, Shelley (2018). Riddance: Or: The Sybil Joines Vocational School for Ghost Speakers and Hearing-Mouth Children. Black Balloon Publishing. ISBN 978-1936787999.

=== Other projects ===
- Skin: a story published on the skin of 2095 volunteers (begun 2003). This work involves tattooing a single word on each of the 2,095 volunteers. John Cayley reviews Skin in Grammalepsy, "given that the entire story cannot be read as published, this is a text that is maximally integrated with a very particular and unusual but very powerful, ethical, moral and mortal culture of human reading."
- Musée Mécanique, a Web Exclusive
- The Putti
- Wrestlemania
- Hagfish, Worm, Kakapo
- Stitching Together Narrative, Sexuality, Self: Shelley Jackson's Patchwork Girl A Review of Patchwork Girl by George Landow
- Snow (begun 2014)
- A Field Guide to Shelley Jacksons (An Aid to Identification)

== See also ==
- Electronic Literature Organization
