= Michael Joyce (writer) =

American academic and writer (born 1945)

Michael Joyce (born 1945) is a retired professor of English at Vassar College, New York, US. He is a pioneer creator and critic of electronic literature.

Joyce's afternoon, a story, 1987, was among the first literary works of hypertext fiction to present itself as undeniably serious literature, and experimented with the short-story form in novel ways. It was created with the then-new Storyspace software, deployed the ambiguity and dubious narrator characteristic of high modernism, along with some suspense and romance elements, in a story whose meaning could change dramatically depending on the path taken through its lexias on each reading. For instance, a hard-to-find series of lexias presented a new set of facts about the narrator's actions which affects the reader's judgment of the narrator. In The New York Times, Robert Coover called afternoon "the granddaddy of hypertext fictions", while The Toronto Globe and Mail said that it "is to the hypertext interactive novel what the Gutenberg bible is to publishing." His Twilight, A Symphony (1996) was his second hypertext novel.

Joyce's published books include War outside Ireland: a novel (1982), Of two minds: hypertext pedagogy and poetics (1995), Othermindedness: the emergence of network culture (2000), Moral tales and meditations: technological parables and refractions (2001) and Foucault, in Winter, in the Linnaeus Garden (2015). He is a graduate of the Iowa Writers Workshop. He was a Professor of English and Media Studies at Vassar College in Poughkeepsie. Joyce's work is collected in The NEXT Museum, a digital preservation space.

Joyce has collaborated with Los Angeles–based visual artist Alexandra Grant. The work Grant has made based on his texts ("The Ladder Quartet" and the "Six Portals") has been exhibited at the Museum of Contemporary Art, Los Angeles and Honor Fraser Gallery in Los Angeles.

== Critical references ==
- Arnaud Regnauld & Stéphane Vanderhaeghe, "Machiner le subjectif," Traduire l’hypermédia / l’hypermédia et le traduire. Cahiers virtuels du Laboratoire NT2, n° 7, Alice van der Klei & Joëlle Gauthier eds., 2014, np.
- Arnaud Regnauld, "The Ghostly Touch of the Blue Devils’ Second Coming: Reading Twelve Blue by Michael Joyce," RFEA#141 – Transferts du religieux / Religious Transfers, Paris: Belin, 2015, pp.145-158.
- Michael Joyce, "L'après-midi d'un phonème, or la faune of après-afternoon," Translating E-Lit, Arnaud Regnauld ed., Octaviana, 2015.
- Arnaud Regnauld, "Livres de sable et parcours incertains : exploration de trois cyberfictions. Michael Joyce : afternoon, a story (1987), Shelley Jackson : Patchwork Girl (1995), Mark Amerika : GRAMMATRON (1993-1997)," TLE n°28, "La vérité en fiction," Sylvie Bauer & Anne-Laure Tissut eds., Saint-Denis: Presses Universitaires de Vincennes, 2013, pp. 123–136.
- Arnaud Regnauld & Stéphane Vanderhaeghe, "afternoon, a story de Michael Joyce : vers une hypertraduction ?," Traduire à plusieurs / Collaborative Translation, Enrico Monti & Peter Schnyder eds., Orizons, Paris, 2018, pp. 399–412.
- Arnaud Regnauld, "Liquid Times —Michael Joyce’s afternoon, a story." Journal of Comparative Literature and Aesthetics, Maya Zalbidea Paniagua ed., Vishvanatha Keviraja Institute, Orissa, India, 2019, pp. 37–48.
