= Staying with the Trouble =

2016 book by Donna Haraway

Staying with the Trouble: Making Kin in the Chthulucene
- First edition
- Author: Donna Haraway
- Language: English
- Series: Experimental Futures
- Genre: Philosophy
- Publisher: Duke University Press, Durham, North Carolina
- Publication date: 2016
- Publication place: USA
- Pages: 296
- ISBN: 9780822362142
- OCLC: 972076555
- Dewey Decimal: 599.9/5
- LC Class: QL85 .H369

Staying with the Trouble: Making Kin in the Chthulucene is a 2016 book by Donna Haraway, published by Duke University Press.

== Synopsis ==
Haraway proposes new frameworks for understanding and engaging with the world. She reconceptualizes the current epoch — rather than the 'Anthropocene' she labels it the 'Chthulucene.' Hence, Haraway rejects the term Anthropocene which focuses on human impact and instead advocates for the Chthulucene. She says that the Chthulucene better captures our current epoch as one where the human and nonhuman are fundamentally interconnected in complex, and interconnected practices.

According to Haraway, this concept of entanglement requires a shift in how we create and sustain life. It requires a collective, shared creation. It rejects self-making as in human self-contained or individual creation. Haraway argues that building a more livable future depends on embracing the reality of living and dying together on a damaged planet. This approach fosters the kind of thinking necessary to find paths toward better futures. Theoretically, she brackets her work in SF signifiers, which results in organized methodologies. These are: Science Fact, Science Fiction, Speculative Feminism, Speculative Fabulation, and So Far.

== Chapter titles ==
Staying with the Trouble consists of eight chapters:

- Chapter one: "Playing String Figures with Companion Species"
- Chapter two: "Tentacular Thinking: Anthropocene, Capitalocene"
- Chapter three: "Sympoiesis and the Lively Arts of Staying with the Trouble"
- Chapter four: "Making Kin: Anthropocene, Capitalocene, Plantationcene, Chthulucene"
- Chapter five: "Awash in Urine: DES and Premarin in Multispecies Response-ability"
- Chapter six: "Sowing Worlds: A Seed Bag for Terraforming with Earth Others"
- Chapter seven: "A Curious Practice"
- Chapter eight: "The Camille Stories: Children of Compost"

== See also ==
- Precarious Life by Judith Butler
- Posthuman Bodies by Jack M. Halberstam and Ira Livingston (editors)
- How We Became Posthuman by Katherine Hayles
