= Nio (electronic literature) =

Creative work by Jim Andrews

- Author: Jim Andrews
- Language: English
- Genre: electronic literature
- Publisher: Turbulence, Electronic Literature Organization
- Publication date: 2001

Nio is an electronic literature piece of sound poetry by Jim Andrews that was first published in 2001 and that combines visual, sonic, and interactive components.

== Work description ==
The work is in two parts as an interactive audio and visual piece designed for the Web. Scott Rettberg describes this work as " a cross between a sound poem, kinetic visual art, and an interactive musical instrument." He further contends that Nio is proof that poems do not need to consist of words to be "poetic and evocative."

== Publication ==
New Radio and Performing Arts, Inc. commissioned Nio for its Turbulence website, funded by the National Endowment for the Arts. The work first appeared in Turbulence and on Jim Andrew's site, Vispo. The work was later collated into the Electronic Literature Organization's Electronic Literature Collection Volume 1. The work is under a Creative Commons Attribution-NonCommercial-NoDerivs 2.5 License. The work was exhibited at Tangible Frequences in 2006 in British Columbia, Canada. Dene Grigar reviewed this exhibition, calling Nio a beautifully conceptualized work.

== Reception ==
Mirapaul called Nio one of the most important Net art pieces and noted that it invites the user to become the co-creator of its generated audiovisual poems. Manual Portela extends this work as a form of game, detailing that "[Andrews] digital poetics transforms interactive, kinetic, and multimedia features of digital literacy into games and textual instruments." In his PhD dissertation on the work, "Typing the Dancing Signifier: Jim Andrew's (vis)poetics (2010), Leonardo Flores explains that these works are electronic texts that cannot be printed. Flores notes that Jim Andrews' work exemplifies the interplay between programming and poetry, creating dynamic reading experiences." The work was taught in courses, including Christopher Funkhouser's 2008 Digital Poetry syllabus at the New Jersey Institute of Technology.
