= Lai-Tze Fan =

Canadian storyteller and critic

Lai-Tze Fan is a Canadian digital storytelling and media theory critic, with a focus on artificial intelligence and technological designs. She holds the Canada Research Chair in Technology and Social Change, endowed by the Government of Canada.

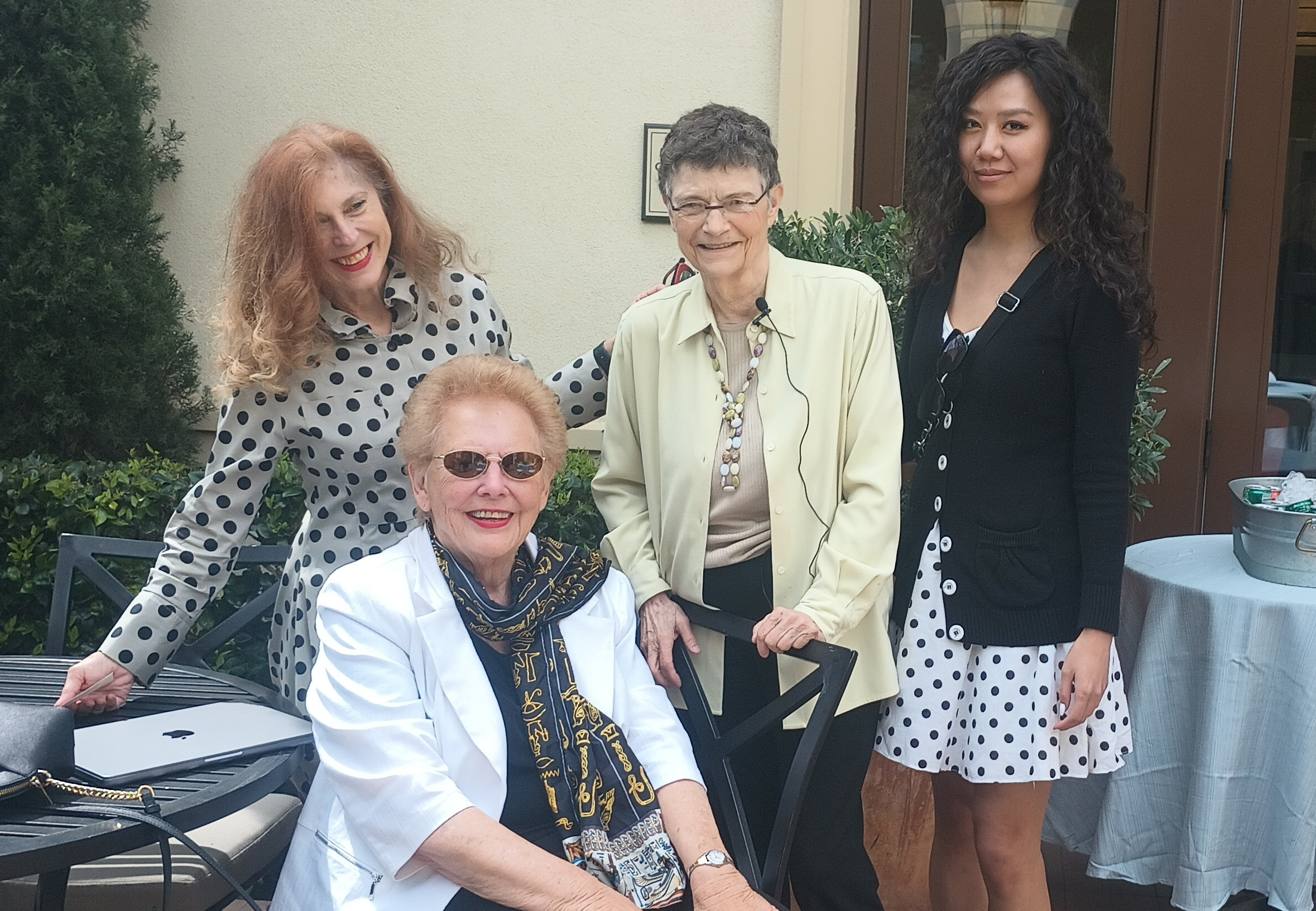
N. Katherine Hayles (sitting), Dene Grigar, Stephanie Strickland, and Lai-Tze Fan attending memorial for Marjorie Luesebrink on March 15, 2024

== Early life and education ==
Lai-Tze Fan graduated with a BA and a PhD in Communication & Culture, focused on Media & Culture, Technology in Practice, and Politics & Policy from York University in Toronto. During this time, she was a research assistant at the Modern Literature and Culture Research Centre at the Toronto Metropolitan University. Her PhD dissertation, Pre | Digital Liminalities: A Hermeneutics of the Intermedial and Materiality in the Print Intermedial Novel, focused on the interconnected roles of media networks (for example novels, film, and computers) in persuasive storytelling. Her MA is from Wilfrid Laurier University. From 2016 – 2017, she was a Postdoctoral Fellow at Concordia University in Montréal, housed in the Department of English and the Milieux Institute for Arts, Culture, and Technology.

== Career ==
In 2017, Fan served as Assistant Professor of Digital Media/Culture in the Department of Cultural Studies at Lingnan University, Hong Kong.

Currently, at the University of Waterloo, Canada, Fan is an Associate Professor in Sociology and Legal Studies, and English Language and Literature. As a Canada Research Chair, she directs the interdisciplinary U&AI Lab at Waterloo. At the University of Bergen, Norway, Fan is also a part-time associate professor at the Center for Digital Narrative.

Fan serves as the Co-Director of Waterloo's TRuST scholarly network, targeting misinformation and public trust in science, technology, and health. Her Co-Director is 2018 Nobel Laureate in Physics, Donna Strickland.

Fan was the Principal Investigator in the research project, “Using Interactive Digital Storytelling to Represent Transformative Quantum Technologies in Augmented/Extended Reality Environments” from 2021 to 2023, funded by the Tri-Council “Canada First” Research Excellence Fund. She is the Principal Investigator of the 2025 to 2030 project "Interdisciplinary Approaches toward Responsible Facial Recognition AI: Developing Technical, Ethical, and Regulatory Recommendations for Policymaking in Canada," funded by the Canadian Social Sciences and Humanities Research Council, using novel methods in diplomacy to navigate facial recognition and AI governance and policy.

Fan is one of four authors for the electronic literature work, Dim Sum, with artists from MIT and NYU Shanghai. She is also the co-author of the computationally generated poem Dial with Nick Montfort. She was a 2020 Fellow of the Electronic Literature Organization and has been on the Board of Directors since 2021.

Fan is an editor for the open-access journal Electronic Book Review and the multimodal literary journal The Digital Review. She is co-editor of the collection Post-Digital: Dialogues and Debates (Bloomsbury 2020) and the open-access collection EnTwine: Critical and Creative Teaching with Twine (Amherst College Press 2026).

== Awards and honors ==
In 2015, as a PhD student, she won the International Alliance of Digital Humanities Organizations' Young Scholar Prize for her work "On the Value of Narratives in a Reflexive Digital Humanities," later published in Digital Studies. Fan was the recipient of the 2022 N. Katherine Hayles Award for Criticism from the ELO. Fan was a runner up for the 2023 international Digital Humanities Studies Award for Best DH short publications for her article "Reverse Engineering the Gendered Design of Amazon’s Alexa: Methods in Testing Closed-Source Code in Grey and Black Box Systems." In 2024, she was a Delegate for the "Science Meets Parliament" program, for which she worked with parliamentarians and policymakers in the Government of Canada. In 2026, she was awarded the Canadian Society for Digital Humanities' Outstanding Early Career Award.

== Selected publications ==
- Murphy, Emily Christina, and Lai-Tze Fan, editors. EnTwine: Critical and Creative Teaching with Twine. Amherst College Press. Series: “Electronic Communities of Making.” 2026.
- Fan, Lai-Tze. “Reverse Engineering the Gendered Design of Amazon’s Alexa: Methods in Testing Closed-Source Code in Grey and Black Box Systems.” Digital Humanities Quarterly, vol. 17, no. 2. Special issue: “Critical Code Studies.” 2023.
- Fan, Lai-Tze, Kishonna Gray, and Aynur Kadir. “How to Design Games that Promote Racial Equity.” electronic book review. Special issue: “Critical Making, Critical Design.” 2021.
