= Califia (novel) =

2000 text by M.D. Coverley

- Author: Marjorie Luesebrink (M.D. Coverley)
- Language: English
- Genre: Fiction

Califia is a hypermedia novel written by M.D. Coverley in ToolBook II, and released in 2000 by Eastgate Systems on CD-ROM. It is considered an early influential text in the field of electronic literature.

== Origins and influences ==
M.D. Coverley began writing Califia more than twenty years before its release. She cites the USA Trilogy as an early influence. It took its first steps into hypertext in 1995 after attending a seminar at UCLA.

== Structure ==
This work was written in Toolbook, an early software platform.'

== Plot ==
Califia takes place in a reimagined California, in which a large amount of gold has gone missing at some point in the past five generations. The story is then surrounding the search for the treasure, although it remains unsolved within the work. Unlike many other hypertext novels, Califia uses links to support the reader's traversal of the work, rather than to change the meaning of the story.

=== Story structure and navigation ===
The work uses images and animation to convey the story.Califia is told through the voices of three characters, Augusta Summerland, Kaye Beveridge, and Calvin. Each character narrates through different mediums: Augusta documents the quest chronologically through journals, Kaye tells the story through myths and star charts, while Calvin presents the story through maps and documents.

In Califia, there are four journeys: The Comets in the Yard, to the south; Wind, Sand, and Stars, to the east; Night of the Bear, to the north; and The Journey Out, to the west. These occur within the story in chronological order.

== Literary significance and critical reception ==
=== Critiques ===
Califia was received positively by critics, and has been analyzed numerous times in academia.

=== Themes ===
Despite the surface goal of the reader and characters—locating the lost treasure—the emphasis in Califia is on the quest. The reader is encouraged to return to the beginning of the story after reaching the end, representing the cyclical nature of the journey.

=== Navigation ===
Navigation options within the 800 screens are key to understanding the work and the nature of reading non-linearly. As N. Katherine Hayles explains in Writing Machines, the work requires reading on multiple levels and the text is only a small portion of the meaning. The images, sounds, and links created a "topographic environment in which word was interwoven with world." N Katherine Hayles (2002) Writing Machines

== Archiving ==
As Califia is unsupported by modern devices, you can view the author's still-frame traversal of the work here.
