= Electronic Literature Lab =

Research lab and archive of old electronic literature

- Founded: 2011; 15 years ago
- Founder: Dene Grigar
- Website: https://electronicliteraturelab.org/

The Electronic Literature Lab, housed in Washington State University, Vancouver, maintains obsolete computers and hardware to preserve and present early electronic literature, video games, and internet works such as Instagram zines. It was founded in 2011 by Dene Grigar.

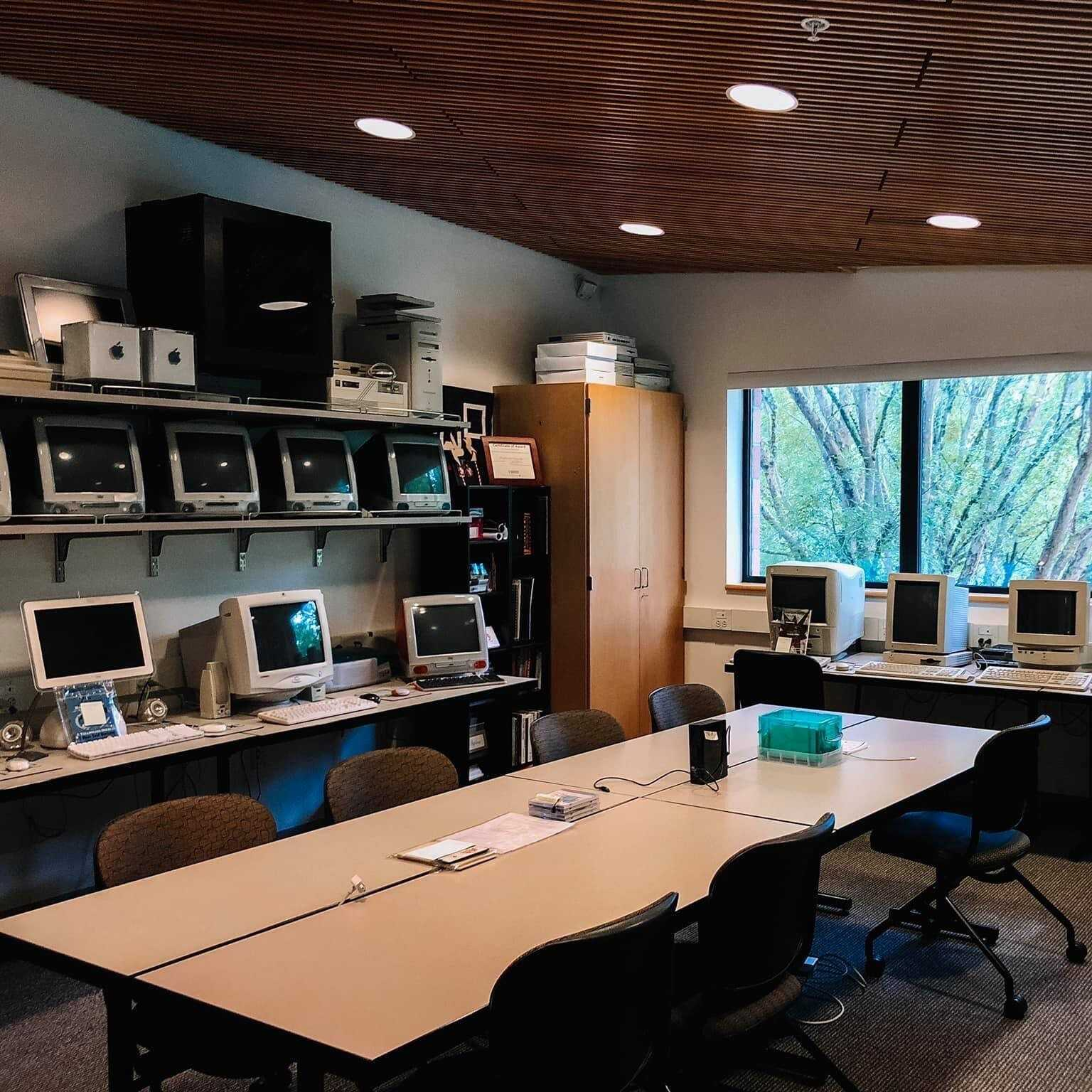
Part of the Electronic Literature Lab housed in the Washington State University at Vancouver

== Laboratory description ==
The Electronic Literature Lab holds the hardware and software that the NEXT Museum, Library, and Preservation Space depends on to show electronic literature works in their original environment. The lab forms the center of archiving electronic literature for the Electronic Literature Organization. Because electronic literature works were built on specific hardware, software, and platforms, these works are now largely inaccessible as hardware and software becomes obsolete. Thus the lab maintains over 80 vintage computers from 1977 onwards to serve over 3,000 works of electronic literature for researchers to analyze, such as the over 60 works from M.D. Coverley. The lab also hosts video games, such as Amnesia (1986).

This lab has been called unique as it is "a reading room preserves literature, art and games created on computers that cannot be printed." James O'Sullivan called it "what is possibly the greatest collection of first-generation e-lit in the Western world." As Kristin Lillvis and Melinda White note, "the Electronic Literature Lab has preserved many of these works in the collection through restoration processes involving migration and emulation to make them once-again accessible." The lab documents these archival processes in scholarly publications such as The Challenges of Born-Digital Fiction (2023) and Traversals: The Use of Preservation for Early Electronic Writing (2018).

Dene Grigar founded and directs this lab. She describes her theory of preservation for electronic items in her 2025 Ted Talk Making the Virtual Real and the Real Virtual. As Jan Beatens explained, Stuart Moulthrop and Dene Grigar explicate the challenges in this pioneering field of preserving electronic literature in the Electronic Literature Lab. Part of this work is interviews with pioneers in the electronic literature field such as Bob Stein, founder of Voyager Press.

This is a working research lab as "Kristin Lillvis and Melinda White note: "even more significantly, the Electronic Literature Lab has preserved many of these works in the collection through restoration processes involving migration and emulation to make them once-again accessible." ELL hosts online events such as the List of 280 Women E-Lit Pioneers & Visionaries (1985-2020). The lab has hosted post-graduate students and research studies into born digital works. Electronic literature critics, such as Astrid Ensslin and Mariusz Pisarski, have collaborated with WSUV students and professors to analyze and archive electronic literature works. The works from the lab were exhibited at the Library of Congress in 2013.

== Awards and grants ==
The lab received an Open Scholarship Award from the Canadian Social Knowledge Institute in 2022.

Other grant and award-winning studies at the lab included Chronicles: Documenting the Articulation of Culture in Video Games (2016), by Madeleine Brookman which garnered WSUV's 2016 Emeritus Society Undergraduate Research Award, the 2015 CAS Summer Mini-Grant, and the 2014-5 Auvril Fellowship.
