= Kishonna Gray =

American communication, gender, and Black studies researcher

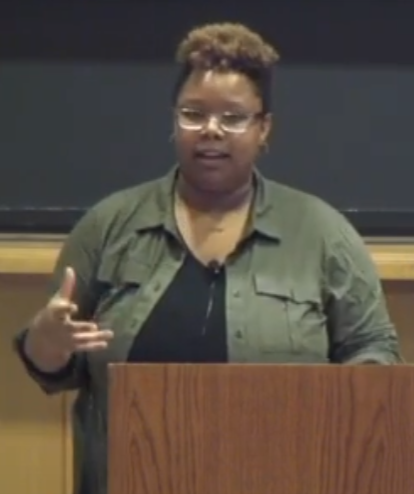
- Lecturing at the Berkman Klein Center in 2017
- Born: United States
- Education: Arizona State University School of Social Transformation, PhD
- Known for: Black experiences online, gaming, intersectional tech, #citeherwork
- Scientific career
- Fields: Communication; Gender; Women's studies African American studies
- Workplaces: University of Illinois at Chicago, Arizona State University, Massachusetts Institute of Technology, Berkman Klein Center for Internet & Society, Eastern Kentucky University, University of Michigan
- Thesis: Deviant Bodies Resisting Online: Examining the Intersecting Realities of Women of Color in Xbox Live (2011)
- Doctoral advisor: Lisa M. Anderson
- Website: www.kishonnagray.com

Kishonna L. Gray is an American communication and gender studies researcher based at the University of Michigan School of Information. Gray is best known for her research on technology, gaming, race, and gender. As an expert in Women's and Communication Studies, she has written several articles for publications such as the New York Times. In the academic year 2016–2017, she was a Visiting assistant professor in the Martin Luther King Jr. Visiting Professors and Scholars Program at the Massachusetts Institute of Technology, hosted by the Department of Women's and Gender Studies and the MIT Comparative Media Studies/Writing Program. She has also been a faculty visitor at the Berkman Klein Center for Internet & Society at Harvard University and at Microsoft Research.

== Education ==
Kishonna L. Gray received her B.S. in Criminal Justice in 2005 and M.S. in Justice Studies in 2007 at Eastern Kentucky University. She received her PhD in Justice Studies from Arizona State University in 2011. She joined the Eastern Kentucky University faculty in 2011, the Arizona State University faculty in 2017, and her position at the University of Illinois at Chicago in 2018. She also accepted a position at the University of Kentucky. Dr. Gray is currently a professor at the University of Michigan, and a faculty associate at Harvard.

== Research ==
Gray is known for her work in the areas of gender, race, and game studies. She is best known for her research on racism in video games and on intersectionality in technology. She has published multiple books: Race, Gender, & Deviance in Xbox Live: Theoretical Perspectives from the Virtual Margins; Intersectional Tech: Black users in digital gaming; and Black Cyberfeminism or How Intersectionality Went Viral (under contract). In her research, she analyzes the relationship between white hegemonic masculinity and Black identities. Gray focuses on racial dynamics specifically in streaming video games. The oppression of intersecting marginalized identities, specifically those of Black women, is at the core of her research.

Gray is the creator of the #citeherwork hashtag, created in 2015 to call attention to gender disparities in academic citation practices.

== Impact ==
Her work has been covered numerous times in the New York Times and other publications. Gray is a research leader in intersectional feminism and white misogyny. Her findings are picked up by other scholars to find solutions for biases in video games.

Her work has found its way into cyber-activism and has been cited by the Encyclopedia of Diversity and Social Justice. The encyclopedia cites how minority identities evoke a perceived threat in majority identities. Princeton Professor Wendy Belcher developed a test to analyze the choices of sources and named it the "Gray Test" after Kishonna Gray.

Gray shows the correlation between online and offline identities and the translation of racism and misogyny from a gamer world into the real world.

David G. Schwartz, in the journal of the American Library Association, CHOICE, identifies Gray's book, Intersectional tech: Black users in digital gaming, as an interdisciplinary approach to understanding oppression in new technologies. Schwartz recommends the book for scholars and game designers, as well as a work that can empower those who feel marginalized. Christopher A. Paul in the journal Critical Studies in Media Communication adds that her research helps us understand how the virtual (gaming) worlds we are creating affect real-world societies.

Her work informs game design, with articles such as the Electronic Book Review's "How to Design Games that Promote Racial Equity", co-written with Lai-Tze Fan and Aynur Kadir.

== Selected works ==
- Gray, K. L. (2012). "Intersecting oppressions and online communities: Examining the experiences of women of color in Xbox Live". Information, Communication & Society, 15(3), 411–428.
- Gray, K. L. (2012). "Deviant bodies, stigmatized identities, and racist acts: Examining the experiences of African-American gamers in Xbox Live". New Review of Hypermedia and Multimedia, 18(4), 261–276.
- Gray, K. L., & Leonard, D. J. (Eds.). (2018). Woke gaming: Digital challenges to oppression and social injustice. University of Washington Press.
- Gray, K. L. (2020). "Black Gamers' Resistance". Race and Media: Critical Approaches, 241.
- Gray, K. L. (2020). Intersectional Tech: Black users in digital gaming. LSU Press.
