= Lynn Randolph =

American artist

- Born: Lynn M Randolph; July 20, 1938
- Known for: Writing; Painting
- Notable work: Cyborg
- Movement: Contemporary; Feminist art

Lynn Randolph (born 1938) is an American feminist artist and writer known for her collaborative engagement with Donna Haraway about specific ideas relating to feminism, technoscience, political consciousness, and other social issues, formed the images and narrative of Haraway's book.

== Early life ==
Randolph grew up in Port Arthur, Texas, an oil refinery town on the Gulf Coast. Shortly thereafter she moved to Houston where she has lived and painted ever since. Her paintings have been exhibited widely in Texas and the southwest. In 1998 she had a one-person exhibition at the Arizona State University Art Museum in Tempe, Arizona. She is represented by Joan Wich Gallery in Houston, where she had one-person exhibitions in 2003 and 2006.

== Education ==
Randolph received her B.F.A from the University of Texas at Austin in 1961.
