= David Kolb =

American philosopher (born 1939)

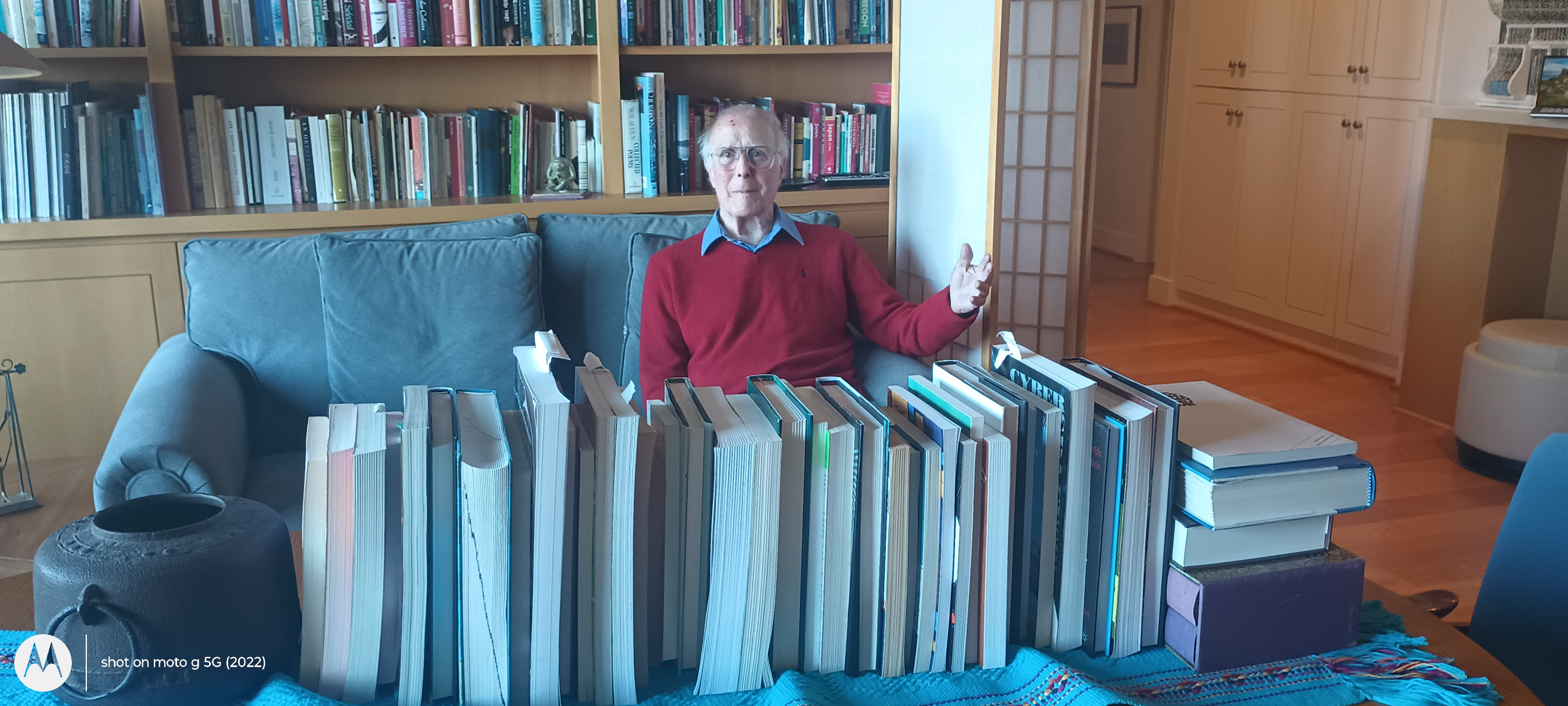
- Born: David Alan Kolb; April 15, 1939 (age 87)

Education
- Education: Fordham University (BA, MA); Yale University (MPhil, PhD)
- Thesis: Conceptual Pluralism and Rationality (1972)
- Doctoral advisor: Stephan Körner, Karsten Harries
- Other advisor: Quentin Lauer

Philosophical work
- Era: Contemporary philosophy
- Region: Western philosophy
- School: Continental philosophy German idealism Phenomenology
- Institutions: Fordham University; University of Chicago; Bates College
- Main interests: Metaphysics
- Website: dkolb.org

David Alan Kolb (born April 15, 1939) is an American philosopher and the Charles A. Dana Professor Emeritus of Philosophy at Bates College in Maine.

== Life and career ==
Kolb received a B.A. from Fordham University in 1963 and an M.A. in 1965. He later received a M.Phil. from Yale University in 1970 and a Ph.D. in 1972. Kolb's dissertation was titled "Conceptual Pluralism and Rationality." Most of Kolb's writing deals with "what it means to live with historical connections and traditions at a time when we can no longer be totally defined by that history." Professor Kolb taught at the University of Chicago before moving to Bates in 1977 and teaching there until 2005, when he took emeritus status.

== Electronic literature ==
Kolb was also an early experimenter in hypertext and electronic literature. His work, Socrates in the Labyrinth: Hypertext, Argument, Philosophy, 1994 from Eastgate Systems is a philosophical work in five files (title, Habermas Pyramid, Earth Orbit, Cleavings, and Aristotle’s Argument). The work was done in Storyspace, a hypertextual writing program. A traversal of the work with documentation and scholarship about it is archived by The NEXT Museum.

A second work, Caged Texts, was originally intended to accompany this main work, but remained unpublished until 2023, when it was resurrected in The NEXT Museum and featured in The Digital Review. Caged Texts experiments with random elements as a homage to John Cage's experimentation with random content. As Dene Grigar notes, this reimagined web version maintains the original random elements within the hypertext structure and takes advantage of web elements to also randomize the interface for a further representation of this experimental approach.

Hypertext as Resistance has colored links to guide the essay as a response to a polemic by Sanford Kwinter in the architectural theory journal Assemblage. This work is now reconstructed in The NEXT Museum.

== Selected works ==
- Kolb, David Alan (1994). "Socrates in the Labyrinth: Hypertext, Argument, Philosophy". Eastgate Systems. ASIN 1884511171. ISBN 1-884511-17-1. OL 8701290M. Wikidata Q124710985. ;
- Kolb, David Alan (1997), Scholarly Hypertext: Self-represented Complexity, Association for Computing Machinery, pp. 29–37, doi:10.1145/267437.267441, Wikidata Q124710634
- Kolb, David Alan (2010). "Ahead to the Past: Scholarly Communication Returns to the Seventeenth Century". Journal of Curriculum and Pedagogy. 7 (2): 35–38. doi:10.1080/15505170.2010.10471334. Wikidata Q124710914.
- Kolb, David Alan (1988). The critique of pure modernity: Hegel, Heidegger, and after. ISBN 978-0-226-45029-2. OCLC 22696075. OL 9482774M. Wikidata Q124710979.
- Kolb, David Alan (1992). Postmodern sophistications: philosophy, architecture, and tradition. University of Chicago Press. ISBN 978-0-226-45028-5. OL 9459513M. Wikidata Q124711046.

== See also ==
- American philosophy
- List of Bates College people
- Lists of philosophers
- List of American philosophers
