= Stephanie Strickland =

American poet

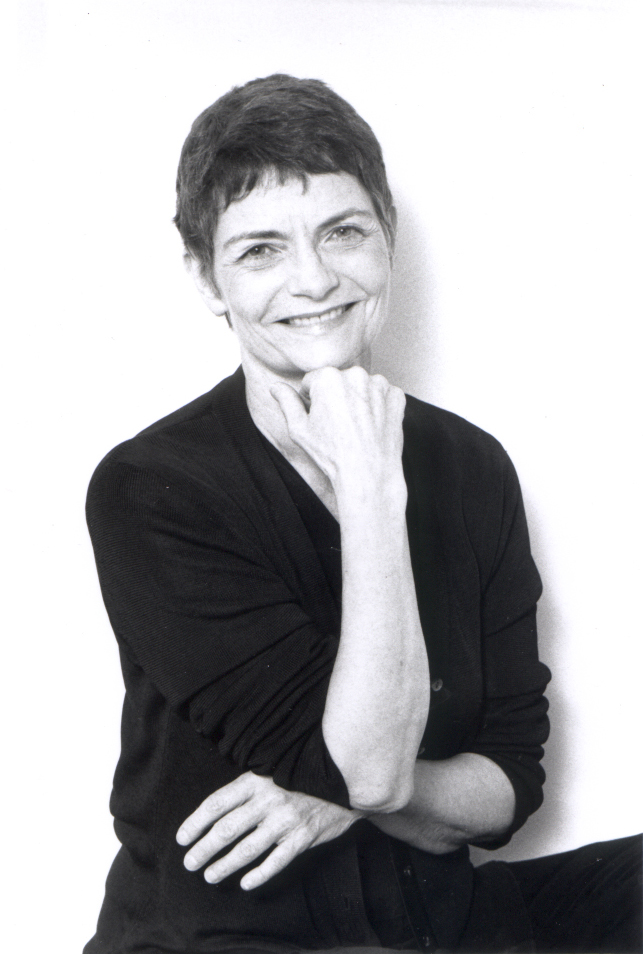
- photo by Star Black
- Born: February 22, 1942 (age 84); Detroit, Michigan
- Education: Harvard University; Sarah Lawrence College; Pratt Institute
- Occupations: Author, poet
- Writing career
- Genres: Poetry, Digital Poetry, Essays

Stephanie Strickland (born February 22, 1942) is a poet living in New York City. She has published ten volumes of print poetry and co-authored twelve digital poems. Her files and papers are being collected by the David M. Rubenstein Rare Book And Manuscript Library at Duke University.

== Life ==
Strickland was born in Detroit, lived for five years in Glen Ellyn, Illinois, and attended Horace Greeley High School in Chappaqua, New York. She studied at Harvard University (A.B. 1963), Sarah Lawrence College (M.F.A. 1979), and Pratt Institute (M.S. 1984).

From 1978-1990, she worked at the Sarah Lawrence College Library as Head of Access Services, Automated Services Librarian, and Women's Studies Reference Specialist. She served on the Board of the Hudson Valley Writers’ Center from 1983-1995 and 1999-2005 and as editor at Slapering Hol Press from 1990-2005. She currently serves on the board of directors of the Electronic Literature Organization.

Strickland held the 2002 McEver Chair in Writing at the Georgia Institute of Technology where she created, curated and produced the TechnoPoetry Festival 2002. Other invited appointments have included Distinguished Visiting Writer at Boise State University; Hugo Visiting Writer at University of Montana Missoula, Visiting Poet in Residence at Columbia College Chicago; and Visiting Poet in Residence in the MFA-PhD program at the University of Utah. Strickland presented at the &NOW Festival in 2004, 2006, 2008, 2009, and 2011, and frequently at the Society for Literature, Science, and the Arts (SLSA). She co-edited volume 1 of the Electronic Literature Organization's Electronic Literature Collection and the Fall 2007 issue of the Iowa Review Web, Multi-Modal Coding.

== Works ==
=== Books of poetry ===
- Ringing the Changes. Counterpath Press. 2020. ISBN 978-1-933996-71-4.
- How the Universe Is Made, Poems New & Selected (1985-2019). Ahsahta Press. 2019. ISBN 978-1-934103-87-6.
- V : WaveTercets / Losing L'una. SpringGun Press. 2014. ISBN 978-0-9832218-8-3.
- Dragon Logic. Ahsahta Press. 2013. ISBN 978-1934103456.
- Zone : Zero. Ahsahta Press. 2008. ISBN 978-1-934103-01-2.
- V : WaveSon.nets / Losing L'una. Penguin Books. 2002. ISBN 978-0-14-200245-2.
- True North. University of Notre Dame Press. 1997. ISBN 978-0-268-01899-3.
- The Red Virgin: A Poem of Simone Weil. University of Wisconsin Press. 1993. ISBN 978-0-299-13994-0.
- Give the Body Back. University of Missouri Press. 1991. ISBN 978-0-8262-0809-5.
- Beyond This Silence. State Street Press. 1986.

=== Works of trans-medial, electronic, and digital literature ===
- Liberty Ring!. 2020. With Ian Hatcher. First published in Nokturno.
- Hours of the Night. 2016. With M.D. Coverley. First exhibited at ELO2016.
- House of Trust. 2014. Archived from the original on August 19, 2014. With Ian Hatcher. The Volta: Evening Will Come, Issue 44, August 2014.
- Vniverse iPad app. 2015. With Ian Hatcher.
- Duels-Duets. 2013. With Nick Montfort. New Binary Press, 2014.
- Sea and Spar Between. 2010. With Nick Montfort. Dear Navigator issue 1:3, Winter 2010. (Also online: how to read the work and an archived copy of its original introductory page.) John Cayley reviewed this work "is a tour de force of unambiguously literary, unambiguously computational, digital literature art."
- slippingglimpse. 2007. With Cynthia Lawson Jaramillo and Paul Ryan. Reviewed
- V : Vniverse. 2002. With Cynthia Lawson Jaramillo. The Iowa Review Web, 2002.
- Errand Upon Which We Came. 2001. With M.D. Coverley. Cauldron & Net 3, 2000-2001.
- The Ballad of Sand and Harry Soot. Word Circuits. 1999.
- To Be Here as Stone Is. 1999. With M.D. Coverley. Riding the Meridian volume 1 no. 2, 1999.
- True North (hypertext). Eastgate Systems. 1997. ISBN 1-884511-36-8.

Resources for study of Strickland's early works include:

- Strickland recorded a reading from slippingglimpse during "A Toast to the Flash Generation" on December 31, 2020, sponsored by the Electronic Literature Organization, as Adobe Flash ceased working in web browsers.
- Patricia Tomaszek has recorded a screencast of Errand Upon Which We Came that includes an interview with Strickland.
- Dene Grigar and her team at Washington State University Vancouver host documentation related to True North including a traversal of the hypertext, social media content, photos, the author's prologue to the traversal, and an essay by Grigar.
- Astrid Ensslin's work, Pre-web Digital Publishing and the Lore of Electronic Literature

=== Essays ===
Essays by Strickland include:

- Late to the Party in Chapter One: On Becoming a Poet, Marsh Hawk Press, 2020.
- Joined at the Hip: Simone Weil, Quentin Meillassoux in Religion & Literature 45.3. (Autumn 2013 issue, appeared in 2015.)
- Spars of Language Lost at Sea, with Nick Montfort. Electronic Literature Organization conference paper, Paris, 2013. Formules 18, 2014.
- cut to fit the tool-spun course, with Nick Montfort. Digital Humanities Quarterly 7.1, 2013.
- Poetry & the Digital World, English Language Notes 47.1 Special Issue: Experimental Literary Education, 2009; reprinted in Hidden Agendas: Unreported Poetics, Louis Armand, editor. Litteraria Pragensia Books. Prague, Czech Republic, 2010.
- Born Digital. Poetry Foundation, 2009.
- Dovetailing Details Fly Apart - All Over Again, In Code, In Poetry, In Chreods, with Cynthia Lawson Jaramillo, 2007; introduced by Joseph Tabbi, with additional links, in electronic book review, 2007.
- Quantum Poetics: Six Thoughts, in Media Poetry: An International Anthology. Eduardo Kac, editor. Intellect Press, Bristol, UK, 2007.
- Writing the Virtual: Eleven Dimensions of E-Poetry. Leonardo Electronic Almanac special issue on New Media Poetry and Poetics, Vol 14 No. 5 - 6, 2006.
- Possibilities of Being: Poetry Speaking with Science. Isotope 4.1, Spring-Summer 2006.
- Poetry in the Electronic Environment. electronic book review, 2005.
- Moving Through Me as I Move: A Paradigm for Interaction. First Person: New Media as Story, Performance and Game. Wardrip-Fruin, N. and Harrigan, P., editors. MIT Press, 2004.

=== Interviews ===
CUNY-based Dichtung Yammer has published an extended interview of Strickland by Ian Hatcher, "Exchange On Stephanie Strickland's How the Universe Is Made: Poems New & Selected, 1985-2019 and Ringing the Changes."

A recent interview in print is The CounterText Interview: Stephanie Strickland, conducted by Mario Aquilina and Ivan Callus. It appears in CounterText, Volume 2 Issue 2, pp 113–129, ISSN 2056-4406, Edinburgh University Press, 2016.

Audio interviews that primarily discuss the poems in Dragon Logic have been recorded by Kylan Rice for likewise audio, Tony Trigilio for Radio Free Albion, and Eric LeMay for New Books in Literature.

=== Journals and anthologies ===
Strickland's poems have appeared in more than 90 journals, including The Paris Review, Grand Street, New American Writing, Ploughshares, jubilat, Chicago Review, Boston Review, Denver Quarterly, Fence, LIT, Chain, Harvard Review, 1913 a journal of forms, The Iowa Review, Colorado Review, Black Clock, Vlak, Western Humanities Review, and Conditions.

Strickland's print poems have appeared in anthologies such as Four Quartets: Poetry in the Pandemic (2020), Poetics for the More-than-Human World (2020), Devouring the Green: Fear of a Human Planet (2015), Best American Poetry (2013), Electronic Literature Collection/2 (2011), The &NOW Awards: The Best Innovative Writing (2009), The Notre Dame Review: The First Ten Years (2009), Strange attractors: poems of love and mathematics (Sarah Glaz, editor, A K Peters, Ltd. 2008), and A Sing Economy, Flim Forum Anthology 2 (2008).

Online, Strickland's poems have been published by The Poetry Foundation, The Iowa Review Web, MiPOesias, Octopus, Drunken Boat, Poetry Daily, Sous Rature, Mad Hatters’ Review, Saint Elizabeth Street, Critiphoria, La Fovea, Hyperrhiz: New Media Cultures, Riding the Meridian, Cauldron & Net, Web Del Sol Editor’ s Picks, electronic book review, Word Circuits Gallery, Blue Moon, The New River, Furtherfield, Poets for Living Waters, Codex: A Journal of Critical and Creative Writing for your Mobile Device, and Big Other.

After their first appearance, Strickland's electronic works have been republished. Sea and Spar Between was included in Rattapallax 21: Current State of Poetry Generators (2013), Bibliotheca Invisibilis: Conceptualizations of the Invisible (2014), and (in Polish) TechSty 2014, n.1 (9) (2014). slippingglimpse was included in hyperrhiz: new media cultures no. 4 (2008), Poets for Living Waters (2010), The Electronic Literature Collection Volume 2 (2011), and Rattapallax 21: Current State of Poetry Generators (2013). V : Vniverse was included in The Electronic Literature Collection Volume 2 (2011).

Strickland's work has been included in remixes. For example, "Versus Vega: Precessing" by Jason Nelson (Furtherfield, 2005) incorporates elements of Strickland's work, and the JavaScript code from Sea and Spar Between was used by Mark Sample to create House of Leaves of Grass.

== Critical reception ==
For the 2022 Critical Code Studies Working Group, Carly Schnitzler wrote, "Because the Ringing [of] the Changes is automated, permutable, and ongoing, with Strickland and her team of programmers setting it into motion and simply letting it run, it seems to act as a force for and representative of reality, constant reminders that things (our society’s treatment of the environment, of structural inequity and violence ...) need to change, regardless of if we (any humans engaged with the work—producers or consumers ...) are paying attention to them or not. Looking at and playing with the underlying code, though, seems to complicate this initial read of the role of human attention in (and to) the piece, with divisions emerging (as they do) around form and content."

In electronic book review, Lai-Tze Fan explained the impact of Ringing the Changes: "Strickland continues the tradition of poetic text generation, engaging at the same with material constraints resulting from 17th century pattern-ringing. The practice consists of competing teams ringing church bells based on highly complex mathematical patterns. Building on these, the poet and her team created elaborate and complex algorithms that generate the poetry woven out of textual data harvested from writings of Sha Xin Wei, Simone Weil, Hito Steyerl, and Yuk Hui among others. Written with Python code, the work demonstrates the powerful 'poetics of juxtaposition', where the list of names of Black men and women subjected to state-sanctioned violence strongly resonates throughout the whole text."

In the same publication, Sarah Whitcomb Laiola's review stated, "The textual data feeding this algorithm and surfacing, as poetry, according to mathematical patterns address a range of topics: reflections on art and media, histories of information and its categorization, lessons in computational logic and quantum physics, discussions of technologies and textiles, and narratives of storytelling and/as human movement. The poetry that emerges, then, is a deftly woven text/ile that brings together such disparate elements so that each might resonate beyond its own (con)textual limits."

Reviewing Dragon Logic for The Common, Terese Svoboda wrote, "No poet has plumbed or plummed with her thumb so deeply into the pies (π's) of physics, math, and myth and made them interlock on the atomic level. She's brilliant, slyly funny and profound." Other notable readings of the poems within Dragon Logic include Julie Marie Wade's review, "The Periscopic Poetics of Stephanie Strickland's Dragon Logic," for The Iowa Review, and Orchid Tierney's review, "Code as such," for Jacket2.

In a speech at the Library of Congress in 2013, Stuart Moulthrop called Sea and Spar Between, "possibly the greatest example of electronic literature yet attempted -- measured by volume, at least -- but arguably also on a scale of importance." Michael Leong wrote, of Sea And Spar Between, "The output ... is a rich, combinatorial poem in its own right, but it also offers the productively defamiliarizing experience of reading Melville and Dickinson 'at a distance,' giving us a 'slant' perspective on two very familiar, canonical authors. ... We can say that Montfort and Strickland's poetics privileges neither the sea nor the spar but the between."

Reviewing Zone : Zero, Djelloul Marbrook wrote, "For exploring the outer spaces of poetry Zone : Zero is practically a handbook. Placement is everything here. ... recalling as it does the profound commitment of so many medieval Arab, Berber and Jewish poets to mathematics and science. There is no earthly reason to segregate these disciplines other than for the convenience of popularizers who write about them." Rachel Daley's review described how, "poetry as a practice is renewed as relevant, applicable, accessible, and understandable ... when it opens readers’ own mechanisms for reading language to a slightly unprecedented but shared capability. Stephanie Strickland's Zone : Zero enacts and constitutes this shift."

In an essay citing slippingglimpse an example of socially distributed cognition, N. Katherine Hayles has described how slippingglimpse "is located within philosophical, technical, and aesthetic contexts that create a richer sense of information than the disembodied version that emerged from early cybernetics."

In "Nature’s Agents: Chreods, Code, Plato, and Plants", Lisa Swanstrom describes the effect of slippingglimpse: "...to make language look organic, to make these pieces of verse, in the tradition of the concrete poets and the image poets, crawl out of the sequential nature of written language in order to try on a different form. They remain words and phonemes beholden to English syntax, yes, but they also become part of a larger natural sign system, one comprised of water currents and chreodic patterns, algorithms and data flows."

In "Iteration, you see: Floating Text and Chaotic Reading/Viewing in slippingglimpse," Gwen Le Cor writes, "...by shedding the solidity of stable written text and presenting a liquid text in motion, slippingglimpse is also asking us to loosen our metaphors of writing, and discard the solidity that weaving metaphors imply. Text is no longer textile, it is texture, and in this particular case it is liquid texture."

In reviewing V: Wave.Son.Nets/Losing L'Una, Edward Falco described Strickland as, "urging readers to listen carefully, with body as well as mind, to see through the constructs the mind establishes to see into the world, to see what may be beyond mind, what the mind is not wired to see; and most of all to resist the static and hierarchical while accepting the fluid and enmeshed. In this sense, Strickland, like Dickinson before her, is a deeply spiritual poet, and one who, incidentally, is genuinely exploring the possibilities of digital writing to reshape the conventions of literature."

Writing for The Iowa Review Web, Jaishree Odin analyzed The Ballad of Sand and Harry Soot as follows: "Thematically, The Ballad is about unrequited love between Sand and Soot; at another level, it is about the art of navigation through multiple discourses that constitute human experience. In some ways, it also alludes to the computer-generated electronic spaces and humans who interact with these spaces. The sophisticated conception and design of this hypermedia work brings together a variety of discourses from art, science, mathematics, philosophy, and even mythology to create a weave of texts."

In Contemporary Women's Writing, Sally Evans wrote of The Ballad of Sand and Harry Soot, "...Sand as a figure of cyberfemininity is frequently described in ways that trouble the clear boundaries between the organic and electronic selves ... Significantly, Sand's hybridity also makes her excessive, a self beyond the neat categorizations of human or machine. She is a point of articulation between organic and inorganic matter, and her contact with Harry Soot serves to entangle further human qualities such as frailty and emotion with the supposedly infallible electronic world."

Joseph Tabbi has written on True North, in Cognitive Fictions and electronic book review: "Strickland's poetics of indirect citation, annotation, and recombination creates affinities with a distinctive (and mostly American) tradition that reaches back through Dickinson to Jonathan Edwards. Her willingness to court abstraction and a minimalist language (at the risk of occasional unreadability) opens what should be a fruitful conversation with the Language poets, while the recognition awarded True North by the judges for the Sandeen Prize ensures that her work will be welcomed into the domestic spaces of contemporary social realism no less than the more public-minded collectivities represented at meetings of the Modern Language Association and the Society for Literature, Science, and the Arts (where Strickland has given readings)."

Originally written in Catalan, the detailed study Poesía Digital: Deena Larsen y Stephanie Strickland by Oreto Doménech i Masià was published in a Spanish translation by the University of Valencia in 2015.

Marjorie Luesebrink reviewed Slipping Glimpses in #WomenTechLit as a landmark innovation. "Reading in this poem is accomplished by human and non-human agents, treated with equal respect."

Stephanie Strickland worked closely with Marjorie Luesebrink and cowrote several projects with her, including Hours of the Night, exhibited at the 216 ELO Art Exhibit and featured in the Hyperrhiz 2017 gallery.

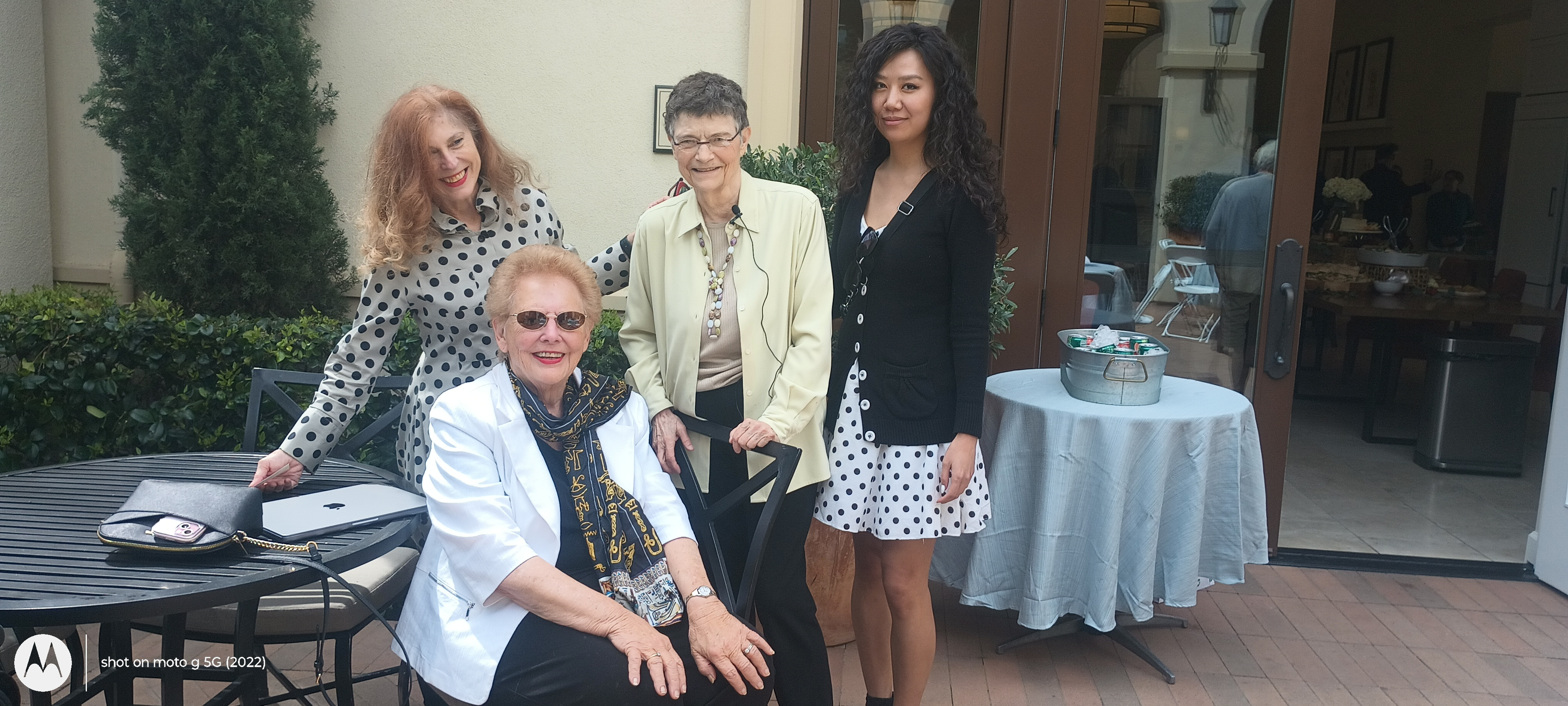
N. Katherine Hayles, Dene Grigar, Stephanie Strickland, and Lai-Tze Fan attending memorial for Marjorie Luesebrink March 15, 2024, Irvine, California.

== Awards and grants ==
- Electronic Literature Organization’s Marjorie C. Luesebrink Lifetime Career Achievement Award, 2023
- Lifetime Achievement Award, Big Other, 2020
- Pushcart Prize: Best of the Small Presses, 2015
- &NOW Award: The Best Innovative Writing, 2014 and 2009
- Best American Poetry 2013, Scribner 2013
- Poetry Society of America's Alice Fay di Castagnola Award, awarded to V: WaveSon.nets / Losing L’una, Brenda Hillman, judge, 2000
- First Prize, Boston Review Poetry Contest, for Ballad of Sand and Harry Soot, Heather McHugh, judge, 1999 (also the About.com Best of Net award)
- Salt Hill Hypertext Prize, awarded to True North, 1998
- Ernest Sandeen Poetry Prize, University of Notre Dame Press, awarded to True North, John Matthias, judge, 1997
- Poetry Society of America's Alice Fay di Castagnola Award, awarded to True North, Barbara Guest, judge, 1996
- Brittingham Prize, University of Wisconsin Press, awarded to The Red Virgin: A Poem of Simone Weil, Lisel Mueller, judge, 1993

Strickland has received awards from National Endowment for the Arts (Poetry) and National Endowment for the Humanities (Hypertext). She has received fellowships from the MacDowell Colony, Yaddo, Djerassi, and Ragdale.
