= How We Became Posthuman =

1999 book on technology, information, and humanity by N. Katherine Hayles

- Author: N. Katherine Hayles
- Language: English
- Subject: Posthumanism, Critical theory, Philosophy
- Genre: Scholarly monograph
- Publisher: University of Chicago Press
- Publication place: United States
- Pages: 366
- Awards: René Wellek Prize (2000)
- OCLC: 894210852
- LC Class: Q335.H394 1999
- Website: https://press.uchicago.edu/ucp/books/book/chicago/H/bo3769963.html

How We Became Posthuman:Virtual Bodies in Cybernetics, Literature, and Informatics is a scholarly monograph by N. Katherine Hayles published in 1999 by University of Chicago Press. It is one of the first works to propose posthumanism as a philosophical framework for understanding literature, science, and society.

Hayles sees the posthuman not as the end of humanity, but as "the end of a certain conception of the human" that is tied to liberal humanism and the idea of the human as an autonomous subject. This, Hayles writes, is "a conception that may have applied, at best, to that fraction of humanity who had the wealth, power, and leisure to conceptualize themselves as autonomous beings exercising their will through individual agency and choice." Posthumanism for Hayles is a way to rethink the relationship between humans and computers and between embodiment and information. Hayles uses both literary analysis and science and technology studies to develop her arguments, building upon cybernetics, feminist theory and philosophy.

How We Became Posthuman won the American Comparative Literature Association's René Wellek Prize in 2000, for the best book published in the field of comparative literature.

== Book summary ==
1. Toward Embodied Virtuality

This chapter examines the traditional notions of mind and body and society separations, and notes that the idea of disembodiment blurs the lines between humans and intelligent machines. Hayles relates how humanism has viewed individuals as separate from bodies and society and notes how feminists and other theorists contest these claims. She explains the history of cybernetics and examines how perceptions of human embodiment have changed with successive technological advances. She uses three intertwined narratives to emphasize the importance of cultural narratives in understanding technological and scientific advances.

2. Virtual Bodies and Flickering Signifiers

Hayles examines the changing nature of media from print to digital, noting the possibilities of electronic literature, and explores the changing feedback loop between reading practices and technology. She contends that information exists beyond its physical embodiment. Hayles wrote a previous 1993 article with this same title as this chapter.

3. Contesting for the Body of Information: The Macy Conferences on Cybernetics

Hayles summarizes insights from the Macy conferences on Cybernetics, which were a forum for investigating the nature of information as a disembodied medium and explores opinions on the nature of information and its relationship to materiality—and how that thinking has evolved with changing technology after WWII.

4. Liberal Subjectivity Imperiled: Norbert Wiener and Cybernetic Anxiety

This chapter explores the relationships between humans and tools, from Gregory Bateson's analogy of a blind man's cane through Donna Haraway's "Manifesto for Cyborgs" that explains how the extension of a human body through tools (cyborgs) merges biological organisms with technological devices. Hayles also examines Norbert Wiener's study of the implications of cybernetics and theories on entropy.

5. From Hyphen to Splice: Cybernetic Syntax in Limbo

This chapter examines Bernard Wolfe’s 1952 novel Limbo, placing it as a critique of post-World War II technological changes and how these changes affected American culture and politics. Hayles uses this work to show how humans are emerging as information processing systems, showing the work as a commentary on gender and human identity within changing technologies.

6. The Second Wave of Cybernetics: From Reflexivity to Self-Organization

This chapter explores the works of Warren McCulloch, Walter Pitts, Heinz von Foerster, and Jerry Lettvin, and asserts that human sensations and cognition create reality. Hayles uses these insights to question agency, identity, and the essence of being. She connects historical and contemporary discussions of human evolution, society transformations, and the development of cybernetics.

7. Turning Reality Inside Out and Right Side Out: Boundary Work in the Mid-Sixties Novels of Philip K. Dick

Hayles explores Philip K. Dick's works, particularly Roy Baty in "Do Androids Dream of Electric Sheep?", Dr. Bloodmoney", and Ubik to question relationships between artificial intelligence, society, and humans. Dick's work reinforces the contentions that the observer creates reality, and questions the nature of existence.

8. The Materiality of Informatics

This chapter connects ideas from Jean Baudrillard, Arthur Kroker, and Michel Foucault to explore "embodiment amidst virtuality" and how perceptions about bodies and information changes with technological advances. Hayles uses William Burroughs’ experiments with tape recorders to emphasize these connections.

9. Narratives of Artificial Life

This chapter examines the development of artificial systems up to 1999, including work by Humberto Maturana and Francisco Varela, which suggest redefining human systems to encompass implications about artificial systems The chapter explains the Tierra Program as Thomas Ray proposed it in the Fourth Conference on Artificial Life in 1994. This program proposed creating virtual organisms programmed to evolve and adapt, changing perspectives on biodiversity. Hayles argues for a more nuanced understanding of humans, information, and machines by using these examples.

10. The Semiotics of Virtuality: Mapping the Posthuman

Hayles proposes a semiotic square as a tool to examine patterns and randomness. She then explicates four novels (Blood Music, Terminal Games, Galatea 2.2, and Snow Crash) to illustrate diverse perspectives and definitions of the posthuman, and uses these novels as examples to explore questions of mutation, materiality, and information, presenting tposthumanism as a mosaic of concepts, with intertangled relationships between traditional humanist values and posthuman technological realities.

11. Conclusion: What Does It Mean to be Posthuman?

The conclusions contend that human experience and embodiment is enriched from technology.

== Reception and criticism ==
Within the field of posthuman studies, Hayles's How We Became Posthuman (1999) is considered "the key text which brought posthumanism to broad international attention". Jule Owen, science and speculative fiction author, claims that " This book is essential reading for anyone interested in the future of humanity and the evolving nature of human identity." Nathaniel Stern, best known for his work across digital, interactive, and installation art, summarizes this book as re-membering (embodying again) how humans and data "lost their materiality" in people's minds and that this loss of materiality is "dead wrong, and that there are major stakes in that misperception". As Linda Brigham, American literary scholar and Associate Professor Emeritus at Kansas State University notes "How We Became Posthuman tells a twentieth-century tale of "how information lost its body". Bookey calls the work "an essential exploration of our current and future relationship with technology." Jessper Olsson, in Classics of Media Theory, explains that this work gives a "productive conception of the posthuman."

Reactions to Hayles's writing style, general organization, and scope of the book have been mixed. The book is generally praised for displaying depth and scope in its combining of scientific ideas and literary criticism. Linda Brigham also claims that Hayles manages to lead the text "across diverse, historically contentious terrain by means of a carefully crafted and deliberate organizational structure". However, some scholars find her prose difficult to read or over-complicated. Andrew Pickering describes the book as "hard going" and lacking of "straightforward presentation". Dennis Weiss of York College of Pennsylvania accuses Hayles of "unnecessarily complicat[ing] her framework for thinking about the body", for example by using terms such as "body" and "embodiment" ambiguously. Weiss, nevertheless, acknowledges as convincing her use of science fiction in order to reveal how "the narrowly focused, abstract constellation of ideas" of cybernetics circulate through a broader cultural context. Craig Keating of Langara College on the contrary argues that the obscurity of some texts questions their ability to function as a conduit for scientific ideas.

Several scholars reviewing How We Became Posthuman highlight the strengths and shortcomings of her book vis a vis its relationship to feminism. Amelia Jones of University of Southern California describes Hayles's work as reacting to the misogynistic discourse of the field of cybernetics. As Pickering writes, Hayles's promotion of an "embodied posthumanism" challenges cybernetics' "equation of human-ness with disembodied information" for being "another male trick to feminists tired of the devaluation of women's bodily labor". Stephanie Turner of Purdue University also describes Hayles's work as an opportunity to challenge prevailing concepts of the human subject which assume the body was white, male, and European, but suggests Hayles's dialectic method may have taken too many interpretive risks, leaving some questions open about "which interventions promise the best directions to take".

Reviewers are mixed about Hayles's construction of the posthuman subject. Weiss describes Hayles's work as challenging the simplistic dichotomy of human and post-human subjects in order to "rethink the relationship between human beings and intelligent machines", however suggests that in her attempt to set her vision of the posthuman apart from the "realist, objectivist epistemology characteristic of first-wave cybernetics", she too, falls back on universalist discourse, premised this time on how cognitive science is able to reveal the "true nature of the self". Jones similarly describes Hayles's work as reacting to cybernetics' disembodiment of the human subject by swinging too far towards an insistence on a "physical reality" of the body apart from discourse. Jones argues that reality is rather "determined in and through the way we view, articulate, and understand the world".

== Awards ==
The work received Eaton Award for best book in science fiction theory and criticism, and Rene Wellek Prize for best book in literary theory, American Comparative Literature Association, both 1998–99. The Village Voice cited this work as "one of the best twenty-five books of 1999."

== Publication history ==
The work was originally published February 1, 1999 by the University of Chicago Press.
