= Uncle Buddy's Phantom Funhouse =

1993 multimedia hypermedia text by John McDaid

Uncle Buddy's Phantom Funhouse is an early multimedia hypermedia text written by John McDaid and released by Eastgate Systems in 1993. The main portion of Funhouse was written for Macintosh's HyperCard app, but portions of the hypermedia novel are also contained in the original box (containing artifacts from Uncle Buddy's literary estate, including physical tapes, playing cards, and pieces of paper). The use of transmedia storytelling, meta-fiction, and epistolary format makes this a potential early example of an alternate reality game.

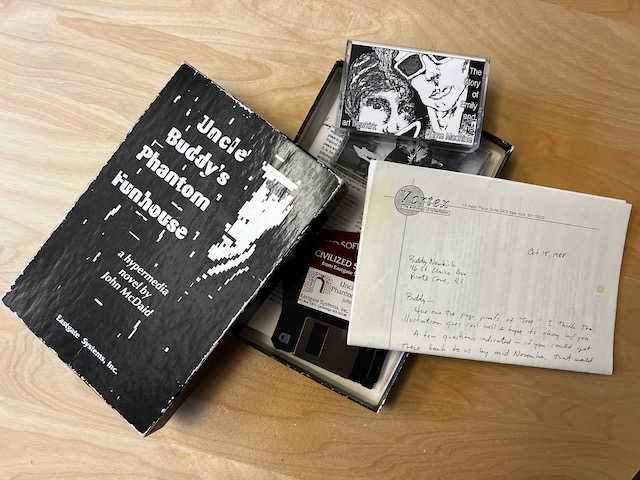
A copy of Uncle Buddy's Phantom Funhouse in original physical format.

== Plot ==
Funhouse is framed as a collection of items that belonged to a person named Art "Uncle Buddy" Newkirk, which have been turned over to the reader by a team of lawyers following their untimely demise. The plot is nonlinear and dependent on the order in which a player navigates the in game links and physical media. Uncle Buddy is a college prankster, rock musician, literary critic and rebel.

== Platform ==
=== HyperCard components ===
This HyperCard novel' contains short animations and sound. The HyperCard portion of Funhouse contains an alphabetically organized series of files, with one titled "READ THIS FIRST". Upon clicking this file, a letter from Art Newkirk's lawyers pops up, explaining that he has died and his estate has been given to the player. The player enters their name and signs a legal agreement ensuring they can handle the disturbing nature of any documents contained in the game.

After signing the agreement, the player enters the Funhouse, navigating Newkirk's files and reading through his last documented works, emails, and drafts. Notable files include a dictionary of slang specific to Newkirk's friend group, a review of Newkirk's work by a game reviewer, and a collection of virtual tarot cards. Delving deeper, the player can access an inverted version of the Funhouse, whose works are written by an alternative identity of Newkirk's named Emily Kean. This version of the Funhouse is distorted and much darker in tone.

=== Physical elements ===
Uncle Buddy's Phantom Funhouse originally shipped with a letter to Art from a friend named Chris, 2 cassette tapes from Art Newkirk's band, and a clipped article. The work originally shipped with five floppy disks, which later were combined into a single CD ROM. for the Macintosh software program HyperCard. Eastgate Systems (publisher) and John McDaid termed the shipping box the "Chocolate Box of Death" as the black and silver box contained the floppy disk/cd, two audio cassettes (Retribution and The Story of Emily and the Time Machine), letter from editor of Vortex Magazine, "Tree" essay, registration cards. Version 4 of Uncle Buddy's Funhouse from The NEXT Museum, Library, and Preservation Space, created in 2023, is a web-based reconstruction of these physical media as playable elements.

== Origins and influences ==
The seed for Uncle Buddy's Phantom Funhouse was first planted when McDaid was prompted by a friend to create a piece of fiction that could not be written by a 20th century author, and was further spurred on by the release of Michael Joyce's afternoon. Funhouse began development in 1986, inspired by an experience in which the author's "dying Aunt Rita sent him a See's candy box filled with odds and ends that constituted a portion of her "estate" that she wished to give McDaid". A dictionary portion of the work also takes great influences from The Dictionary of the Khazars.

== Publication history ==
Uncle Buddy's Phantom Funhouse was initially released in 1993, from Eastgate Systems with a box that contained a choice of either five floppy disks (Version 1) or a CD-ROM (Version 2).

John McDaid created and uploaded an emulated edition to the Internet Archive in January 2018.

Students in the Creative Media & Digital Culture at the Washington State University at Vancouver and the Electronic Literature Lab developed an archival version using HTML5, CSS, and JavaScript. This work is housed in The NEXT Museum, Library, and Preservation Space. This emulation process for Uncle Buddy's Phantom Funhouse and original screenshots are detailed in The Challenges of Born-Digital Fiction: Editions, Translations, and Emulations.

== Literary significance and critical reception ==
In the 1993 New York Times Book Review, Hyperfiction: Novels for the Computer, Robert Coover, noted the "sheer pleasure of play in John McDaid's many-roomed funhouse."

Uncle Buddy's Phantom Funhouse was initially received with praise, with the work being covered in the New York Times by columnist Robert Coover. Coover described Funhouse as heralding an age in which the paperback novel is dying, with computer-based media coming swiftly to replace it. The multivocalism of the narrative and various visual formats were of particular note to this reviewer.

Another, later review of the work noted the whimsical and fun nature of the text, describing it as a whimsical jaunt through McDaid's mind. It was described as "the most ambitious hypertext yet attempted by a single author".
