= Unthought: The Power of the Cognitive Nonconscious =

2017 book

- Author: N. Katherine Hayles
- Language: English
- Subject: Posthumanism, Critical theory, PhilosophyTechnology Human consciousness
- Genre: Scholarly monograph
- Publisher: University of Chicago Press
- Publication date: 2017
- Publication place: United States
- Pages: 272
- Website: https://press.uchicago.edu/ucp/books/book/chicago/U/bo25861765.html

Unthought: The Power of the Cognitive Nonconscious is a 2017 book by N. Katherine Hayles which explores the relationship between human consciousness and technology. This work expands traditional definitions of cognition to go beyond thinking to explore non-conscious "unthought" processes. Daniel Punday in the Electronic Book Review noted that this is an important book that addresses an increasingly urgent issue.

== Book structure and organization ==
Part 1 of Unthought focuses on “non-conscious cognition,” (Hayles term), which encompasses both biological and technological cognition, expanding the concepts of cognition beyond traditional ideas to be a process that interprets information within contexts to create meaning. Chapter One provides a theoretical framework to use in considering how biological and technical cognition work together. As Sam Horner, University of Liverpool ManagementSchool, explains, "This expanded definition enables a reconsideration of cognition that is distinct from anthropocentric notions of “thinking.”

Part Two of Unthought uses the theoretical framework developed in Part One that expands cognition definitions to explain how these distributed cognitive systems work. Cognizers (biological and technological entities that engage in cognitive processes are informed by the context they are in and thus form cognitive assemblages. Hayles' exam ples of cognitive assemblages include city traffic infrastructure (ATSAC in LA), digital personal assistants, and somatic surveillance devices, technical devices that reflect externalized nonconscious cognition (e.g., Pentland’s Sociometer and van der Helm’s MeMachine).

== Argument and content ==
In her 2017 book Unthought: The Power Of The Cognitive Nonconscious, Hayles argues that it is more useful to think about cognition than about intelligence, and that cognition is something that is not unique to humans. Hayles is a posthumanist, so she does not want to divide the world into humans and nonhumans. Instead, she argues, it is more useful to think about cognizers and noncognizers. All life forms and some technologies have cognitive capabilities, by Hayles' definition of cognition, whereas a rock or a volcano does not. This allows Hayles to analyse how humans and other life forms interact with technologies and the material world to cause changes, and it provides a theoretical framework for her posthumanist view where the human is no longer seen as the centre of the world. Focusing on cognition rather than on intelligence or consciousness also allows her to analyse how technologies like artificial intelligence can have agency without necessarily being conscious.

Hayles defines cognition as "a process that interprets information within contexts that connect it with meaning", and by this definition, all life forms and some technologies have cognitive capabilities. For example, for a dog, smell is an important type of information. A dog will interpret what it smells within a context—for example, a detection dog working with customs officers at an airport might have been trained to recognise the smell of fruit or meat or certain drugs. The dog interprets the smell within the context of its training, which makes the smell meaningful to it, and it can act upon that meaning. Humans think when formulating abstract ideas or rationally working through a problem, but Hayles is more interested in nonconscious cognition. An example of nonconscious cognition for a human is the rush of adrenaline in response to a frightening situation.

Technologies can also be cognizers for Hayles. She calls this technical cognition. Following her general definition of cognition, a computer cognizes when it interprets information within a context that connects it with meaning. That does not mean that it is conscious or that it is intelligent. Another important concept in Unthought is the cognitive assemblage. This is a development of actor–network theory that emphasizes how different cognizers can share information and its processing with each other.

Stephen J. Burn summarizes this work as "...challenging routine notions of what counts as cognition." Burn explains that Hayles "is driven by pressing need to consider the ethical and practical implications of technical cognitive systems—autonomous drones, trading algorithms, surveillance technologies, and so on—that are not "fully alive" but can be "fully cognitive." Burn claims that this work "synthesizes its various sources to map out a layered model of human cognition, presses the case for increasingly urgent ethical questions; and, finally, explores the future for the humanities". Sterns summarizes Hayles's intentions in this work as "She wants us to look more closely at what and how those systems act, cognize, and think, what we do with and as them, and why".

== Translations ==
Caja Negra translated Unthought into Spanish.

== Publication history ==
The work was originally published in 2017 by the University of Chicago Press.
