= Posthuman Bodies =

Nonfiction book by J. Halberstam

- Language: English
- Publisher: Indiana University Press
- Publication date: 1995

Posthuman Bodies is a nonfiction book consisting of contributed essays from various authors. The book's editors are Judith M. Halberstam and Ira Livingston, and it was published in 1995 by the Indiana University Press.

== Synopsis ==
The book consists of thirteen texts or essays within four major units, including the introduction. Topics are organized or overlaid as theoretical, political, cultural discourses that include postcolonialism, feminism, queer theory, the arts, artifacts of film, literature, medico-systems, cyborgs, aliens, along with other topics. The four units include: Part one: 'Multiples', Part two: 'Some genders', Part three: 'Queering', and Part four: 'Terminal Bodies'.

== See also ==
- Precarious Life by Judith Butler
