= Dene Grigar =

American digital artist and scholar

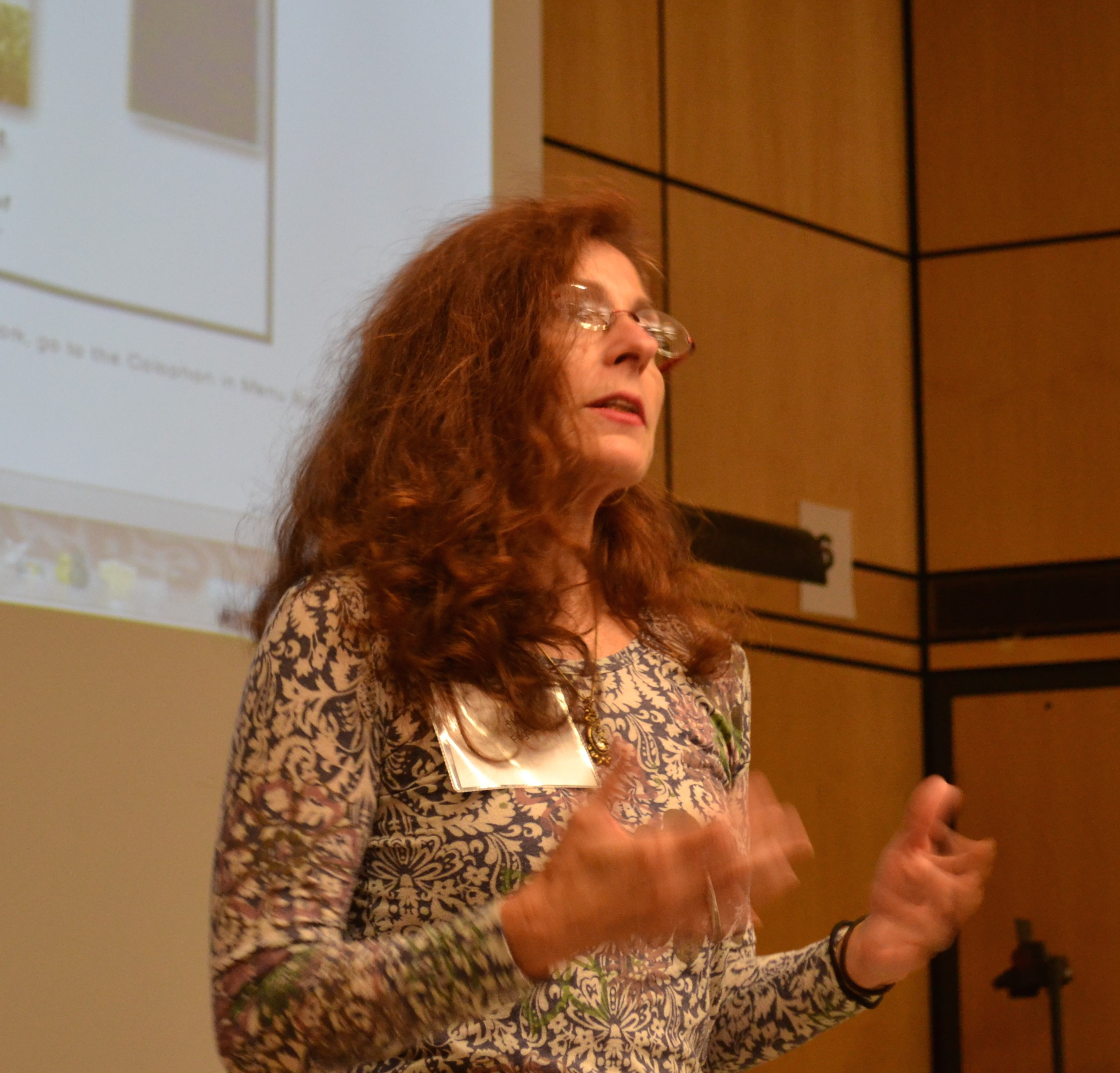
- Dene Grigar speaking during the colloquium at the Digital Humanities Summer Institute, the University of Victoria, British Columbia, June 2014.
- Occupation: Professor
- Writing career
- Genre: Electronic literature
- Subjects: The Creative Media & Digital Culture
- Notable works: Traversals: The Use of Preservation for Early Electronic Writing, Electronic Literature as Digital Humanities: Contexts, Forms, and Practices

Dene Grigar (née Rudyne) is a digital artist and scholar based in Vancouver, Washington. She was the president of the Electronic Literature Organization from 2013 to 2019. In 2016, Grigar received the International Digital Media and Arts Association's Lifetime Achievement Award. As director of the Electronic Literature Lab at Washington State University, Vancouver, Grigar collects, preserves, and analyzes digital media.

== Early life and career ==
Dene Grigar married John Barber. Her mother is from what was then Czechoslovakia.

Her interest in electronic literature began in fall 1991 when she took a graduate course with Nancy Kaplan in hypertext. She graduated from the University of Texas at Dallas with an MA in humanities in 1991 and a PhD in humanities in 1995.

Grigar is currently the professor and director of The Creative Media & Digital Culture in the Department of Digital Technology & Culture at Washington State University Vancouver.

== Scholarship ==
Grigar is professor and director of the Creative Media & Digital Culture Program at Washington State University Vancouver. Her scholarship is largely focused on electronic literature, and has appeared in journals like Computers and Composition and Technoculture. She co-authored Traversals: The Use of Preservation for Early Electronic Writing (MIT Press 2017) with Stuart Moulthrop. The book was a product of a 2013 National Endowment for the Humanities (NEH) Startup Grant. Grigar's scholarly interests can be traced back to the early 1990s, when she took a class with Nancy Kaplan.

Grigar was a member of the Kairos editorial board.

== Works ==
=== Essays ===
Grigar co edited a volume of essays, Electronic Literature as Digital Humanities: Contexts, Forms, and Practices. This work collates essays on the state of electronic literature in 2021. Source:

Grigar's essays mainly concern pedagogy and archiving aspects of electronic literature.

- Defending your life in MOOspace: A report from the electronic edge, 1997 with John Barbar (presented at the Thirteenth Computers and Writing Conference, 1997)
- Over the line, online, gender lines: Email and women in the classroom, 1999.
- On Chance and Change and the Paths on Which They Take Us, 2006
- The Jungfrau Tapes: A Conversation with Diana Slattery about The Glide Project, both published by the Iowa Review Web
- Electronic literature: Where Is It?, 2008.
- Curating Electronic Literature as Critical and Scholarly Practice, 2014
- Born digital preservation of e-lit: a live internet traversal of Sarah Smith's King of Space, 2019
- The computer is not a tool to help us do whatever we do, it is what we do, it is the medium on which we work: Dene Grigar in conversation with Piotr Marecki, 2019
- Challenges to Archiving and Documenting Born-Digital Literature: What Scholars, Archivists, and Librarians Need to Know, 2021 (Grigar's chapter in Electronic Literature as Digital Humanities: Contexts, Forms, and Practices.)

=== Electronic literature and artworks ===
Grigar has produced a number of multimodal artworks, including:

- Fallow Fields: A Story in Two Parts (2004) was published in The Iowa Review Web,
- When Ghosts Will Die, a finalist in the 2006 Drunken Boat Panliterary Awards.
- 24-Hr. Micro-Elit Project centers on a collection of 24 stories about life in an American city in the 21st century and involves 140 characters or less delivered—that is, "tweeted"—on Twitter over a 24 hr. period. Launched on Friday, August 21, 2009. The work asked for other contributions, and over 85 stories were submitted by 25+ participants from five countries in that timeframe
- Fort Vancouver Mobile project was funded by the NEH. This was a locative / mixed media effort that brings together a core team of 23 scholars, digital storytellers, new media producers, historians, and archaeologists to create location-aware nonfiction content for mobile phones to be used at the Fort Vancouver National Historic Site.
- Curlew, which was featured at the 2014 OLE.1 festival in Naples,

=== Books ===
Pathfinders: Documenting the Experience of Early Digital Literature with Stuart Moulthrop. This documents the Pathfinders project, funded by the National Endowment for Humanities, to archive and transmit Judy Malloy's Uncle Roger, John McDaid's Uncle Buddy's Phantom Funhouse, Shelley Jackson's Patchwork Girl, and Bill Bly's We Descend. This work has had more than 57,000 visits as of December 2024.

Traversals: A method of preservation for born-digital texts, with Stuart Moulthrop, 2017 (includes The Many Faces of Judy Malloy's Uncle Roger)

The Challenges of Born-Digital Fiction: Editions, Translations, and Emulations with Mariusz Pisarski, 2024 is a work that straddles both print and online multimedia aspects to explain how the Electronic Literature Lab preserved and emulated Judy Malloy’s its name was Penelope, produced on Eastgate Systems' Storyspace platform, and John McDaid’s Uncle Buddy’s Phantom Funhouse and Stuart Moultrop’s Hyperbola: A Digital Companion to Gravity’s Rainbow and Dreamtime, both created with HyperCard.

== Curations and exhibitions ==
Dene Grigar's 1997 Nouspace Gallery and Media Lounge was a MOO that "offered a place to continue thinking about what it means to live and work online and how one best interacts with and presents multimedia on the web." as Marjorie Luesebrink described in #WomenTechLit as a landmark innovation

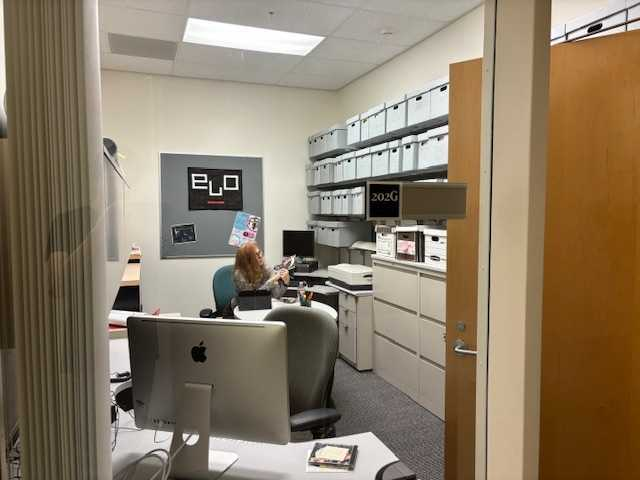
Dene Grigar examining archives at the Electronic Literature Lab Washington State University

Grigar developed The NEXT Museum, Library, and Preservation Space, housed in the Electronic Literature Lab as a digital exhibition and archival space, and has curated many exhibits.Her essays provide a history and explanation of challenges inherent in exhibiting born-digital works.

At the Modern Language Association (MLA) 2012 Convention, Dene Grigar, Lori Emerson, and Kathi Inman Barnes put on an "Electronic Literature Exhibit".

She worked with Kathi Inman Barnes to curate "Electronic Literature and Its Emerging Forms" as an exhibition in the Library of Congress in 2013. This exhibit featured 27 works of born-digital literature, accompanied by 69 print books.

Grigar has done extensive work curating exhibitions of digital art and electronic literature, including for the Library of Congress and Modern Language Association. Grigar helped lead the ELO repository in 2018. Grigar is now curating and editing the NeXt, an online digital museum and library, which presents preserved and emulated works of digital art and writing.

Grigar curated the exhibition "Hypertext & Art: A Retrospective of Forms" for the Bibliotheca Hertziana — Max Planck Institute for Art History 5-8 September 2023 and the University of Victoria's McPherson Library 10-14 June 2024.

== Grant projects ==
Grigar has successfully received and executed grants for many projects, including:

- Fort Vancouver Mobile project with Michael Rabby from the U.S. National Endowment for the Humanities (2013)
- Pathfinders Project with Stuart Moulthrop from the U.S. National Endowment for the Humanities (2013). This work documented five artists by using a Traversal to provide a reading through the work from obsolete computers.
- ELO repository to preserve works that the Electronic Literature Organization had collected from the Andrew W. Mellon Foundation.
- The Future of Text In Extended Reality with Frode Hegland from the Alfred P. Sloan Foundation (2024)

== Awards ==
Grigar won the Marjorie C. Luesebrink Career Achievement Award announced in the Electronic Literature Organization 2024 conference. In 2025, she and John Barber received the Outstanding Service Award from Washington State University.

== Electronic Literature Community ==
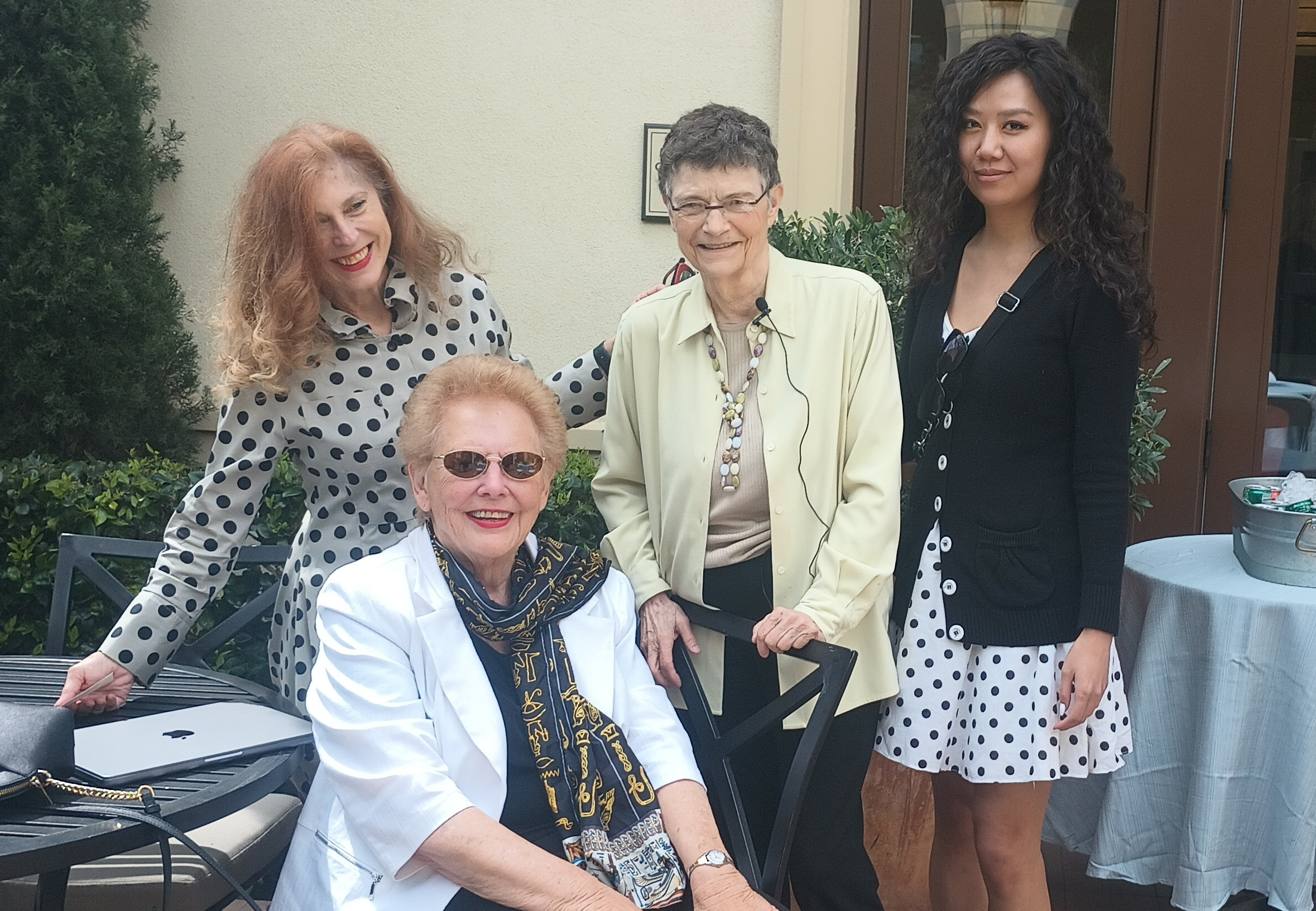
N. Katherine Hayles (sitting), Dene Grigar (left), Stephanie Strickland (center), and Lai-Tze Fan attending memorial for Marjorie Luesebrink (March 15, 2024)

Dene Grigar was president of the Electronic Literature Organization from 2013 to 2019. James O'Sullivan in his opening remarks for the 2019 ELO conference in Cork, Ireland, remarked that "there is a generation of artistic endeavour which would have been lost had it not been for Dene Grigar. But most importantly, she has overseen the rise of a new generation of scholars and practitioners who will always see her as their president."

== See also ==
- Electronic Literature Organization
- List of electronic literature authors, critics, and works
- Digital poetry
- E-book § History
- Electronic literature
- Hypertext fiction
- Interactive fiction
- Literatronica
