= Marjorie Luesebrink =

American writer, scholar, and teacher

- Born: Marjorie Coverley Luesebrink; August 4, 1943; California, United States
- Died: October 4, 2023 (aged 80)
- Writing career
- Pen name: M.D. Coverley
- Website: califia.us

Marjorie Coverley Luesebrink (August 4, 1943 – October 4, 2023) was an American writer, scholar, and teacher. Writing hypermedia fiction under the pen name M.D. Coverley, she is best known for her epic hypertext novels Califia (2000) and Egypt: The Book of Going Forth by Day (2006). A pioneer born-digital writer, she is part of the first generation of electronic literature authors that arose in the 1987–1997 period. She was a founding board member and past president of the Electronic Literature Organization and the first winner of the Electronic Literature Organization Career Achievement Award, which was named in her honor. Lusebrink was professor emeritus, School of Humanities and Languages at Irvine Valley College (IVC).

== Early life and education ==
Marjorie Coverley Luesebrink (born August 4, 1943) was the daughter of Jack Coverley and Alice Wilcox. Her father was an engineer at Lockheed Aircraft in Southern California; her mother was active in several educational and charity organizations. A fourth-generation Californian, Coverley spent much of her youth exploring Southern California history and landscapes. The family spent summers in Balboa, where she raced sailboats and surfed. In winter, they went on trips (to buy "worthless land") in the deserts. She started writing poetry and short stories at age eight.

She received her B.A. in English from the University of California, Berkeley, in 1965 and her M.F.A. in fiction from the University of California, Irvine, in 1975.

== Career ==
After graduating from UC Berkeley, Marjorie married Richard Wayne Luesebrink. They settled in Newport Beach. He practiced law, and they began a family with the birth of Eric in 1967 and Marc in 1969. Coverley began writing articles for local magazines such as Los Angeles Magazine and Orange Coast Magazine. She started her first book-length fiction, Love and the Dragonfly – a multivoiced, mixed-text work - in 1973. In the early 1970s, she returned to school in the UC Irvine Writing Program.

After graduating from the UC Irvine M.F.A. program, Coverley began teaching, first at Orange Coast College and then at the new IVC in Irvine. She bought her first computer in 1981 and began experimenting with narratives that used the affordances of electronic digital media.

=== Teacher ===
In 1979, Luesebrink began teaching full-time at IVC. She was one of the original 13 faculty members. At IVC, she started exploring the intersections between computers and writing – experimenting with computer-generated poetry and initiating a program in CompuEnglish. Later, she developed the first online courses in literature and writing for the college. These courses appeared both online and on television. She taught in the UC Irvine writing program, UC Irvine Extension, and Orange Coast College and was professor emeritus, School of Humanities and Languages, IVC.

=== Author ===
Her works incorporate text, image, animation, sound, and structure to create spatial, visual story worlds. Her career includes novels and short stories, scholarship, curating, editing, teaching, and publishing. The Marjorie C. Luesebrink Collection in The NEXT Museum has revived and maintained 27 of her works.

Coverley has published two multimedia hypertext novels, Califia (Eastgate Systems, 2000) and Egypt: The Book of Going Forth by Day (Artist’s Book, Horizon Insight, 2006), a collection of short stories, Fingerprints on Digital Glass (2002), as well as other short fiction, poetry, interviews, and articles on electronic literature and born-digital writing.

Califia is a multimedia, interactive, hypertext fiction for CD-ROM. Califia allows the reader to wander and play in the landscape of historic/magic California. It is a computer-only creation of interactive stories, photos, graphics, maps, music, and movement. It has Three Narrating Characters, Four Directions of the Compass, Star Charts, Map Case, Archives Files, 500 Megabytes, 800 Screens, 2400 Images, 30 Songs, and 500 Words.

One scholar has written of Califia that it is designed to lead the reader "to discover the lost cache of California through her wanderings within the story space". Another writer calls it "a metaphysical quest rather than a conventional mystery", noting that the central question of the treasure remains unresolved. It has been termed a classic of hypermedia, and literary critic and hypertext scholar Katherine Hayles has cited it as one of the establishing texts for electronic literature.

Egypt: The Book of Going Forth by Day is an artist’s book published by Horizon Insight. The "first edition" consists of 100 individualized copies – each one bearing a named "spell" for the owner. Thereafter, "reader" versions have been available on flash drives. Egypt is a story of death and rebirth set in both contemporary and ancient Egypt. It explores the ways in which narrative can be distributed between both text and other media, including images, music, animations, and the navigational structure and interface. Katherine Hayles writes of Egypt: The Book of Going Forth by Day (2006) that its layers "are instrumental in creating a visual/verbal/sonic narrative in which the deep past and the present, modern skepticism and ancient rituals, hieroglyphs and electronic writing merge and blend with one another.

Fingerprints on Digital Glass is a collection of short web pieces published between 1999 and 2002. It includes Afterimage, Default Lives, Tide-Land, Universal Resource Locator, Eclipse Louisiana, Endless Suburbs, Life in the Chocolate Mountains, and Fibonacci's Daughter.

Fibonacci's Daughter is a complexly plotted hypertext centered on protagonist Annabelle Thompson, who runs a business called Bet Your Life out of a California mall. The daughter of gamblers, Thompson sells insurance policies that allow people to bet on their own future prospects. Bet Your Life is both successful and controversial, leading Thompson to be accused of witchcraft (among other things), especially after two teenage clients disappear and are later found dead. The narrative of Fibonacci's Daughter is told through a number of different voices, including excerpts from news stories. Coverley originally created Fibonacci's Daughter with the trAce Archive of online writing at Nottingham Trent University in the U.K. Jane Yellowlees Douglas has suggested that Fibonacci's Daughter owes a debt to Nathaniel Hawthorne's story "Rappaccini's Daughter" in that both are meditations on all the ways that attempting to make the world more orderly can go wrong.

Afterimage is a non-linear hypertext told in the first person as the narrator finds that her biological father is actually his brother, Trevor, who was her mother's real love. As Hazel Smith describes this, the piece's many contrasting elements and a central letter from her real father to her mother that may or may not exist plays with imagination and memory. The title Afterimage alludes to the fallibility of memory. The images in this piece of typewriters and changing lights in photographs compound the ambiguity.

Endless Suburbs is a satire based on consumerism and loss. The NEXT Museum, Library, and Preservation Space has a reconstruction, termed "emulation" of this work

Coverley’s later work includes Pacific Surfliner: San Juan Capistrano (2017), Hours of the Night. (with Stephanie Strickland, 2016), The 2015 Fukushima Pinup Calendar (2014).

== Editor ==
Luesebrink worked as an editor for several publications, including The Blue Moon Review, Inflect, Riding the Meridian, and Word Circuits.

Luesebrink also directed collaborative writing projects, such as M is for Nottingham at the trAce 2002 Incubation 2 Conference in Nottingham.

== Publications and works ==
=== Collected works and papers ===
- The Marjorie C. Luesebrink Collection The NEXT: Museum, Library, and Preservation Space, Washington State University.

=== Fiction and creative ===
==== Electronic works published through physical media ====
- Egypt: The Book of Going Forth by Day Horizon Insight (2006). A media-rich and complex narrative set in contemporary Egypt that draws upon ancient mythology, it was produced with Director and published on CD-COM by the author. Access to the work involved a personal “spell” the author sent to specific readers (e.g., Deena Larsen and David Kolb) via a flash drive. 100 of these were distributed; some of these are preserved in The NEXT. Luesebrink summarizes the creation and story of this work in Narrabase.
- Califia Eastgate Systems (CD, 2000). A multivocal story that spans five generations of Californians and the quest for gold, it was produced with Toolbook and published on CD-ROM by Eastgate Systems, Inc.

==== Electronic works published on the web ====
- Pacific Surfliner: San Juan Capistrano (2017)
- Tin Towns and Other Excel Fictions (2011–20??, in progress). Discussed in Narrabase.
- Hours of the Night. With Stephanie Strickland (2016)
- "The 2015 Fukushima Pinup Calendar" (2014)
- "Califia Reimagined" (2013)
- Tarim Tapestry (2013)
- "Pyxis Byzantium" (2008)
- M is for Nottingham? (2002)
- "ii -- in the white darkness: about [the fragility of] memory]" (with Reiner Strasser, 2004)
- "Accounts of the Glass Sky". Artifacts (2002)
- Fingerprints on Digital Glass (2002)
- "Bush Towel" Bunk Magazine (2001)
- "The Errand Upon Which We Came". Cauldron and Net 3.1 (with Stephanie Strickland, 2001)
- "A L G O". PoemsThatGo (2001)
- "Tumblers, or Mother is an Irregular Verb" Riding the Meridian (2001)
- "RainFrames" Aileron (2000)
- "Negative Confessions" Poems by Nari (with Ted Warnell, 2000)
- "To Be Here as Stone Is". True North (with Stephanie Strickland, 1999)
- "Pao-Lien and the Cave Dragon, Wu". trAce MY MILLENNIUM project, Nottingham Trent University, U.K. (1999)
- "Elys, The Lacemaker" The Book of Hours of Madame de Lafayette (1997)
- "The Probability of Earthquake" excerpt from Califia, Blast 5 Project (1996)
- "Love and the Dragonfly" The Moon Instar (1992)

==== Readings ====
- "Fukushima Pinup Calendar"
  - Doheney Library, USC (2014)
  - Digital Humanities Summer Institute (2014)
  - Chicago School of Arts (2014)
- Califia
  - Hammer Museum (2007)
- "Fibonacci's Daughter"
  - Society for Literature and Science, Atlanta (2000)
- Egypt: The Book of Going Forth by Day
  - Library of Congress (2013)
  - Dartmouth Symposium (2011)
  - Kennesaw State University, Georgia (2002)
  - Beyond Hypertext at Beyond Baroque: New Electronic Poetry and Fiction (October 19, 2002)
  - Digital Arts and Culture, Brown University (2001)
- "Tin Towns"
  - Hugo House, Seattle (2012)
- "The Beauty of Loulan"
  - &Now Festival, San Diego (2011)
  - Society for Literature, Science, and the Arts (2011)

==== Exhibitions ====
- Recovery Hub of American Women Writers Project showcase: Marjorie C. Luesebrink Collection at Electronic Literature Organization's The NEXT Museum
- Horizon Insight: A Retrospective of the Art of M. D. Coverley, The NEXT
- Endless Suburbs, Hypertext & Art: A Retrospective of Forms, Bibliotheca Hertziana, Rome, Italy, September 5–8, 2023, curated by Dene Grigar
- Electronic Literature exhibition, 2012 Modern Language Association Annual Conference, Seattle, WA, Hugo House, January 5–7, 2012, curated by Dene Grigar, Kathi Inman Berens, and Lori Emerson
- Library of Congress, April 3–5, 2013, curated by Dene Grigar and Kathi Inman Berens
- Downtown Campus Library, Morgantown, WV, 20–23 June 2012
- ELO Visionary Landscapes, May 29-June 1, 2008, Washington State University at Vancouver
- Hammer Museum
- Guggenheim Museum (New York)
- The Digital Arts Center at UCLA
- Brown University
- Museum of Post-Digital Cultures (Switzerland)
- Chicago School of the Arts
- trAce
- Downtown Campus Library University of West Virginia
- Boston Lite Show (Boston Cyberarts Festival)
- Aldeburgh Poetry Festival
- Future For Word Multimedia Exhibition (Seattle Poetry Festival)

==== Documentation of works ====
- Califia traversal, interview, and images of the work

=== Nonfiction and critical ===
==== Print ====
- "Women’s Contributions to Electronic Literature 1990-2010". Women/Tech/Lit. Maria Mencia, editor.
- "The Making and Unmaking of Califia". Women/Tech/Lit. Maria Mencia, Charles Baldwin, eds. West Virginia Press (forthcoming).
- "The History of the Electronic Literature Organization". The Johns Hopkins Guide to Digital Media. Benjamin J. Robertson and Marie-Laure Ryan, eds. Johns Hopkins University Press (2014).
- "Creativity and Writing in Digital Media". (with Stephanie Strickland). Creativity and Writing Pedagogy: Linking Creative Writers, Researchers and Teachers. Harriet Levin Millan and Martha C. Pennington, eds. Equinox Press (2014).
- "Code Egyptian Blue: Crossover Platforms in Hypertext Fiction". Proceedings of the CyberMountain Colloquium—Denver, Colorado. Larsen, D. and Nürnberg, P.J., eds. (1999).
- "The Grateful Dead Legendstock". Perspectives on the Grateful Dead. Robert Weiner, ed. Greenwood Press, Fall (1999).
- "The Moment in Hypertext: A Brief Lexicon of Time". Proceedings of the Ninth ACM Conference on Hypertext and Hypermedia, SIGLINK. (1998).
- "Walk Four Ways". Co-authored with Carolyn Guyer, Peg Syverson, and Michael Joyce. Pre Text, University of Texas Austin (1997).
- "Upward, Beyond the Constant Flow, There was Moondling: Writers, Rhetoric, and Technology in Hypertext Fiction". The Elephant Ear, Spring (1996).

==== Web ====
- "One + One = Zero – Vanishing Text in Electronic Literature". Electronic book review (2014)
- "Futures of Electronic Literature" (with Stephanie Strickland). Electronic book review (2014).
- "Multi-Modal Coding: Jason Nelson, Donna Leishman, and Electronic Writing". (Guest edited edition with Stephanie Strickland). The Iowa Review Web 9.1 (2007).
- "The nEARness/t of [IrOny] U’s: An Interview with Talan Memmott on the Occasion of the Publication of Self Portrait(s) [as Other(s)]". The Iowa Review Web (2003).
- "The Mirror of Simple Annihilated Souls – Web martyrs and other issues of the electronic creative environments". Currents in Electronic Literacy (November 2001).
- "The White Wall: Re-Framing the Mirror – making the web-sccessible version of MIrro". Currents in Electronic Literature (November 2001).
- "The Personalization of Complexity – Our relationship to the complex mind of the computer". frAme 5. (February 2001).
- "An Interview with Reiner Strasser – Marjorie Luesebrink interviews the noted German artist". frAme 5. (February 2001).
- "Egyptian E-Mail – Letters to Christy Sheffield Sanford". Enterzone, episode 14. (Spring 1998)
- "The NeverEnding Fairy Tale – The Disney fantasy"—first published online in Orange Coast Magazine (1996)
- "The $500 Rolls-Royce – California urban legends"—first published online in Orange Coast Magazine (1995).
- "When the Going Gets Tough – Cybershopping – Web shopping in the beginning". First published online in Orange Coast Magazine (1995).
- "The Virtual Mausoleum – why have a plaque in the grass when you can have a mausoleum on the WWW? (archives being reconstructed)". First published online in Orange Coast Magazine (1995)

==== Presentations ====
- “The Boston T1 Party: Califia” Boston Cyberarts Festival, Boston (2001)
- “A Night at the Cybertexts: Default Lives” Digital Arts and Culture, Brown University (2001)
- Literature in Transition, NEH Workshop, UCLA (2001)
- Loyola Marymount University, Los Angeles (2001)
- Writers at Work, Irvine Valley College (2000)
- Hypertext 00 (SIGLINK, ACM), San Antonio (2000)
- Digital Center for the Arts, Evening New Media Series, UCLA (2000)
- The Transcriptions Project, USCB (2000)
- 2000 Cultural Studies Symposium, Manhattan, KS (2000)
- Electronic Literature Association, Seattle (2000)
- SW/Texas Popular Culture Association, Albuquerque (2000)
- University of New Mexico, Socorro, NM (2000)
- The U.C. Irvine Writer’s Conference (1999)
- The Cybermountain Colloquium, Denver (1999)
- Platforms for 21st Century Literature, Brown University (1999)
- Modern Language Association, San Francisco (1998)
- The U.C. Irvine Writer’s Conference (1998)
- The Squaw Valley Writer’s Conference (1998)
- Redlands University (1998)
- Women Connect Seminar, Newport Beach (1998)
- NEH Seminar in New Technologies in Literature, UCLA (1998)
- Orange Coast College, Costa Mesa, CA (1998)
- The Newport Beach Library’s Manuscript Series (1998)
- Hypertext 98 (SIGLINK, ACM), Pittsburgh, PA (1998)

=== Curated collections ===
- "Intersections: Explore". The Blue Moon Review. November 2001. Ten women working in Web literature.
- "Jumpin’ at the Diner (with Jennifer Ley)". Riding the Meridian 2.2 (2000). Forty men in hypermedia Web literature.
- "The Progressive Dinner Party" – Thirty-nine women writers in e-literature with Carolyn Guertin. Riding the Meridian (Spring 2000).
