= Donna Haraway =

American philosopher (born 1944)

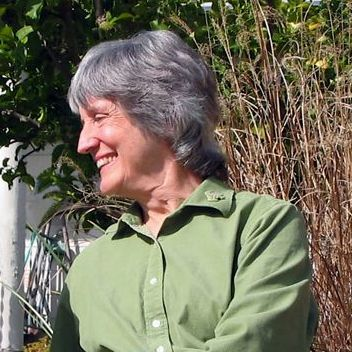
- Haraway in 2006
- Born: Donna Jeanne Haraway; September 6, 1944 (age 82); Denver, Colorado, U.S.
- Spouses: Jaye Miller (divorced); Rusten Hogness (m. 1975)
- Awards: J. D. Bernal Award, Ludwik Fleck Prize, Robert K. Merton Award, Wilbur Cross Medal

Academic background
- Education: Yale University, Colorado College
- Influences: Nancy Hartsock, Sandra Harding, G. Evelyn Hutchinson, Robert Young, Gregory Bateson

Academic work
- Discipline: Zoology, biology, science and politics, technology, feminist theory, medicine studies, animal studies, animal-human relationships
- Main interests: Feminist studies, ecofeminism, posthumanism
- Notable works: A Cyborg Manifesto, Primate Visions: Gender, Race, and Nature in the World of Modern Science, Staying with the Trouble, "Situated Knowledges: The Science Question in Feminism and the Privilege of Partial Perspective"
- Notable ideas: Cyborgs, cyborg feminism, cyborg imagery, primatology, cross species sociality

Donna Jeanne Haraway (born September 6, 1944) is an American philosopher, who contributed to the intersection of information technology and feminist theory, and is a scholar in contemporary ecofeminism. Her work criticizes anthropocentrism, emphasizes the self-organizing powers of nonhuman processes, and explores dissonant relations between those processes and cultural practices, rethinking sources of ethics.

Haraway taught women's studies and the history of science at the University of Hawaiʻi (1971–1974) and Johns Hopkins University (1974–1980). She began working as a professor at the University of California, Santa Cruz in 1980 where she became the first tenured professor in feminist theory in the United States.

Haraway's works have contributed to the study of both human–machine and human–animal relations. Her work has sparked debate in primatology, philosophy, and developmental biology. Haraway participated in a collaborative exchange with the feminist theorist Lynn Randolph from 1990 to 1996. Their engagement with specific ideas relating to feminism, technoscience, political consciousness, and other social issues, formed the images and narrative of Haraway's book Modest_Witness for which she received the Society for Social Studies of Science's (4S) Ludwik Fleck Prize in 1999. She was also awarded the American Sociological Association's Section on Science, Knowledge and Technology's Robert K. Merton Award in 1992 for her work Primate Visions: Gender, Race, and Nature in the World of Modern Science. In 2017, Haraway was awarded the Wilbur Cross Medal, one of the highest honors for alumni of Yale University. In 2021, Haraway received the Nuevo León Alfonso Reyes Prize for imagining new horizons for the fusion of science, humanities, biology, and philosophy. In 2025, she was awarded the Erasmus Prize.

== Biography ==
=== Early life ===
Donna Jeanne Haraway was born on September 6, 1944, in Denver, Colorado. Her father, Frank O. Haraway, was a sportswriter for The Denver Post. Her mother, Dorothy Mcguire Haraway, who came from an Irish Catholic background, died from a heart attack when Haraway was 16 years old. Haraway attended high school at St. Mary's Academy in Cherry Hills Village, Colorado.

Although she is no longer religious, Catholicism had a strong influence on her as she was taught by nuns in her early life. The impression of the eucharist influenced her linkage of the figurative and the material.

=== Education ===
Haraway majored in zoology, with minors in philosophy and English at Colorado College, on the full-tuition Boettcher Scholarship. After college, Haraway moved to Paris and studied evolutionary philosophy and theology at the Fondation Teilhard de Chardin on a Fulbright scholarship. She completed her Ph.D. in biology at Yale University in 1972 writing a dissertation about the use of metaphor in shaping experiments in experimental biology titled The Search for Organizing Relations: An Organismic Paradigm in Twentieth-Century Developmental Biology. Her dissertation was later edited into a book and published under the title Crystals, Fabrics, and Fields: Metaphors of Organicism in Twentieth-Century Developmental Biology.

=== Later work ===
Haraway was the recipient of several scholarships. In 1999, Haraway received the Society for Social Studies of Science's (4S) Ludwik Fleck Prize. In September 2000, Haraway was awarded the Society for Social Studies of Science's highest honor, the J. D. Bernal Award, for her "distinguished contributions" to the field. Haraway's most famous essay was published in 1985: "A Manifesto for Cyborgs: Science, Technology, and Socialist-Feminism in the 1980s" and was characterized as "an effort to build an ironic political myth faithful to feminism, socialism, and materialism".

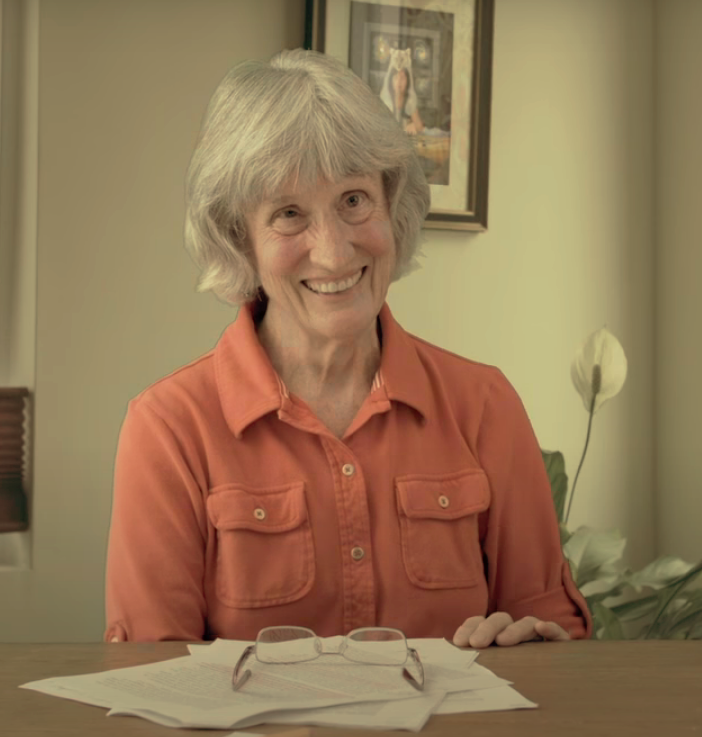
Haraway in 2016

In Haraway's thesis, "Situated Knowledges: The Science Question in Feminism and the Privilege of Partial Perspective" (1988), she means to expose the myth of scientific objectivity. Haraway defined the term "situated knowledges" as a means of understanding that all knowledge comes from positional perspectives. Our positionality inherently determines what it is possible to know about an object of interest. Comprehending situated knowledge "allows us to become answerable for what we learn how to see". Without this accountability, the implicit biases and societal stigmas of the researcher's community are twisted into ground truth from which to build assumptions and hypothesis. Haraway's ideas in "Situated Knowledges" were heavily influenced by conversations with Nancy Hartsock and other feminist philosophers and activists.

Her book Primate Visions: Gender, Race, and Nature in the World of Modern Science (1989) critically focuses on primate research through a feminist lens in order to understand how heterosexual ideology is reflected in primatology.

Currently, Haraway is an American professor emerita in the history of consciousness and feminist studies departments at the University of California, Santa Cruz, United States.

She lives north of San Francisco with her partner, Rusten Hogness.

Haraway has stated that she tries to incorporate collective thinking and all perspectives into her work: "I notice if I have cited nothing but white people, if I have erased indigenous people, if I forget non-human beings, etc. ... You know, I run through some old-fashioned, klutzy categories. Race, sex, class, region, sexuality, gender, species ... I know how fraught all those categories are, but I think those categories still do important work."

== Philosophy ==
=== "A Cyborg Manifesto" ===
In 1985, Haraway published the essay "A Manifesto for Cyborgs: Science, Technology, and Socialist Feminism in the 1980s" in Socialist Review. Although most of Haraway's earlier work was focused on emphasizing the masculine bias in scientific culture, she has also contributed greatly to the feminist narratives of the twentieth century. For Haraway, the Manifesto offered a response to the rising conservatism during the 1980s in the United States at a critical juncture at which feminists, to have any real-world significance, had to acknowledge their situatedness within what she terms the "informatics of domination." Women were no longer on the outside along a hierarchy of privileged binaries but rather deeply imbued, exploited by and complicit within networked hegemony, and had to form their politics as such.

=== Cyborg feminism ===
In her updated essay "A Cyborg Manifesto: Science, Technology, and Socialist-Feminism in the Late Twentieth Century", in her book Simians, Cyborgs and Women: The Reinvention of Nature (1991), Haraway uses the cyborg metaphor to explain how fundamental contradictions in feminist theory and identity should be conjoined, rather than resolved, similar to the fusion of machine and organism in cyborgs. The manifesto is also an important feminist critique of capitalism by revealing how men have exploited women's reproduction labor, providing a barrier for women to reach full equality in the labor market. She later discussed her thoughts on A Cyborg Manifesto, gender and 'post-gender' in 2006, critiquing distinct and imposed categories; "people are made to live several non-isomorphic categories simultaneously, all of which torque them".

=== Primate Visions ===
Haraway also writes about the history of science and biology. In Primate Visions: Gender, Race, and Nature in the World of Modern Science (1990), she focused on the metaphors and narratives that direct the science of primatology. She asserted that there is a tendency to masculinize the stories about "reproductive competition and sex between aggressive males and receptive females [that] facilitate some and preclude other types of conclusions". She contended that female primatologists focus on different observations that require more communication and basic survival activities, offering very different perspectives of the origins of nature and culture than the currently accepted ones. Drawing on examples of Western narratives and ideologies of gender, race and class, Haraway questioned the most fundamental constructions of scientific human nature stories based on primates. In Primate Visions, she wrote:

My hope has been that the always oblique and sometimes perverse focusing would facilitate revisions of fundamental, persistent western narratives about difference, especially racial and sexual difference; about reproduction, especially in terms of the multiplicities of generators and offspring; and about survival, especially about survival imagined in the boundary conditions of both the origins and ends of history, as told within western traditions of that complex genre.

Haraway's aim for science is "to reveal the limits and impossibility of its 'objectivity' and to consider some recent revisions offered by feminist primatologists". Haraway presents an alternative perspective to the accepted ideologies that continue to shape the way scientific human nature stories are created. Haraway urges feminists to be more involved in the world of technoscience and to be credited for that involvement. In a 1997 publication, she remarked:

I want feminists to be enrolled more tightly in the meaning-making processes of technoscientific world-building. I also want feminist—activists, cultural producers, scientists, engineers, and scholars (all overlapping categories) — to be recognized for the articulations and enrollment we have been making all along within technoscience, in spite of the ignorance of most "mainstream" scholars in their characterization (or lack of characterizations) of feminism in relation to both technoscientific practice and technoscience studies.

=== Make Kin not Population: Reconceiving Generations ===
Haraway created a panel called "Make Kin not Babies" in 2015 with five other feminist thinkers. The panel's emphasis was on moving human numbers down while paying attention to factors, such as the environment, race, and class. A key phrase of Haraway's is "Making babies is different than giving babies a good childhood." She and another panelist, Adele Clarke, later published the corresponding book Making Kin not Population: Reconceiving Generations.

=== Speculative fabulation ===
Speculative fabulation is a concept that is included in many of Haraway's works. It includes all of the wild facts that will not hold still, and it indicates a mode of creativity and the story of the Anthropocene. Haraway stresses how this does not mean it is not a fact. In Staying with the Trouble, she defines speculative fabulation as "a mode of attention, theory of history, and a practice of worlding," and she finds it an integral part of scholarly writing and everyday life. In Haraway's work she addresses a feminist speculative fabulation and its focusing on making kin instead of babies to ensure the good childhood of all children while controlling the population. Making Kin not Population: Reconceiving Generations highlights practices and proposals to implement this theory in society.

=== The Companion Species Manifesto: Dogs, People, and Significant Otherness ===
The companion Species Manifesto is to be read as a “personal document”. This work was written to tell the story of cohabitation, coevolution and embodied cross-species sociality. Haraway argues that humans 'companion' relationship with dogs can show us the importance of recognizing differences and ‘how to engage with significant otherness'. The link between humans and animals like dogs can show people how to interact with other humans and nonhumans. Haraway believes that we should be using the term "companion species" instead of "companion animals" because of the relationships we can learn through them.

=== Reception ===
Haraway's work has been criticized for being "methodologically vague" and using noticeably opaque language that is "sometimes concealing in an apparently deliberate way". A 1991 review of Haraway's Primate Visions, published in the International Journal of Primatology, provides some of the most common criticisms of her view of science, and a 1990 review in the American Journal of Primatology offers a similarly dismissive commentary, with both reviews arguing that her understanding of the scientific method is questionable, and that her explorations of epistemology at times leave her texts virtually meaning-free.

In reviewing the book for the Journal of the History of Biology, sexologist Anne Fausto-Sterling, who has written extensively on the social construction of gender, sexual identity, gender identity, gender roles, and intersexuality, wrote that the book is "important," though she wished it "were easier to read."

In 2017, ArtReview named Haraway the third most influential person in the contemporary art world, stating that her work "has become part of the art world’s DNA".

== Works ==
- When We Have Never Been Human, What Is to Be Done? Interview with Donna Haraway, Nicholas Gane: Theory, Culture and Society, 2006. Volume 23 (7–8), pages 135-158. When We Have Never Been Human, What Is to Be Done?: Interview with Donna Haraway
- Crystals, Fabrics, and Fields: Metaphors of Organicism in Twentieth-Century Developmental Biology, New Haven: Yale University Press, 1976. ISBN 978-0-300-01864-6
- Primate Visions: Gender, Race, and Nature in the World of Modern Science, Routledge: New York and London, 1989. ISBN 978-0-415-90294-6
- Simians, Cyborgs and Women: The Reinvention of Nature, New York: Routledge, and London: Free Association Books, 1991 (includes "A Cyborg Manifesto"). ISBN 978-0-415-90387-5
- Modest_Witness@Second_Millennium.FemaleMan©Meets_OncoMouse™: Feminism and Technoscience, New York: Routledge, 1997 (winner of the Ludwik Fleck Prize). ISBN 0-415-91245-8
- How Like a Leaf: A Conversation with Donna J. Haraway, Thyrza Nichols Goodeve, New York: Routledge, 1999. ISBN 978-0-415-92402-3
- The Companion Species Manifesto: Dogs, People, and Significant Otherness, Chicago: Prickly Paradigm Press, 2003. ISBN 0-9717575-8-5
- When Species Meet, Minneapolis: University of Minnesota Press, 2007. ISBN 0-8166-5045-4
- The Haraway Reader, New York: Routledge, 2004, ISBN 0415966892.
- Staying with the Trouble: Making Kin in the Chthulucene, Durham: Duke University Press, 2016. ISBN 978-0-8223-6224-1
- Manifestly Haraway, Minneapolis: University of Minnesota Press, 2016. ISBN 978-0816650484
- Staying with the Trouble: Making Kin in the Chthulucene, Duke University Press, Durham, North Carolina, 2016. ISBN 978-0-8223-6224-1 doi:10.1215/9780822373780
- Making Kin not Population: Reconceiving Generations, Donna J. Haraway and Adele Clarke, Chicago: Prickly Paradigm Press, 2018. ISBN 9780996635561.

== See also ==
- Cyborg anthropology
- Postgenderism
- Postmodernism
- New materialism
- Sandy Stone
- Techno-progressivism
- Feminist technoscience
- Judith Butler
- N. Katherine Hayles
