= Precarious Life =

2004 book by Judith Butler

Precarious Life: The Powers of Mourning and Violence
- 2004 book cover
- Author: Judith Butler
- Subject: Post 9/11, Grief, Mourning, and Violence
- Set in: United States, Afghanistan, and Iraq
- Published: 2004
- Publisher: Verso Books
- Publication place: United Kingdom and United States
- Media type: Print, E-book
- Pages: 168
- ISBN: 9781844670055 9781844675449
- OCLC: 53398140
- Website: Official website

Precarious Life: The Powers of Mourning and Violence is a 2004 nonfiction book by Judith Butler. It was published by Verso Books, London.

== Synopsis ==
In this book, five essays that are written by Butler address the increased vulnerability and aggression that arose after September 11, 2001. These writings explore themes such as: Interpretation and justification; violence, bereavement, and political engagement; indefinite imprisonment; accusations of antisemitism; a commitment to nonviolence founded on the recognition of the fragility of human life.

== See also ==
- Posthuman Bodies by Judith M. Halberstam and Ira Livingston
