= N. Katherine Hayles =

American literary critic (born 1943)

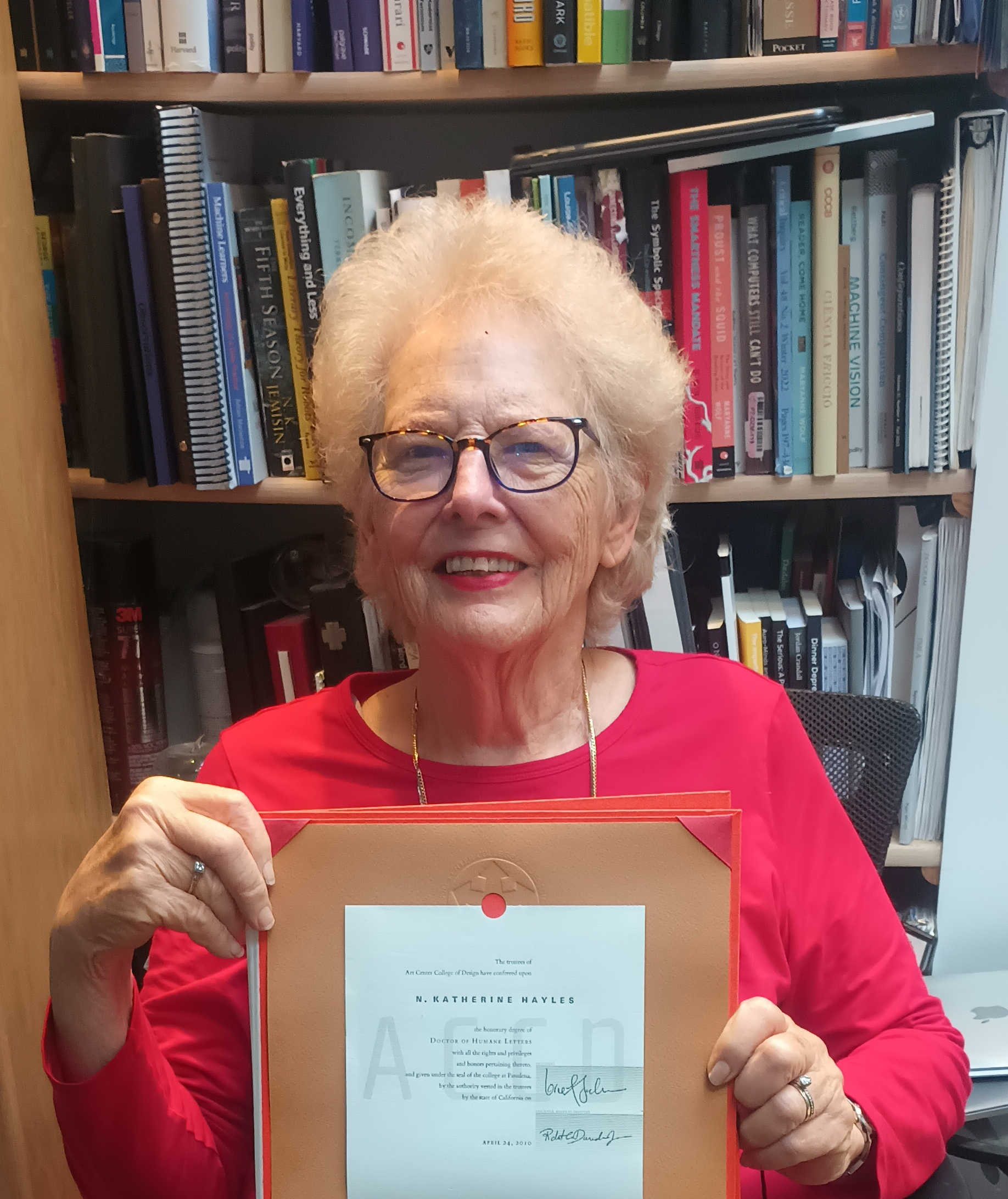
- Katherine Hayles holding up an honorary diploma
- Born: 1943 (age 82–83); St. Louis, Missouri, U.S.
- Other names: Kate, Katherine Hayles
- Occupation: Professor
- Years active: 1970-present
- Known for: Critical theory for relationships between literature, cognition, and technology
- Board member of: Modern Language Association, Electronic Literature Organization, Society for Literature and Science
- Awards: American Academy of Arts and Sciences and Academy of Europe member; René Wellek Prize,

Academic background
- Education: BS, chemistry, Rochester Institute of Technology (1966); MS chemistry, California Institute of Technology (1969); MA English Literature, Michigan State University, PhD English literature, University of Rochester (1977)

Academic work
- Discipline: Literature
- Sub-discipline: Electronic literature American postmodern literature
- Institutions: University of Iowa, UCLA, Duke
- Main interests: Social and literary critic, specializing in relations between science, literature, and technology
- Notable works: How We Became Posthuman (1999), Writing Machines (2002), How We Think (2012), Unthought (2017), Bacteria to AI (2025)

Nancy Katherine Hayles (born 1943) is an American scholar who focuses on the interconnections "between science, literature, and technology". Originally a research chemist in the 1960s, she then earned her doctorate in English literature and became a distinguished professor. In the humanities, her work, How We Became Posthuman (1999) is a seminal foundation for posthumanism. In literary criticism, she is most notable for her contribution to the fields of literature and science, particularly American literature. Throughout her work, (from the 1970s through 2025), Hayles has examined how humans interact with technology and media. She explores how digital technologies affect humanities research. As one of the early and leading scholars of electronic literature, Hayles introduced digital literature concepts to a generation of scholars and writers (such as M.D. Coverley and Stephanie Strickland) in the 1990s through her courses for the National Endowment of Humanities.

Hayles was elected a member of the American Academy of Arts and Sciences in 2015 and elected to the Academy of Europe the same year. As of March 2025, she is a Distinguished Research Professor at the University of California, Los Angeles and the James B. Duke Professor Emerita from Duke University.

== Life and education ==
Hayles was born in Saint Louis, Missouri to Edward and Thelma Bruns.

She received her Bachelor of Science in chemistry from Rochester Institute of Technology in 1966, followed by a Master's of Science degree (M.S.) in chemistry from the California Institute of Technology in 1969. She worked as a research chemist in 1966 at the Xerox Corporation and as a chemical research consultant Beckman Instrument Company from 1968 to 1970.

Hayles then switched fields and received her Master's of Arts (MA) degree in English literature from Michigan State University in 1970, and her Doctor of Philosophy (PhD) in English literature from the University of Rochester in 1977.

She married William Hayles, July 26, 1969 (marriage ended, 1979) and had two children: Lynn Hayles Rathjen and Jonathan Hayles. She later married Nicholas Gessler, August 6, 1994.

== Career ==
After earning her PhD, Hayles taught as an instructor at Dartmouth College (1975–76) and then as an assistant professor of English (1976–1982). Afterwards, she moved to the University of Missouri–Rolla, as an assistant professor of English (1982–85) and from there to the University of Iowa, where she taught as an associate professor, (1985–89) and as the Millington F. Carpenter Professor of English (1989–92). Hayles then became the Hillis Professor of Literature in English and Media Arts at the University of California, Los Angeles (UCLA) (1992–2008). After this distinguished professorship, she moved to Duke University and was a professor of English and Literature at (1992–2018), when she retired as the James B. Duke Distinguished Professor Emerita of Literature. She then returned to UCLA, where she has held an appointment as Distinguished Research Professor of English from 2018.

In addition to her faculty positions, Hayles has been a visiting scholar at several prestigious academic institutions, including the California Institute of Technology, Pasadena where she served as a visiting associate (1979–80) and a visiting associate professor (1988), and at Tulane University, New Orleans, where she was the Mellon Distinguished Visiting Professor (1994).

Hayles has also been an active executive in multiple boards, including her work as a member of the executive committee, Literature and Science Division, (1988–92); and chair of prize committee (1997) for the Modern Language Association of America; President for the Society for Literature and Science (1991–93). She was the faculty director of the Electronic Literature Organization from 2001 to 2006. Since then, Hayles has served on the Electronic Literature Organization's Literary Advisory Board.

Hayles has delivered multiple keynotes, including the HCAS Fellows Symposium for the University of Helsinki in Spring 2019.

== Major works ==
=== How We Became Posthuman ===
This seminal book explains how the lines between human and technology are blurring. Hayles traces the history of cybernetics and technology, helping to define and introduce the term "posthuman."

=== Writing Machines ===
This 2002 work explores the literary dimensions of new media. This work introduces "first-, second- and third-generations hypertexts, or technotexts" as Hayles terms them. Grigar quotes Hayles to summarize that "thus, Writing Machines is not just about electronic texts produced in these days of post-humanity, but also 'what the print book can be in the digital age'". Hayles argues that cyberculture should "help us rethink the relationships between form and content, more specifically between the material aspects of the medium used and the generated content". Symons claims that "Hayles argues that a text's instantiation in a particular medium shapes it in ways that cannot be divorced from the meaning of its "words (and other semiotic components)". This print book itself is designed as a technotext. As Koskimaa described in Electronic Book Review, "Writing Machines is the second release in The MIT Press's new Mediawork Pamphlet Series, which pairs leading writers and contemporary designers to produce pamphlets involving emergent technologies that are accompanied by exclusive WebTakes". Most of the footnotes for this work were not in the actual book but were online as a WebTake.

=== How We Think ===
Her 2012 work How We Think: Digital Media and Contemporary Technogenesis, is concerned with how digital media is accepted in academia, particularly the humanities and social sciences. As Jenell Johnson, professor of the Rhetoric, Politics, and Culture program at the University of Wisconsin–Madison, describes, "It is at once an account of the theoretical and technical development of the digital humanities, an argument for its symbiotic relationship to traditional, print-based scholarship, and a demonstration of how its analytical affordances can help us to think differently about texts, as well as the scholars who seek to interpret them". Joseph Lloyd Donica, a professor of English at Bronx Community College, City University of New York, with numerous publications in his field, writes describing how "Hayles states that her book 'explores the proposition that we think through, with, and alongside media'". He goes on to note that Hayles discusses "the implications [emphasis mine] of media upheavals within the humanities and qualitative social sciences as traditionally print-based disciplines such as literature, history, philosophy, religion, and art history move into digital media". In this work, Hayles extrapolates "technogenesis" as we move from the age of print to digital. Christoph Raetzsch notes that "How We Think is organized around the term technogenesis, by which Hayles means "the idea that humans and technics have coevolved together" Donica quotes Hayles as claiming that "the ability to access and retrieve information on a global scale has a significant impact on how one thinks about one's place in the world".

As Robert Schaefer explained in his New York Journal of Books review, Hayles postulates that there are two mistaken reactions to digital media in academia: No big deal or outright rejection and calls to "initiate a new branch of academic inquiry: comparative media studies". Hayles advocates for two strategies: assimilating digital scholarship into existing pedagogy and distinguishing digital scholarship that "emphasizes new methodologies" and "research questions."

=== Unthought ===
This 2017 book Unthought: The Power Of The Cognitive Nonconscious explores relationships between human cognition and technology.

=== Bacteria to AI ===
This 2025 book examines cognition in the modern world where AI and media and humanity are merging. This work further develops Hayles integrated cognitive framework, exploring meaning-making practices from non-human perspectives, from bacteria to AI, and including plants and animals.

== Overall theories ==
Hayles's work is concerned with the interface of changing technologies and traditional culture, as Christoph Raetzsch, a post-doctoral scholar in media and communication studies, explains: "Since the 1970s, N. Katherine Hayles has been exploring the zones of contact between the cultural formations of technology and the technological basis of culture". Sherryl Vint further explains these interstices from Hayles background in both chemistry and literature as Hayles has "always been concerned with combining the two cultures of the sciences and the humanities".

=== Materiality of information ===
The structure of the printed book, Writing Machines itself as an artist book, or "technotext" embodies Hayles's contention that how we receive information determines our thinking about the information, as Jan Baetens explains: "material structure which not only helps us to think and write, but which determines our thinking and writing in every possible way". Baetens is Emeritus Professor of Cultural Studies at KU Leuven, known for his interdisciplinary work in word-and-image studies. He notes that "Maybe the most interesting thing about Writing Machines, however, is its 'ars poetica' dimension, that is the fact that the book not only says what it does, but also does what it says".

In terms of the strength of Hayles's arguments regarding the return of materiality to information, several scholars expressed doubt on the validity of the provided grounds, notably evolutionary psychology. Keating claims that while Hayles is following evolutionary psychological arguments in order to argue for the overcoming of the disembodiment of knowledge, she provides "no good reason to support this proposition". Brigham describes Hayles's attempt to connect autopoietic circularity to "an inadequacy in Maturana's attempt to account for evolutionary change" as unjustified. Weiss suggests that she makes the mistake of "adhering too closely to the realist, objectivist discourse of the sciences", the same mistake she criticizes Weiner and Maturana for committing.

=== Cognition ===
Hayles is concerned with cognition, as Punday quotes Hayles "She offers this definition: 'Cognition is a process that interprets information within contexts that connect it with meaning.'" In How We Think, Hayles "argued for connections between cognition, technology, humanity, and evolution". Hayles distinguishes between cognizers (e.g., living thinking beings and some computational media) and non-cognizers or material processes (e.g., mountains eroding). As Punday goes on to quote "Hayles distinguish[es] between what she calls cognizers and noncognizers ... [a]s she explains, "The crucial distinguishing characteristics of cognition that separate it from these underlying processes are choice and decision, and thus possibilities for interpretation and meaning. A glacier, for example, cannot choose whether to slide into a shady valley as opposed to a sunny plain".

=== Embodiment ===
As scholar Jessica Santone relates about Hayles's 1996 article, "Embodied Virtuality: Or How to Put Bodies Back into the Picture" in the book Immersed in Technology: Art and Virtual Environments, "N. Katherine Hayles succinctly situates the relationship between discourse and practice in the making and erasing of virtual bodies." Sherryl Vint explains that Hayles "pushes literary studies toward a greater engagement with the material ways that science and technology shape conceptions of the world and hence our interactions with it and ourselves". In 2021, Hayles explained in an interview that "artificial cognizers are vastly different than humans [...] I think is extremely important are the differences in embodiment. And sometimes, people speak of AI as though these cognizers don't have bodies. But of course, they all have bodies, it's impossible to exist without having a body. It's just that they're embodied in radically different forms than humans are, which lead to many misunderstandings, misrepresentations and misalliances." As Zachary Braiterman, explains, Hayles further developed her ideas of differences in How We Became Posthuman, as he quotes Hayles to summarize these differences "There are just too many differences in the types of embodiment that distinguish aware and self-aware human intelligence from the intelligent machines, no matter how tight the symbiotic relations between them. We remain human-all-too-human."

== Awards and honors ==
Hayles received the René Wellek Prize for How We Became Posthuman, awarded for the best book in the field of comparative literature, from the American Comparative Literature Association in 2000. Writing Machines won the 2003 Susanne Langer Award for Outstanding Scholarship in the Ecology of Symbolic Form presented by the Media Ecology Association (MEA).

Other awards that Hayles has received include the Electronic Literature Organization's Marjorie Luesebrink Career Achievement Award in 2018, the SFRA Award for Lifetime Contributions to SF Scholarship in 2013, and the Distinguished Scholar Award from the International Association for the Fantastic in the Arts in 1997.

She was elected a member of the American Academy of Arts and Sciences in 2015 and elected to the Academy of Europe. Hayles was inducted into the Innovation Hall of Fame at Rochester Institute of Technology's Simone Center for Innovation and Entrepreneurship in 2010. She received honorary doctorates from the Faculty of Arts at Umea University in Sweden (2007), the Art College of Design in Pasadena, CA (2010), and the Royal College of Arts (2024). She was also named a Distinguished Scholar by her alma mater, the University of Rochester. Hayles was named a Guggenheim Fellow in 1991. She received an Honorary Doctor of Letters degree from Rochester Institute of Technology in 2026.

== Electronic literature influences ==
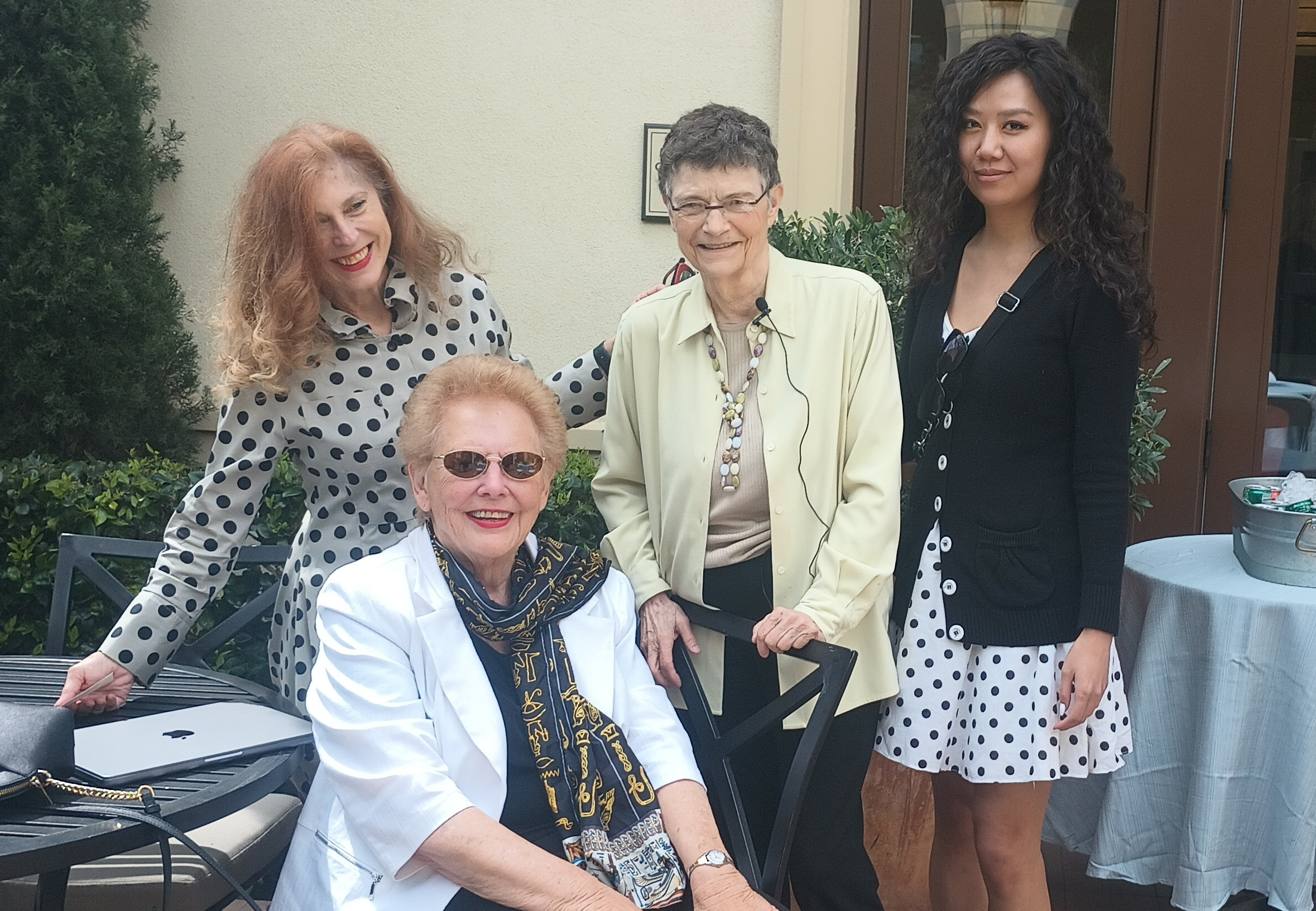
Hayles (sitting), Dene Grigar, Stephanie Strickland, and Lai-Tze Fan attending memorial for Marjorie Luesebrink (M.D. Coverley) on March 15, 2024.

As an early electronic literature scholar, Hayles has been instrumental in the electronic literature community. In 2018, Hayles herself received the Electronic Literature Organization's (ELO) Marjorie Luesebrink Career Achievement Award, acknowledging her contributions to the field. In 1995, she directed the first of three NEH Summer Seminars for electronic literature. She co-curated the first Electronic Literature Collection. Her keynote at the 2002 Electronic Literature State of the Arts Symposium at UCLA introduced the concept of providing a history of electronic literature. Her 2008 book, Electronic Literature: New Horizons for the Literary, work surveyed the field, demonstrating this new field's importance and range for literary study. Hayles divides this field into "classical" (pre-web 1990s hypertexts) and "postmodern" (web based).

In honor of Hayles's achievements, ELO has presented an annual award since 2014 for literary criticism "The N. Katherine Hayles Award for Criticism of Electronic Literature". Recipients include Joseph Tabbi for the Bloomsbury Handbook of Electronic Literature (2018), Scott Rettberg for Electronic Literature (2019), Jessica Pressman for Bookishness (2021), and Lai-Tze Fan for Critical Making, Critical Design (2022).

== Selected works ==
Hayles's work is collected in The NEXT Museum, a digital preservation space.

=== Books ===
- Hayles, N. Katherine (2025). Bacteria to AI: Human Futures with our Nonhuman Symbionts. Chicago: The University of Chicago Press. ISBN 9780226835983.
- Hayles, N. Katherine (2020). Postprint: Books And Becoming Computational. New York: Columbia University Press. ISBN 9780231198240.
- Hayles, N. Katherine (2017). Unthought: The Power Of The Cognitive Nonconscious. Chicago: The University of Chicago Press. ISBN 978-0226447889.
- Hayles, N. Katherine (2012). How We Think: Digital Media and Contemporary Technogenesis. Chicago: The University of Chicago Press. ISBN 9780226321424.
- Hayles, N. Katherine (2008). Electronic Literature: New Horizons for the Literary. South Bend: University of Notre Dame Press. ISBN 9780268030858.
- Hayles, N. Katherine (2005). My Mother Was a Computer: Digital Subjects and Literary Texts. Chicago: The University of Chicago Press. ISBN 9780226321479.
- Hayles, N. Katherine, ed. (2004). Nanoculture: Implications of the New Technoscience.
- Hayles, N. Katherine (2002). Writing Machines. Cambridge: The MIT Press. ISBN 9780262582155.
- Hayles, N. Katherine (1999). How We Became Posthuman: Virtual Bodies in Cybernetics, Literature and Informatics. Chicago: The University of Chicago Press. ISBN 9780226321462.
- Technocriticism and Hypernarrative. A special issue of Modern Fiction Studies 43, no. 3, Fall 1997 (guest editor)
- Hayles, N. Katherine, ed. (1991). Chaos and Order: Complex Dynamics in Literature and Science. Chicago: The University of Chicago Press. ISBN 9780226321448.
- Hayles, N. Katherine (1990). Chaos Bound: Orderly Disorder in Contemporary Literature and Science. Ithaca, New York: Cornell University Press. ISBN 9780801497018.
- Hayles, N. Katherine (1984). The Cosmic Web: Scientific Field Models and Literary Strategies in the Twentieth Century. Ithaca, New York: Cornell University Press. ISBN 9780801492907.

== See also ==
- Cybernetics
- Donna Haraway
- Electronic literature
