= Walter Harding =

Walter Harding (1917–1996) was a distinguished professor of English at the State University of New York at Geneseo and internationally recognized scholar of the life and work of Henry David Thoreau. Harding was born in Bridgewater, Massachusetts, and received his B.S. from Bridgewater State College in 1939, M.A. from the University of North Carolina in 1947 and a Ph.D. from Rutgers University in 1950.

== Career ==
Harding spent most of his career at SUNY Geneseo, where he arrived in 1956, although he previously taught at the University of Virginia, Rutgers University, and the University of North Carolina. He served as the chair of Geneseo's English Department for six years and was awarded several of SUNY's highest honors. He became a University Professor in 1966 and Distinguished Professor in 1973. In 1983, one year after his retirement, he became the first SUNY faculty member to be granted an honorary doctorate from SUNY itself.

== Scholarship ==
Harding authored more than twenty-five books and many articles on Thoreau and his circle. Harding's biography of Thoreau, The Days of Henry David Thoreau, is considered a definitive study of Thoreau's life. Harding also edited an edition of Thoreau's Walden that restores Thoreau's sketches to the text and includes copious footnotes. Harding helped to found the Thoreau Society, serving as the society's first secretary. He also served as president of the group. During his career Harding amassed the largest and most comprehensive research collection of Thoreauviana. The extensive collection of more than 15,000 books, pamphlets, articles and other Thoreau memorabilia was donated to the Thoreau Society and is housed at the Walden Woods Project's Thoreau Institute Library in Lincoln, Massachusetts. The Milne Library at SUNY Geneseo also has copies of some items in the Harding collection.

== Legacy ==
In addition to the research collection that bears his name, Harding's impact on Thoreau scholarship and SUNY Geneseo is registered in several ways. Harding's wife, Marjorie Brook Harding, endowed an annual lecture at SUNY Geneseo in his name. Each fall, the Walter Harding Lecture brings a distinguished scholar of American literature related to Thoreau and his circle of transcendentalists to the campus. In 2009, Mrs. Harding increased the annual lecture's endowment. Geneseo's English Department holds meetings, special events, and lectures in the Walter Harding Room of Welles Hall, and the department annually awards the Walter Harding American Studies Award to a graduating senior in the American studies program. After his death, a book of essays was published in his memory: Thoreau Among Others: Essays In Honor of Walter Harding.

=== Walter Harding Lecturers ===
- 2004: Joel Myerson Distinguished Professor of American Literature at University of South Carolina. "Not Instruction, But Provocation: Ralph Waldo Emerson on the Pursuit of Knowledge."
- 2005: Ronald A. Bosco, Distinguished University Professor of English and American Literature at SUNY Albany. "I came near awakening this morning: The Days of Emerson and Thoreau at Walden."
- 2006: Ed Folsom, Carver Professor of American Literature at the University of Iowa. "Walt Whitman's 1855 Leaves of Grass: Think Again."
- 2007: Betsy Erkkila, Henry Sanborn Noyes Professor of Literature at Northwestern University. "Romancing the Revolution: Jefferson's Declaration"
- 2008: Frances Smith Foster, Charles Howard Candler Professor of English and Women's Studies at Emory University. "'Freedom's Journal' and its Work; or Facts, Falsehoods and Common Sense."
- 2009: Michael Warner, Seymour H. Knox Professor of English, Professor of American Studies, Yale University. "The Evangelical Black Atlantic."
- 2010: Caleb Crain, independent scholar, author of American Sympathy: Men, Friendship and Literature in the New Nation, the novella Sweet Grafton, and articles in The New Yorker, The Nation, The New York Times Magazine and The New York Review of Books. "Melville's Secrets."
- 2011: Martha Nell Smith, Professor of English, Distinguished Scholar-Teacher, University of Maryland. Executive Editor, Dickinson Electronic Archives. "Digital Forensics and Texting Emily Dickinson."
- 2012: Megan Marshall, author of The Peabody Sisters: Three Women Who Ignited American Romanticism and Margaret Fuller: A New American Life.
- 2013: Laura Dassow Walls, William P. and Hazel B. White Professor of English at the University of Notre Dame.
