= Electronic Literature Organization =

- Formation: 1999; 27 years ago
- Founder: Scott Rettberg, Robert Coover, Jeff Ballowe
- President: Anastasia Salter
- Vice President: N/A
- Treasurer: Dene Grigar
- Managing Director of CELL: Davin Heckman
- Website: https://eliterature.org/

The Electronic Literature Organization (ELO) is a nonprofit organization "established in 1999 to promote and facilitate the writing, publishing, and reading of electronic literature". It hosts annual conferences, awards annual prizes for works of and criticism of electronic literature, hosts online events and has published a series of collections of electronic literature.

== History ==
=== Founding and early years (1999-2002) ===
The ELO was founded in 1999 in Chicago by Scott Rettberg, Robert Coover, and Jeff Ballowe. Rettberg took the role as CEO, and Ballowe was president. In a book chapter about this early phase, Rettberg describes the first three years as a "turbulent and exciting period".

An article in the Los Angeles Times describes the first reading organised by the ELO in July 2000, "a recent evening at the home of Microsoft executive Richard Bangs", with "trays of light finger food and delicately chilled Chardonnay" with "guests from high-tech east side Seattle mingled with representatives of the old-guard arts establishment and half a dozen writers of new fiction who had come to read from their work".

The new organization was able to ride the excitement of the tech industry during the dot-com bubble, but also suffered from the subsequent crash.

=== Transition to academic hosts (2002-2008) ===
The ELO had early successes in obtaining funding from individuals in the technology industry and the Ford Foundation (which funded the Electronic Literature Symposium at UCLA in 2002) and the Rockefeller Foundation (which funded work on the Electronic Literature Directory). However, the dot com crash made funding dry up, and despite some local funding in Chicago, the organization had to transition from having full-time staff and an office to being hosted by universities. In 2001 the ELO moved to UCLA, supported by the English department. Marjorie Luesebrink became president, N. Katherine Hayles was faculty advisor, and Jessica Pressman was the managing director. The organization has since been hosted by universities, including the University of Maryland, College Park in 2006 where it was supported by the Maryland Institute for Technology in the Humanities (under the direction of Matthew Kirschenbaum), and MIT under the leadership of Nick Montfort. The ELO is currently hosted at York University, Toronto, Canada, under the leadership of Caitlin Fisher, marking the first time this international organization has moved its headquarters outside of the United States.

=== 2008-present ===
Since the 2007 conference, the ELO has grown annually and by 2015 was gathering hundreds of people at each of its conferences.

== Leadership ==
Past presidents of the ELO include Jeff Ballowe, Scott Rettberg (as Executive Director), Marjorie Luesebrink, Matthew Kirschenbaum, Joseph Tabbi, Nick Montfort, Dene Grigar, and Leonardo Flores. Caitlin Fisher became president in July 2022.

The Literary Advisory Board includes many writers and critics such as Carolina Gainza.

== Conferences ==
The ELO holds annual conferences that include both scholarly presentations and exhibitions and performances of electronic literature. The ELO website contains an archive of past conference websites.

ELO Conferences
Year	Theme	Location
2002	State of the Arts Symposium	Los Angeles, California
2007	The Future of Electronic Literature	College Park, Maryland
2008	Visionary Landscapes	Vancouver, Washington
2010	ELO_AI: Archive & Innovate	Providence, Rhode Island
2012	Electrifying Literature: Affordances and Constraints	Morgantown, West Virginia
2013	Chercher le texte	Paris, France
2014	Hold the Light	Milwaukee, Wisconsin
2015	The End(s) of Electronic Literature	Bergen, Norway
2016	Next Horizons	Victoria, BC
2017	Electronic Literature: Affiliations, Comm, Translations	Porto, Portugal
2018	Attention á la marche / Mind the gap!	Montreal, Canada
2019	Peripheries	Cork, Ireland
2020	(un)continuity	Orlando, Florida (virtual)
2021	Platform (Post?) Pandemic	Bergen, Norway; Aarhus, Denmark & virtual
2022	Education and Electronic Literature	Como, Italy
2023	Overcoming Divides: Electronic Literature and Social Change	Coimbra, Portugal
2024	ELO (Un)linked	Online/University of Central Florida
2025	ELO@25: Love Letters to the Past and Future	Toronto and Waterloo, Ontario, Canada

== Publications ==
- The Electronic Literature Directory is a database of works of electronic literature.
- Two reports on the preservation of electronic literature were published in 2004 and 2005 by the ELO as part of the Preservation, Archiving, and Dissemination (PAD) project.
- A book series called Electronic Literature with Bloomsbury.
- Pathfinders, a documentation of the experience of early digital literature.

=== Electronic Literature Collections ===
The ELO has curated and edited four volumes of electronic literature.

Volume 1 (October 2006). Mark Marino noted in the Digital Humanities Quarterly, "Amidst the collection, there are some works that transcend the collection itself and stand out as pillars of electronic writing. Such pieces have already garnered much critical attention. Most notable among these would be Judd Morrissey’s The Jew’s Daughter, Michael Joyce’s Twelve Blue, Stuart Moulthrop’s Reagan Library, Talan Memmott’s Lexia to Perplexia, and Kate Pullinger’s Inanimate Alice.

Volume 2 (February 2011) Tim Wright explains that "the process of gathering, archiving and tagging the works to make them more easily available to a wider audience, also freezes (necessarily) what may have been otherwise ephemeral or in situ."

Volume 3 (February 2016) Urszula Anna Pawlicka noted that ELC3 represents a "post" code range of literature. This work also includes Qianxun Chen's Shan Shui, Porpentine's With Those We Love Alive, Borsuk's Between Page and Screen, Illya Szilak's Queerskins, Emily Short and Liza Daly's First Draft of the Revolution, Jeremy Height's 34 North 118 West, J.R. Carpenter's Along the Briny Beach, Mark Marino and Rob Wittig's Being@Spencer Pratt, Caitlin Fisher's Everyone at This Party is Dead, Anna Anthropy's Hunt for the Gay Planet, N. Katherine Hayle's Speculation.

Volume 4 (June 2022). ELC4 presents the largest and most diverse group yet of elit authors writing in Afrikaans, Ancient Chinese, Arabic, Catalan, Chinese, Danish, Dutch, English, French, German, Greek, Hungarian, Indonesian, isiXhosa, Italian, Japanese, Korean, Mezangelle, Norwegian, Polish, Portuguese, Romanian, Russian, Setswana, Simplified Chinese, Slovak, South African Sign Language, Spanish, Swedish, Turkish, Yoruba. This volume contains a reprise of Meghadutam by Priti Pandurangan.

== Awards ==
=== The 2001 Electronic Literature Awards ===
In 2001 the ELO announced the Electronic Literature Awards, with a $10,000 prize (funded by ZDNet) for the best work of fiction and the best work of poetry. 163 works were submitted, and each was reviewed by at least three people on the board, after which the highest scoring works were passed on to judges Larry McCaffery and Heather McHugh. Rettberg notes that the diversity of works submitted and shortlisted was "an eye-opener (..) in terms of what I might consider 'fiction' and 'poetry' to be in the e-lit context'.

In 2001, These Waves of Girls by Caitlin Fisher won the fiction prize and windsound by John Cayley won the poetry prize. The excitement of the era can be felt in an interview by the cable television channel TechTV with Fisher after the awards gala in New York.

=== ELO Awards (2014-) ===
After a pause due to a lack of funding, the ELO Awards were rekindled in 2014, and since then an annual award has been given to the best literary work and the best work of scholarship on electronic literature. Each award comes with a $1000 stipend.

==== Robert Coover Award for a Work of Electronic Literature ====
This award honors the year’s best work of electronic literature, of any form or genre.

Robert Coover Award for a Work of Electronic Literature
Year	Awarded to
2014	Jason Edward Lewis, Vital to the General Public Welfare
2015	Samantha Gorman and Danny Cannizzaro, Pry
2016	Scott Rettberg and Roderick Coover, Hearts and Minds: The Interrogations Project
2017	Alan Bigelow, How To Rob a Bank
2018	Will Luers, Hazel Smith, and Roger Dean, Novelling
2019	Ip Yuk-Yiu, False Words 流/言
2020	Karen Ann Donnachie and Andy Simionato, The Library of Nonhuman Books
2021	Leise Hook, The Vine and the Fish
2022	David Jhave Johnston, ReRites Honorable Mention: "Al Barrah" by Reham Hosny.
2023	Everest Pipkin, Anonymous Animal. Runner-up: "The (m)Otherhood of Meep (the bat translator)" by Alinta Krauth Honorable Mention: "The Decameron 2.0" by The Decameron Collective
2024	Halim Madi, Borderline. Runner-up: "Seeing" by Margot Machado Honorable Mentions: "Exocolony" by Lee Tusman; "Unboxing: Mrs. Wobbles and the Tangerine House" by the Marino family; "VideoDreams" by Fernando Montes Vera
2025	benjamin escalonilla godayol, Espejo de Carne

==== N. Katherine Hayles Award for Criticism of Electronic Literature ====
This award honors the best work of criticism of electronic literature of any length and is named for literary critic N. Katherine Hayles.

N. Katherine Hayles Award for Criticism of Electronic Literature
Year	Awarded to
2014	Johannes Heldén and Håkan Jonson, Evolution
2015	Sandy Baldwin, The Internet Unconscious: On the Subject of Electronic Literature
2016	Jeremy Douglass, Jessica Pressman, and Mark Marino, Reading Project: A Collaborative Analysis of William Poundstone’s Project for Tachistoscope
2017	David Jhave Johnston, Aesthetic Animism: Digital Poetry’s Ontological Implications
2018	Joseph Tabbi, Bloomsbury Handbook of Electronic Literature
2019	Scott Rettberg, Electronic Literature
2020	Mark Marino, Critical Code Studies
2021	Jessica Pressman, Bookishness
2022	Lai-Tze Fan (editor) “Critical Making, Critical Design,” Issue 01 of The Digital Review
2023	Lyle Skains, Neverending Stories: The Popular Emergence of Digital Fiction. Runner up: Opera aperta: Italian Electronic Literature from the 1960s to the Present" by Emanuela Patti. Honorable mention: “Girl Online” by Joanna Walsh
2024	Hannes Bajohr, "Artificial and Post-Artificial Texts: On Machine Learning and the Reading Expectations Towards Literary and Non-Literary Writing." Runner up: "Machine Mimesis: Electronic Literature at the Intersection of Human and Computer Imitation," by Malthe Stavning Erslev. Honorable mentions: Alessandro Ludovico, Tactical Publishing: Using Senses, Software, and Archives in the Twenty-First Century; Simone Murray: “The Short Story in the Age of the Internet.”
2025	Karel Piorecký and Zuzana Husárová, The Culture of Neural Networks: Synthetic Literature and Art in (not only) the Czech and Slovak Context (Karolinum Press, 2024; distributed by University of Chicago Press)

==== Marjorie C. Luesebrink Career Achievement Award ====
This award honors a visionary artist and/or scholar who has brought excellence to the field of electronic literature and has inspired others to help create and build the field.

Marjorie C. Luesebrink Career Achievement Award
Year	Awarded to
2016	Marjorie C. Luesebrink
2017	John Cayley
2018	N. Katherine Hayles
2019	Mez Breeze
2020	Judy Malloy
2021	Kate Pullinger
2022	Alan Sondheim
2023	Stephanie Strickland
2024	Dene Grigar
2025	Bertrand Gervais

==== Maverick Award ====
This award "honors an independent spirit: a writer, artist, researcher, programmer, designer, performer, or hybrid creator who does not adhere to a conventional path but creates their own and in so doing makes a singular contribution to the field of electronic literature."

Maverick Award
Year	Awarded to
2021	Talan Memmott
2023	Deena Larsen
2024	Allison Parrish
2025	Jason Nelson
