= Carrie Bodle =

American artist

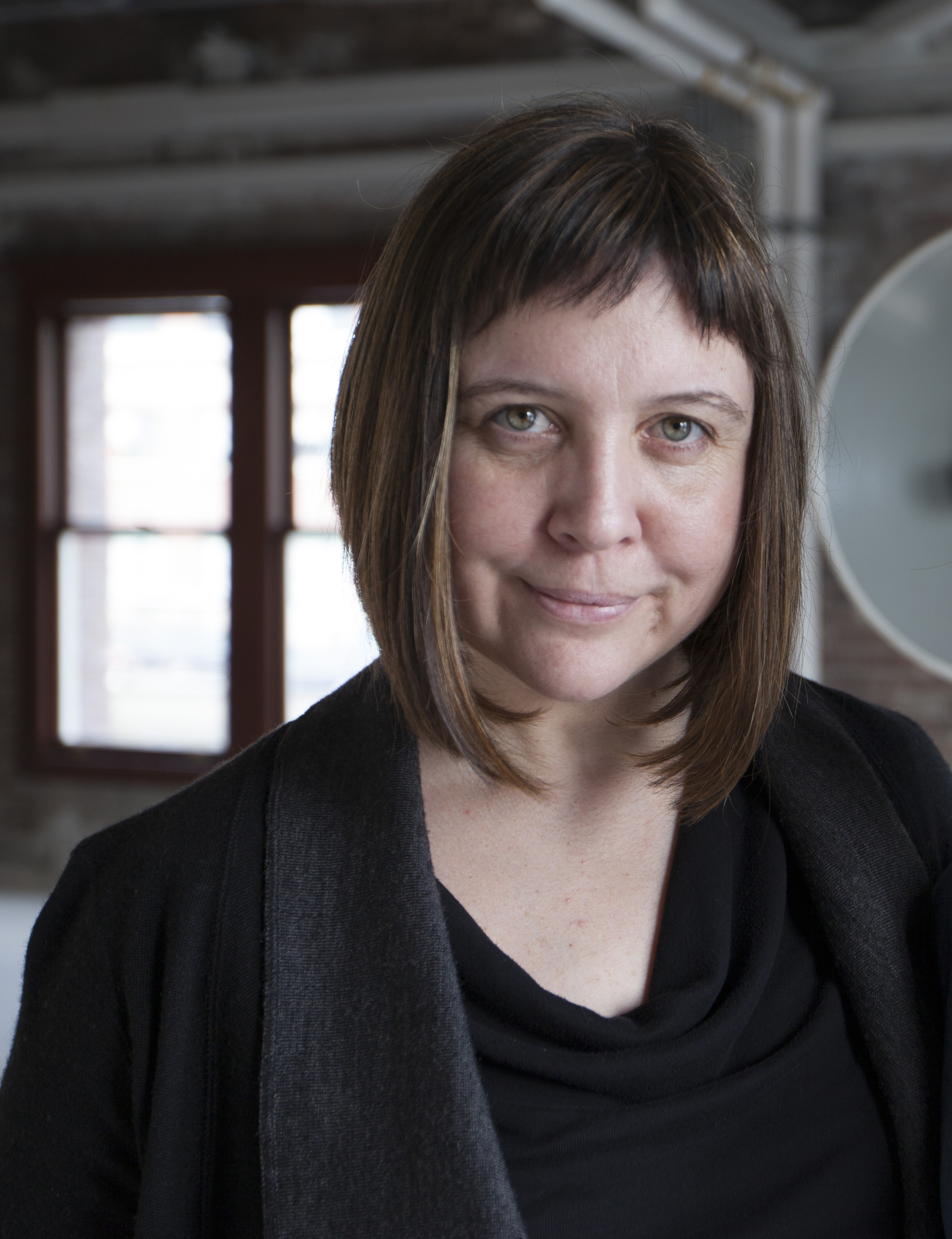
- Born: 1979 (age 46–47); London, Ohio
- Education: MSVS, Massachusetts Institute of Technology BFA Art and Technology, The Ohio State University
- Known for: Sound Art, Installation Art, Video Art, AR Art
- Notable work: Sonification/Listening Up Wavelines Boltworks Oscillations
- Website: https://www.carriebodle.com

Carrie Bodle (born 1979, London, Ohio) is an American visual and sound artist and educator based in Seattle, Washington.

== Early life and education ==
Bodle earned her BFA in Art and Technology from The Ohio State University in 2002 and later obtained her Master of Science in Visual Studies (MSVS) from the Massachusetts Institute of Technology (MIT) in 2005. At MIT, she was part of the Visual Arts Program, now known as Art, Culture, and Technology (ACT).

== Work and artistic practice ==
Bodle’s work primarily consists of immersive installations that explore the relationships between art and science, often translating inaudible or invisible phenomena into sensory experiences. Her projects frequently incorporate data-driven elements, sound, and visualization techniques to make scientific research accessible to the public. Notable works include Sonification / Listening Up, which utilized sound as a representation of atmospheric research from MIT Haystack Observatory, extending to the public what is normally invisible, and Wavelines, which used data from ecosystem models along the Washington Coast to create a multimodal experience of art through scientific research. She is a Teaching Professor at the University of Washington Bothell’s School of Interdisciplinary Arts and Sciences.

== Exhibitions and residencies ==
Bodle's art installations are the product of long-term collaborations with scientists. Starting with Sonification/Listening Up in 2005 her work explores the reuse of scientific data, to connect scientific practice with public exhibition. She has exhibited widely at venues including Location One Gallery in NYC, DeCordova Museum in Lincoln, MA, Grunwald Gallery at Indiana University, and CoCA Seattle. She has participated in artist residencies and fellowships, including the Rockefeller Foundation Bellagio Center, Boston Cyberarts/IBM Watson Collaborative User Experience Group in Cambridge, MA, and 911 Media Arts Center/Henry Art Gallery in Seattle, WA. Additionally, Bodle has been featured at the Seattle Art Book Fair (2023), with a collaboration with poet Amaranth Borsuk "Site/Archive/Cite," and at ISEA 2023, where she presented an artist talk on "SeaCycles: Work-In-Progress", an immersive AR art installation exploring the interplay between art and science.

== Public art and collections ==
Bodle’s work is included on the Sound Art Transit (WA), Oregon State (RACC), Washington State, City of Cambridge, and City of Seattle (WA) public art rosters and is part of the City of Seattle Public Utilities and City of Portland Portable Works Public Art Collections.
