= Emilia Díaz =

Emilia Díaz is an entrepreneur, writer, and businesswoman from Chile. In 2013 she founded the biotech company Kaitek Labs with a grant from the Chilean government for research and development. She is the founder and director of the first Latin American biotechnology network called Allbiotech.

== Awards and recognition ==
Díaz has been recognized as one of the top 100 young bioleaders of tomorrow by Global Biotech Revolution. She has also been named one of the top 100 young leaders of Chile and one of the top 100 female leaders of Chile.
