= Maryland Institute for Technology in the Humanities =

Research center at the University of Maryland

Maryland Institute For Technology In The Humanities
- Established: 1999
- Director: Neil Fraistat
- Administrative staff: 20
- Location: College Park, Maryland, USA
- Website: mith.umd.edu

The Maryland Institute for Technology in the Humanities (MITH) is an international research center, founded in 1999. A collaboration among the University of Maryland College of Arts and Humanities, Libraries, and Office of Information Technology, MITH cultivates research agendas clustered around digital tools, text mining and visualization, and the creation and preservation of electronic literature, digital games and virtual worlds.

== History ==
Made possible by a challenge grant in late 1998 by the National Endowment for the Humanities (NEH), MITH began operations during the fall semester of 1999, under Martha Nell Smith, Professor of English at the University of Maryland. Smith left the directorship in 2005 and was replaced by Neil Fraistat, who assumed the role first in a one-year "acting" capacity and then, permanently, in 2006.

== Projects ==
MITH is involved in several on-going projects, including the following:

- BitCurator, is a joint effort led by the School of Information and Library Science at the University of North Carolina, Chapel Hill (SILS) and the Maryland Institute for Technology in the Humanities (MITH) to develop a system for collecting professionals that incorporates the functionality of many digital forensics tools.
- Black Gotham Archive, links an interactive website, smart phones, and the geographical spaces of Lower Manhattan and Brooklyn to create a deeper understanding of nineteenth-century black New York. The project is an extension of the book, Black Gotham: A Family History of African Americans in Nineteenth-Century New York City, written by Carla Peterson. The Archive incorporates various new media forms to enable greater flexibility, interactivity, and potential for reaching a broader audience.
- centerNet, is an international network of digital humanities centers formed for cooperative and collaborative action to benefit digital humanities and allied fields in general, and centers as humanities cyberinfrastructure in particular. It developed from a meeting hosted by the U.S. National Endowment for the Humanities and the University of Maryland, College Park, April 12–13, 2007 in Washington, D.C., and is a response to the American Council of Learned Societies report on Cyberinfrastructure for the Humanities and Social Sciences, published in 2006.
- Corpora Space, which allows scholars to work at the cutting edge of digital humanities and textual analysis research. It is a space in which they can discover, analyze and curate digital texts across the 450 years of print culture in English from 1473 until 1923, along with the texts from the Classical world upon which that print culture is based.
- Digital Cultures and Creativity (DCC), provides a curriculum and learning community that combines art, imagination, and global citizenship with new media and new technologies. Depending on individual interest, DCC students pursue activities like digital music and video production, digital art, computer game design, creative electronic writing, virtual worlds, and developing online communities.
- Digital Mishnah, a digital edition of the Mishnah, a Jewish legal treatise from roughly 200 CE.
- Foreign Literatures in America (FLA), is a project devoted to the recovery and understanding of the significance of foreign authored literary works, as well as immigrant authored literary works, in the U.S. throughout U.S. history.
- MITH’s Vintage Computers, is a website showcasing the MITH’s collection of vintage computers, retro software, and other artifacts from the early era of personal computing. The centerpiece of the site is a considered metadata and modeling approach to computing hardware, whereby individual components of the vintage machines are documented, contextualized within their relation to the system as a whole, and expressed using Dublin Core. The site gathers links to other recent MITH projects in born-digital cultural heritage, and serves as a clearing house for our expanding portfolio in this area. It also includes newly written non-specialist’s documentation for the FC5025 Floppy Disk Controller, a device used to retrieve data off of obsolescent media formats.
- Music Theatre Online, is a digital archive of texts, images, video, and audio files relating to musical theater.
- Open Annotation Collaboration, The overarching goals of the Open Annotation Collaboration (OAC) are to facilitate to emergence of a Web and resource-centric interoperable annotation environment that allows leveraging annotations across the boundaries of annotation clients, annotation servers, and content collections, to demonstrate the utility of this environment, and to see widespread adoption of this environment.
- Preserving Virtual Worlds I & II, a project that explores methods for preserving digital games, interactive fiction, and shared real time virtual spaces.
- Project Bamboo, a partnership of ten research universities building shared infrastructure for humanities research. Within Bamboo, MITH is leading Corpora Space.
- Review, Revise, Requery, Using advanced computational methods, this project challenges longstanding critical assumptions about ekphrasis: that poets will ultimately comment on the stillness and muteness of the visual work of art; that ekphrastic speech turns upon the typically gendered axis of inter-arts rivalry; that descriptions of art and descriptions of nature in verse are indistinguishable in style and form.
- The Shelley-Godwin Archive. MITH is creating the project’s infrastructure with the assistance of the New York Public Library’s digital humanities group, NYPL Labs. With the Archive’s creation, manuscripts and early editions of texts from Percy Bysshe Shelley and his Circle will be made freely available to the public through a framework constituting a new model of best practice for research libraries.

== Resources ==
MITH is the host of the Deena Larsen Collection, a personal collection of early-era personal computers and software.

== Digital Dialogues ==
MITH hosts the Digital Dialogues series, which invites prominent scholars from the digital humanities, new media, and information technology fields to give a presentation on their current research.

== Affiliations ==
MITH is affiliated with the Dickinson Electronic Archives, Romantic Circles, and Electronic Literature Organization.
