= Shan Shui (disambiguation) =

Shan shui is a genre of Chinese painting.

Shan Shui, Shansui or Shangshui may also refer to:

- Shan Shui (electronic literature) an electronic literature work by Chen Qian Xun
- Shanshui poetry, Chinese landscape poetry
- Shangshui County, a county in Henan, China
