= Anonymous Animal =

Web browser poem and artwork by Everest Pipkin

- Author: Everest Pipkin
- Language: English
- Genre: electronic literature
- Publication date: 2022
- Awards: New Media Writing Prize, The Robert Coover Award for a Work of Electronic Literature
- Website: https://everest-pipkin.com/projects/anonymous_animal

Anonymous Animal is a work of electronic literature by Everest Pipkin. It was first published in the online literary journal The HTML Review in 2022.

It won the New Media Writing Prize in 2022, and the Robert Coover Award for a Work of Electronic Literature in 2023.

== About the work ==
Anonymous Animal is a poem that is designed to be read in a web browser and that can be viewed once an hour, on the hour. The poem lasts for 15 minutes, and in the breaks between runs the website shows images of animals. The work uses the HTML element iFrame to pull in various content from the web, including images, database entries and livestreams. The visual aesthetic is minimalist, with the iFrame surrounded by a white background and the text above it in a simple black serif font.

== Reception ==
Reviewer Tegan Pyke describes Anonymous Animal as a work of digital metaliterature because it comments on itself. For example, the narrator comments on the likelihood that the content being pulled in from the web may no longer be available by the time the reader experiences the work:

did that video even still load? or was it lost since i wrote this? in not too many years, this conversation will be a series of 404s

— Everest Pipkin, Anonymous Animal

Pyke writes that the gestural is central to the work, along with a nostalgia for the community and copresence of an imagined past internet. The work has also been described as using defamiliarization as a poetic technique.

The work won two major awards in electronic literature, the New Media Writing Prize in 2022, and the Robert Coover Award for a Work of Electronic Literature in 2023
