= The Vine and the Fish =

2020 animated web comic by Leise Hook

- Author: Leise Hook
- Language: American English
- Genre: electronic literature, webcomic, creative nonfiction
- Publisher: The Believer
- Publication date: October 2020
- Publication place: United States
- Awards: The Robert Coover Award for a Work of Electronic Literature
- Website: https://www.thebeliever.net/the-vine-and-the-fish/

The Vine and the Fish is an animated web comic by the American cartoonist Leise Hook, first published in 2020 in the online magazine The Believer. It won the 2021 Robert Coover Award for a Work of Electronic Literature at the annual conference of the Electronic Literature Organization, and has been described both as a nonfiction essay and as a work of electronic literature.

== About the work ==
The Vine and the Fish is an animated web comic, where the interaction occurs by scrolling through the story. Sometimes the reader must wait for an animation to play out. David Henry Thomas Wright, a scholar and author of electronic literature, writes in a close reading of the work that the visual is primary, the literary secondary.

It was published during the COVID-19 pandemic, and explores the author's position as an Asian in the United States during this time, when the xenophobia and fear of contagion that was often expressed as racism towards Asians and other groups. Themes include immigration, environmentalism and the harm caused by government policies. Throughout, the narrator is compared to an invasive species: Wright describes the "narrator walking and being represented as vines, as pathogens, as lines," and how these visual representations are needed as text alone cannot express "Hook's Asian-American experience."

Liesel Hamilton described The Vine and the Fish as a nature essay that engages with political questions: "only privileged perspectives are able to maintain a separateness from nature".

== Reception ==
The work won the 2021 Robert Coover Award for a Work of Electronic Literature at the annual conference of the Electronic Literature Organization, and has been discussed in peer-reviewed scholarly articles.
