= Kaitek =

Chilean biotechnology company

Kaitek (alternatively Kaitek Labs) is a Chilean biotech company focused on the development of bacterial sensors for environmental monitoring. It was founded in 2013 by Emilia Díaz. Current partners are: Emilia Díaz, Cristóbal Aller and Felipe Varea.

== Origins ==
Even though Kaitek was founded in July 2013, the company's first project "Red Tide Detection Kit" started its development in 2012, where it was chosen as one of the winners of a nationwide entrepreneurship competition. During the project's pre-development phase, Emilia was joined by Cristóbal Aller and Felipe Varea as partners of Kaitek. In December 2013, the company received a development grant from Corfo, the Chilean Economic Development Agency, to complete the research and development of their proposed project. The project has been awarded many prizes both in national and international contests, including BYU's “IBMC” (USA, 2015), AAAS's “GIST” (Morocco, 2014), Copec-UC's “Aplica tu idea” (Chile, 2014), Emprende UC's “Jump” (Chile, 2012) totaling over U$D 50K in prize money in three years.
