= Politics of Chile =

Chile's government is a representative democratic republic, in which the President of Chile serves as both head of state and head of government, within a formal multi-party system. Executive power is exercised by the president and their cabinet. Legislative power is vested in both the government and the two chambers of the National Congress. The judiciary operates independently of both the executive and legislative branches.

The Constitution of Chile was approved in a national plebiscite in September 1980, during the military dictatorship of Augusto Pinochet, and came into effect in March 1981. After Pinochet was voted out of office in 1988, the Constitution was amended the following year to simplify the process for future amendments.

In September 2006, President Ricardo Lagos signed into law several constitutional amendments passed by Congress. These reforms included eliminating the positions of appointed senators and senators for life, granting the President the authority to remove the commanders-in-chief of the armed forces, and reducing the presidential term from six to four years, while also prohibiting immediate re-election.

The Economist Intelligence Unit rated Chile a "flawed democracy" in 2023. According to the V-Dem Democracy indices, Chile was the third most electorally democratic country in Latin America in 2023.

Statistical analysis suggests that Chilean politicians in Congress are not randomly drawn from the population but over-represent high-income communities. As a result, Chileans of Castilian-Basque, Palestinian, and Jewish ancestry are disproportionately represented.

== History ==
The autocratic and conservative republic (1831–1861) was replaced by the liberal republic (1861–1891), during which some political conquests were made, such as proportional representation (1871) and the abolition of the condition of ownership to have the right to vote (1885). During the period 1896–1924, Chile enjoyed continuous free and fair elections.

=== Parliamentary Republic ===
When the era of the parliamentary republic began in 1891, the struggle between liberals (pipiolos) and conservatives (pelucones) had already evolved due to the emergence of a multi-party system. In the 1880s, the Liberals split into two factions: the moderates, who did not want to impose secularism too quickly and were willing to compromise with the Conservatives, and the radical Liberals, who joined the Radical Party founded in 1863 or the new Democratic Party with more progressive, if not socialist, ideas.

European and particularly British companies having appropriated a large part of the country's economy (saltpeter, bank, railroad, trade), President José Balmaceda (1886–1891), leader of moderate liberals, decided to react by directing his policy in two directions: the nationalization of saltpeter mines and the intervention of the State in economic matters. Already facing the conservative aristocracy, he alienated the bankers. He was dismissed by a vote of Parliament and pressure from part of the army. He committed suicide by firearm at the end of the civil war that his supporters lost.

=== Workers' struggles and social reforms ===
A new parliamentary regime emerged from the civil war; it was the government of Fronda aristocrática. From 1906 onwards, the Radical Party demanded social reforms and the establishment of a democratic regime. That same year, the leader of the Federation of Workers, Luis Emilio Recabarren, was elected to the House but his election was canceled by the House. In 1912 he founded the Socialist Workers Party.

Despite the country's good economic performance, life remains particularly hard for a large part of the population (12 or 14-hour working days for workers, very low wages, illiteracy of more than 50% in the years 1900–1910, etc.). Trade unionism was organized and fought; strikes and workers' demonstrations multiplied, sometimes very harshly repressed: general strike in Santiago (1905), railroads and mines in Antofagasta (1906), a demonstration in Iquique (1907). From 1911 to 1920, there were 293 strikes. Some repressions kill hundreds of people. The workers' movement was organized in the 1910s with the creation of the Chilean Regional Workers' Federation in 1913 and the Chilean branch of the Industrial Workers of the World in 1919.

In 1920, the economic crisis worsened the standard of living of the middle classes, which were politically closer to the working classes. This new situation led to the election of Arturo Alessandri Palma. During his first term in office, he pursued a progressive policy: labor law, the establishment of the tax on property income, the establishment of the Central Bank, creation of social security funds, etc. However, it must constantly deal with the Senate, always under Conservative control, which systematically tries to block its reforms. Shortly before his withdrawal from power, he drew up a new Constitution that was considered to be the advent of true democracy in Chile. This Constitution enshrines the separation of Church and State and religious freedom, declares compulsory primary education, restores presidentialism by electing the president by universal suffrage, and above all proclaims that property must be regulated in such a way as to ensure its social function.

== Legislative branch ==
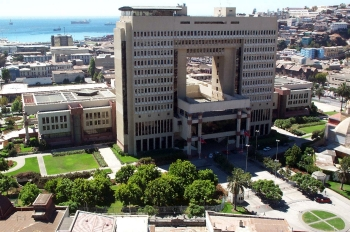
National Congress of Chile in Valparaíso

The bicameral National Congress (Congreso Nacional) consists of the Senate (Senado) and the Chamber of Deputies (Cámara de Diputados). The Senate is made up of 50 members elected from regions or subregions. Senators serve approximately eight-year terms. The Chamber of Deputies has 155 members, who are elected by popular vote to serve four-year terms. The last congressional elections were held on November 21, 2021.

For parliamentary elections, between 1989 and 2013 the binominal system was used, which promoted the establishment of two majority political blocs -Concertación and Alliance- at the expense of the exclusion of non-majority political groups. The opponents of this system approved in 2015 a moderate proportional electoral system that has been in force since the 2017 parliamentary elections, allowing the entry of new parties and coalitions.

Elections are very labor-intensive but efficient, and vote counting normally takes place the evening of the election day. One voting table, with a ballot-box each, is set up for at-most 200 names in the voting registry. Each table is staffed by five people (vocales de mesa) from the same registry. Vocales have the duty to work as such during a cycle of elections, and can be penalized legally if they do not show up. A registered citizen can only vote after his identity has been verified at the table corresponding to his registry. Ballots are manually counted by the five vocales, after the table has closed, at least eight hours after opening, and the counting witnessed by representatives of all the parties who choose to have observers.

The main existing political coalitions in Chile are:

Government:

- Apruebo Dignidad (Approve Dignity) is a left-wing coalition that has its origin in the 2021 Chilean Constitutional Convention election. After the success in that election, it held presidential primaries, in which Gabriel Boric (CS, FA) was the winner. It is formed by the coalition Frente Amplio (Broad Font) and the coalition Chile Digno (Worthy Chile) formed by the Communist Party of Chile and others left-wing parties.
- Democratic Socialism is a center-left coalition, successor of the Constituent Unity, and this of the Concertation -which supported the "NO" option in the 1988 plebiscite and subsequently governed the country from 1990 to 2010-. This pact is formed by the parties Socialist, for Democracy, Radical, and Liberal.

Opposition:

- Chile Vamos (Let's go Chile) is a center-right coalition with roots of liberal conservatism, formed by the parties Renovación Nacional (National Renewal), Unión Demócrata Independiente (Independent Democratic Union) and Evópoli. It has its origins in the Alliance coalition, formed by the main parties that supported the "YES" option in the 1988 plebiscite, although it has used different names since then. It was the ruling coalition during the first and second government of Sebastián Piñera, (2010–2014) and (2018–2022).

In the National Congress, Chile Vamos has 52 deputies and 24 senators, while the parliamentary group of Apruebo Dignidad is formed by 37 deputies and 6 senators. Democratic Socialism is the third political force with 30 deputies and 13 senators. The other groups with parliamentary representation are the Republican Party (15 deputies and 1 senator), the Christian Democratic Party (8 deputies and 5 senators), the Party of the People (8 deputies), and the independents outside of a coalition (5 deputies and 1 senator).

Since 1987, the Congress operates in the port city of Valparaíso, about 110 kilometers (68 mi) northwest of the capital, Santiago. However some commissions are allowed to meet in other places, especially Santiago. Congressional members have repeatedly tried to relocate the Congress back to Santiago, where it operated until the 1973 Chilean coup d'état, but have not been successful. The last attempt was in 2000, when the project was rejected by the Constitutional Court, because it allocated funds from the national budget, which, under the Chilean Constitution, is a privilege of the President.

== Legal system ==
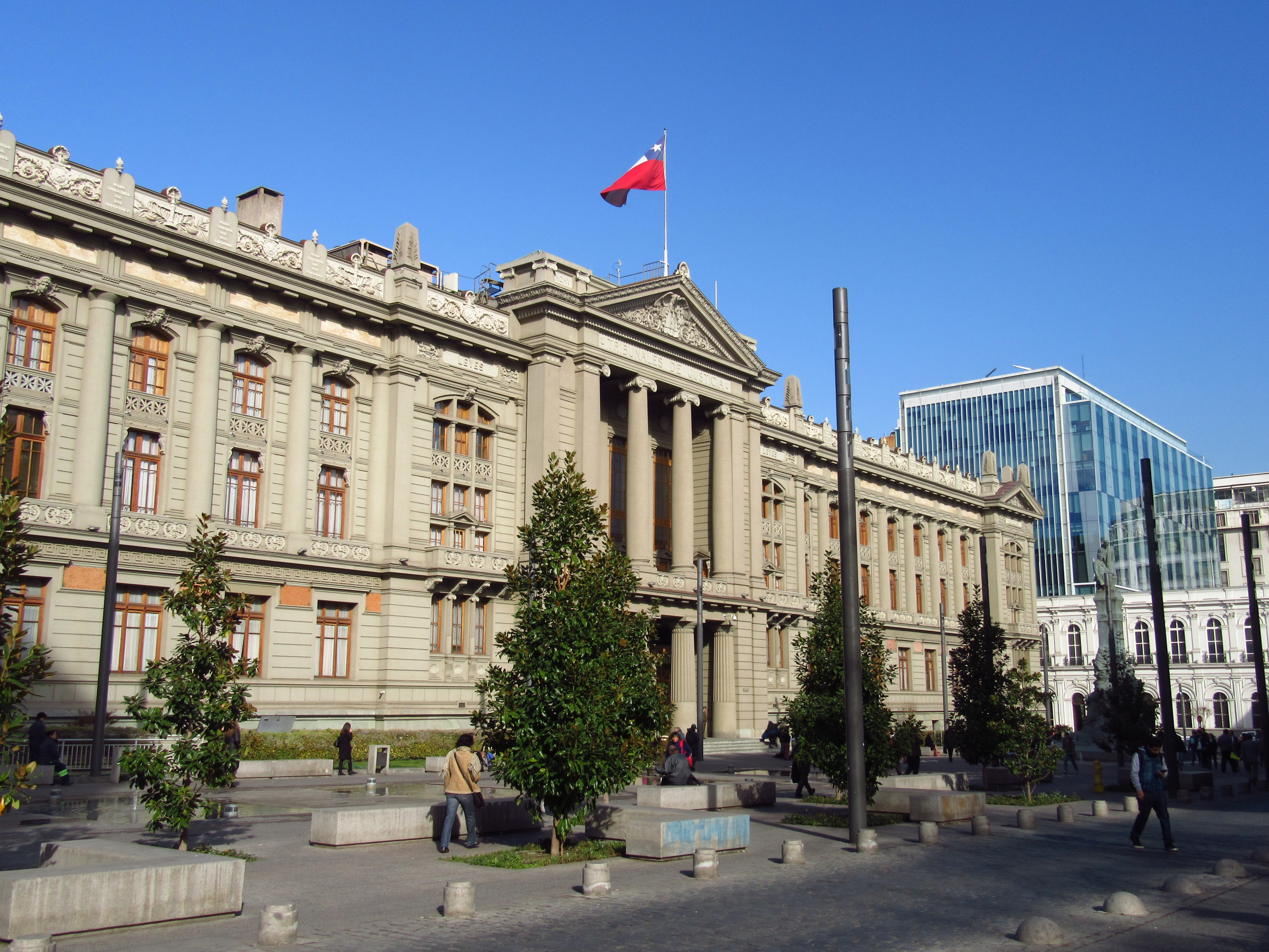
The Palacio de los Tribunales de Justicia de Santiago.

Chile's legal system is civil law based. It is primarily based on the Civil code of 1855, derived from Spanish law and subsequent codes influenced by European law of the last half of the 19th Century. It does not accept compulsory ICJ jurisdiction.

From the year 2000 onwards, Chile completely overhauled its criminal justice system; a new, US-style adversarial system has been gradually implemented throughout the country with the final stage of implementation in the Santiago metropolitan region completed on June 9, 2001.

== Pressure groups ==
Pressure groups according to the CIA World Factbook:

- Student federations at all major universities
- Roman Catholic Church
- Workers' United Center of Chile trade unionists from Chile's five largest labor confederations.

=== Advocacy for public policy change ===
Non-governmental organizations (NGOs) play an important role in advocating for public policy change in Chile. Certain NGOs, such as those working with migrants, have increased in Chile in the past decades. For example, one prominent NGO, Servicio Jesuita a Migrantes (SJM), conducts research in order to influence public policy. SJM has published dozens of papers with findings that ultimately influence public policy in Chile—ranging from educational access for immigrants to labor laws for immigrants. In December 2024, SJM and UNICEF hosted a joint seminar on the legal regularization of migrant children in Chile.

Other avenues of public policy advocacy include citizenship advocacy, union advocacy, and government advocacy. Unions have been especially successful at impacting public policy through strikes, collective bargaining, and legal mobilization. Student groups also have a strong history of impacting public policy, with perhaps the most prominent example being the 2011 student protests against neoliberal educational policies called the "Chilean Winter." The United Chilean Student Confederation (CONFECH), an organization composed of various student unions, including the Student Federation of the University of Chile (FECH) and the Student Federation of Catholic University (FEUC), led this movement.

Student groups, NGOs, and other advocacy organizations all face challenges to change-making within the Chilean political system. For example, many NGOs who help migrants receive limited funding and work amongst insufficient legislation, leading them to focus primarily on the individual, care-related needs of migrants rather than focusing on fulfilling the role of advocating for the advancement of migrant rights. Student groups have faced similar obstacles, such as legal barriers, in the fight for public policy change in Chile. These barriers do not completely overshadow political advocates' strengths, and it is not to dismantle the successful work they have done.

== Central-local government relations ==
Chile has an enduring unitary and centralised state power structure. The national government has substantial political, administrative and particularly fiscal control (see Table 1 below). For example, despite the establishment of regional governors in 2017 (covered further below), the executive positions of Presidential Delegates remain at regional and provincial levels (see Figure 1 below), with their appointment and dismissal at the President's discretion. The regional governor and regional presidential delegate constitutionally share functions, compromising good practice regional governance and the intended levels of political decentralisation.

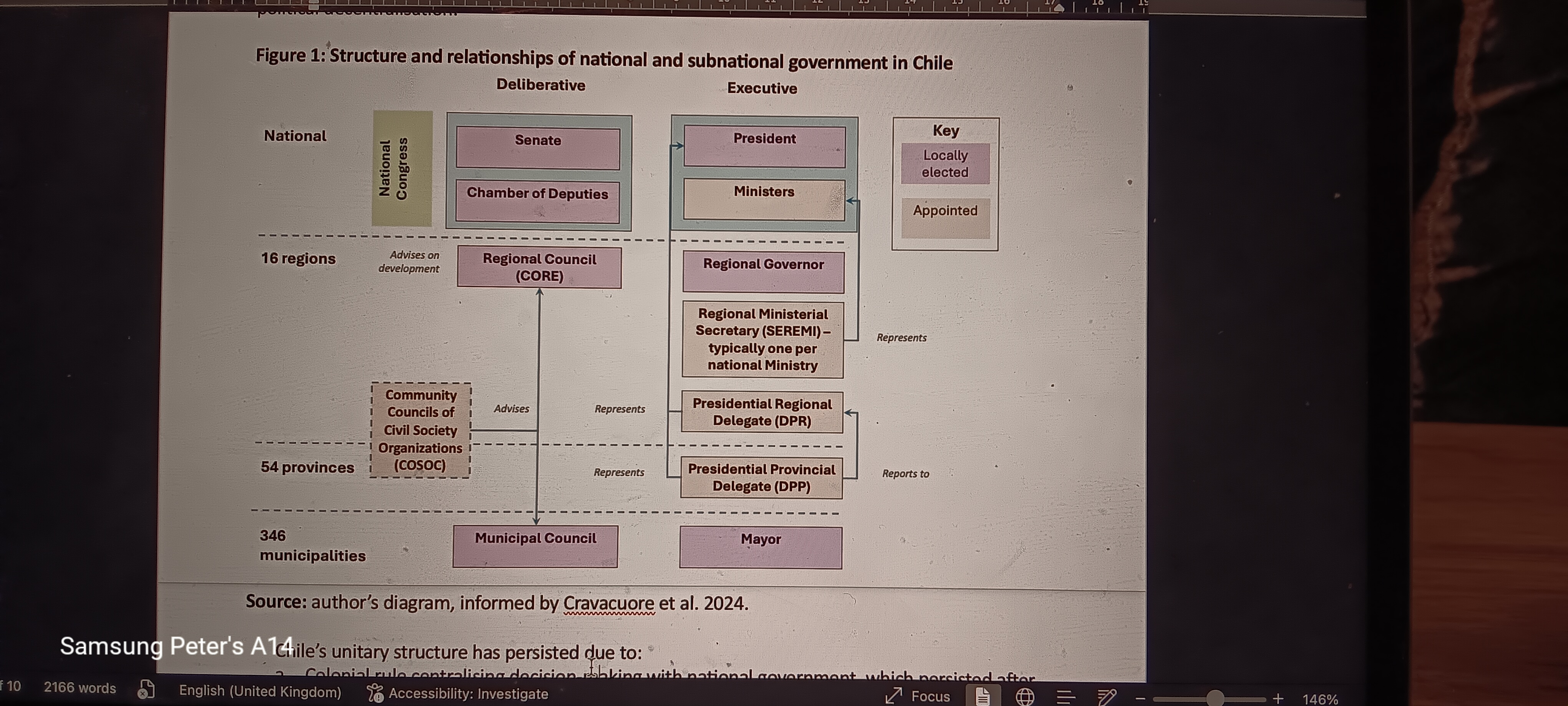
Figure 1: Structure and relationships of national and subnational government in Chile

Chile's unitary structure has persisted due to:

1. Colonial rule centralising decision-making with national government, which persisted after independence.
2. Chile's long, narrow geography and enduring population concentration in the Central Valley (including the nation's capital, Santiago), meaning that unitary governance is perceived as more practical.
3. Lack of empowered demand for an alternative (e.g. federal) structure due to a historical lack of strong and autonomous subnational movements.
4. A desire to build a unified nation and avoid the regional conflicts or independence movements in other Latin American nations attempting federalism (e.g. Argentina).
5. A desire to preserve the performance of Chile's economy through unified national control, and avoid the negative economic impacts of how decentralisation efforts were designed and implemented in other Latin American countries (e.g. Argentina).
6. The Pinochet regime (1973–1990), which enacted martial law, overthrew and banned democratic institutions and established the 1980s constitution. This constitution cemented military power, neoliberalism and established a deconcentration approach, where underfunded municipalities controlled by appointed officials were required to implement national policies.

Municipalities are the only self-government entities in Chile, with constitutionally-guaranteed autonomy, including for their:

- institution;
- interests and competences;
- election of their governing bodies;
- powers to set local regulations withstanding national equivalents.

Despite their partial political and administrative autonomy, municipalities have very low fiscal autonomy, with proportionally small and mostly pre-allocated funding (see Table 1 below). Chile is the only OECD country not to allow municipalities to borrow.

Table 1: Local and total government expenditure in Chile vs OECD average

| Aspect | Chile | OECD average |
|---|---|---|
| Local government expenditure (% of GDP) | 3% | 17% |
| Total public expenditure (% of GDP) | 13% | 40% |

Chile has very large disparities between municipalities, including in the concentration of population (almost twice the OECD average) and GDP (second highest in the OECD). One cause of these disparities is the dominance of very substantial copper and other mining activities in specific areas, without similar economic drivers in other areas.

Chile's centralised structure, and strong comparative disadvantage of many municipalities, creates incentives for municipal leadership to directly lobby national, rather than regional, government for local policy decisions or funded interventions which need significant executive power. For example, facing resource constraints and a fragmented Congress, municipalities approached the national government for support responding to escalating crime rates (particularly violent crime).

The President and Ministers may also engage directly with municipalities affected by their policies or interventions. These informal bilateral exchanges (see Figure 2 below) bypass the intended governance structure, undermine provincial and regional authorities, and create inefficiencies and inequity in forming and implementing policies and interventions.

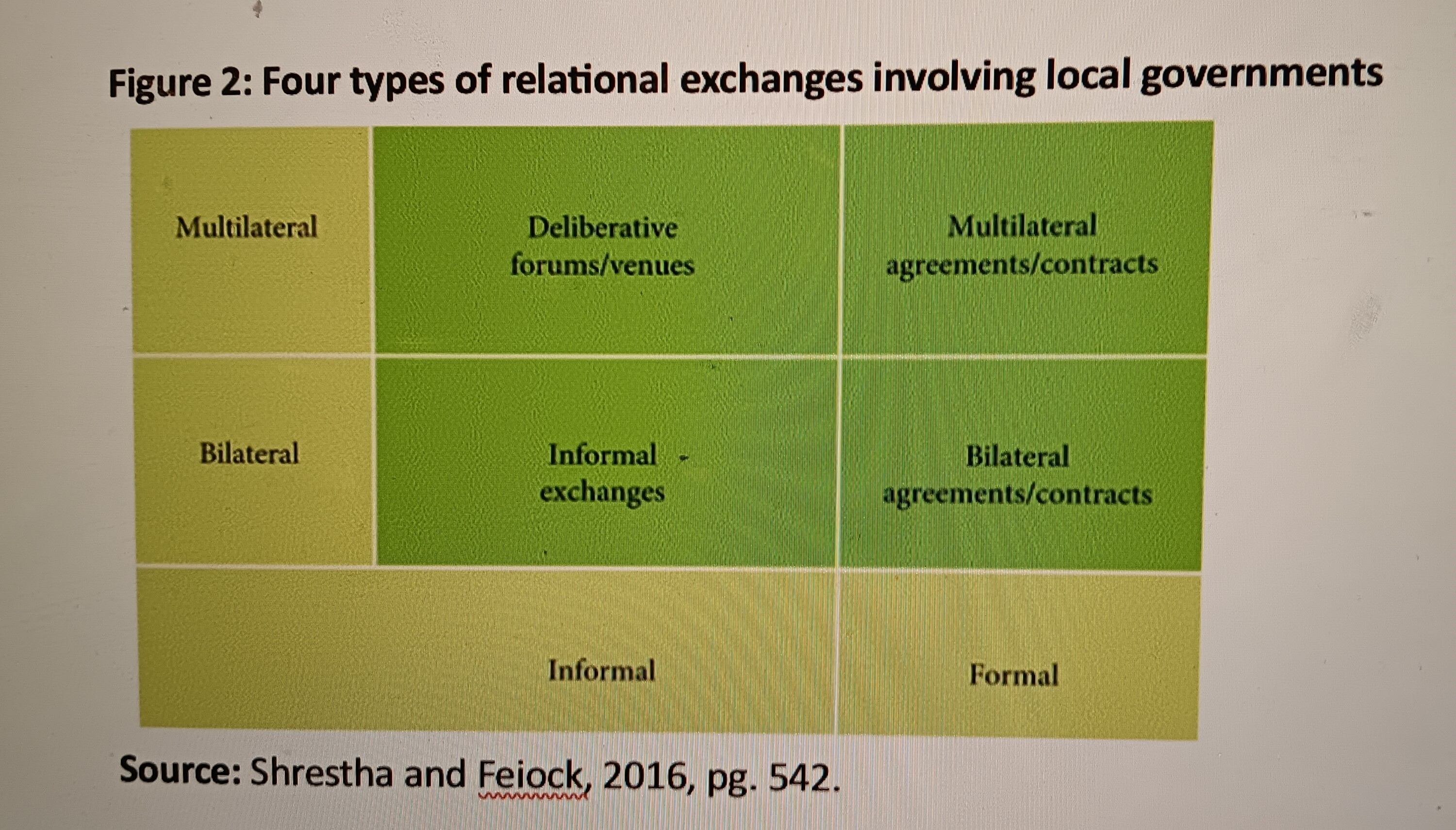
Figure 2: Four types of relational exchanges involving local governments

Where regions and municipalities coordinate or collaborate, this often depends on the autonomous power of the presidential delegate or head of the public service, or on the relationships or other capacities of the mayor or municipality to influence national institutions' decisions.

The 2017 Constitutional Reforms established the role of publicly elected regional governors. These governors, first-elected in 2021 to represent regional constituents, share responsibility with presidentially-appointed regional delegates/intendants, who represent national ministries. Their election was a turning point in decentralization efforts, introducing a new dynamic in national-regional relations and providing regions with a stronger voice in governance. However, Navarrete Yáñez argues that introducing this system, typical of federal structures, tends to fragment authority and create overlapping jurisdictions to promote coordination relations, which in practice is generating conflict. The current President of Chile, Gabriel Boric (2022–2026), stated that before his term ends, the presidential delegate position will disappear.

The decentralisation agenda in Chile recently received impetus, with:

1. a presidential advisory commission for decentralisation defining a decentralisation agenda
2. 2018 laws introducing direct election of regional governors, rather than the previous presidential appointment only. These laws also defined the powers and responsibilities of regional authorities and encouraged citizen participation. The first election of regional governors occurred in 2021.
3. A 2020 referendum, in which 78% of voters supported the creation of a new constitution and the establishment of a Constitutional Convention. Two subsequent referendums (September 2022 and December 2023) proposed replacements of the existing Pinochet-era constitution, including:
  1. reducing the dominance of central government and strengthening regional governance
  2. establishing 'regional states' comprising autonomous regions, communes, indigenous territorial autonomies and special territories.

Despite the strong impetus for a new constitution, both new constitutional proposals were rejected by voters. Particularly given the substantial social upheaval in 2019 related to inequality, and majority support for a constitutional re-write, these rejections are significant. By comparison, from 1789 to 2016, 94% of 179 referendums for new constitutions were ratified, making Chile's twin rejections rare exceptions.

Unclear sector responsibilities, siloed work

There are many unclear sector responsibilities at national level. Significant work occurs in silos, with poor integration across both policy and investment areas. For example, responsibilities for the intercity network, for the urban transport utilising that network and for investment in urban roads lie with three different national ministries. Inadequate inter-sector coordination and consultation about local conditions leads to poor quality decisions – for example, decisions on types of transport infrastructure, routes and frequencies which don't suit local needs or represent good value for taxpayers. Chilean citizens feel affected by the lack of national sector coordination.

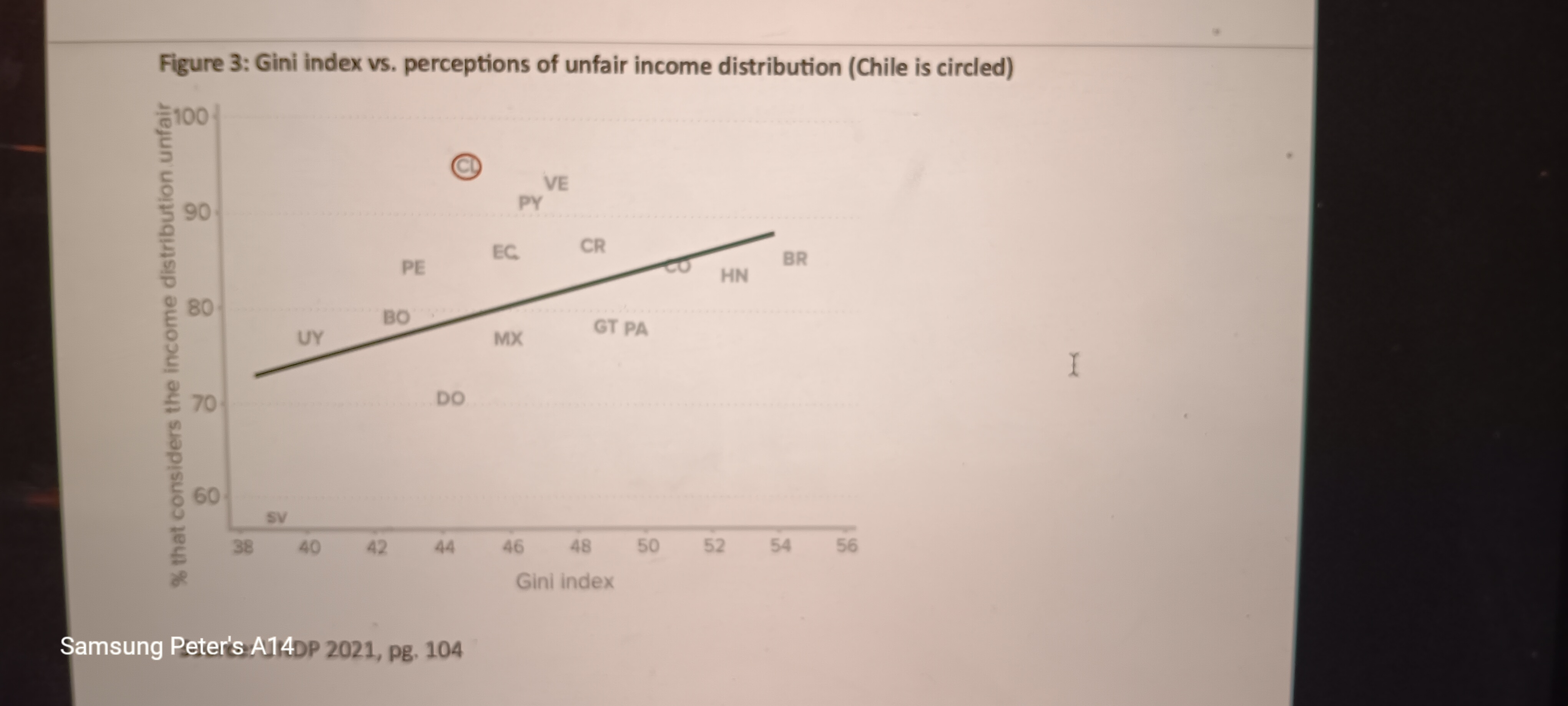
Figure 3: Gini index vs. perceptions of unfair income distribution (Chile is circled)

Poor central-regional-local coordination and subnational consultation

Local policies, planning instruments and priorities are centrally defined by national ministries but with weak subnational consultation and coordination. For example, the Government response to COVID reinforced a need to formalise how coordination between national, regional and local government occurs, particularly during emergency situations involving constitutional exceptions.

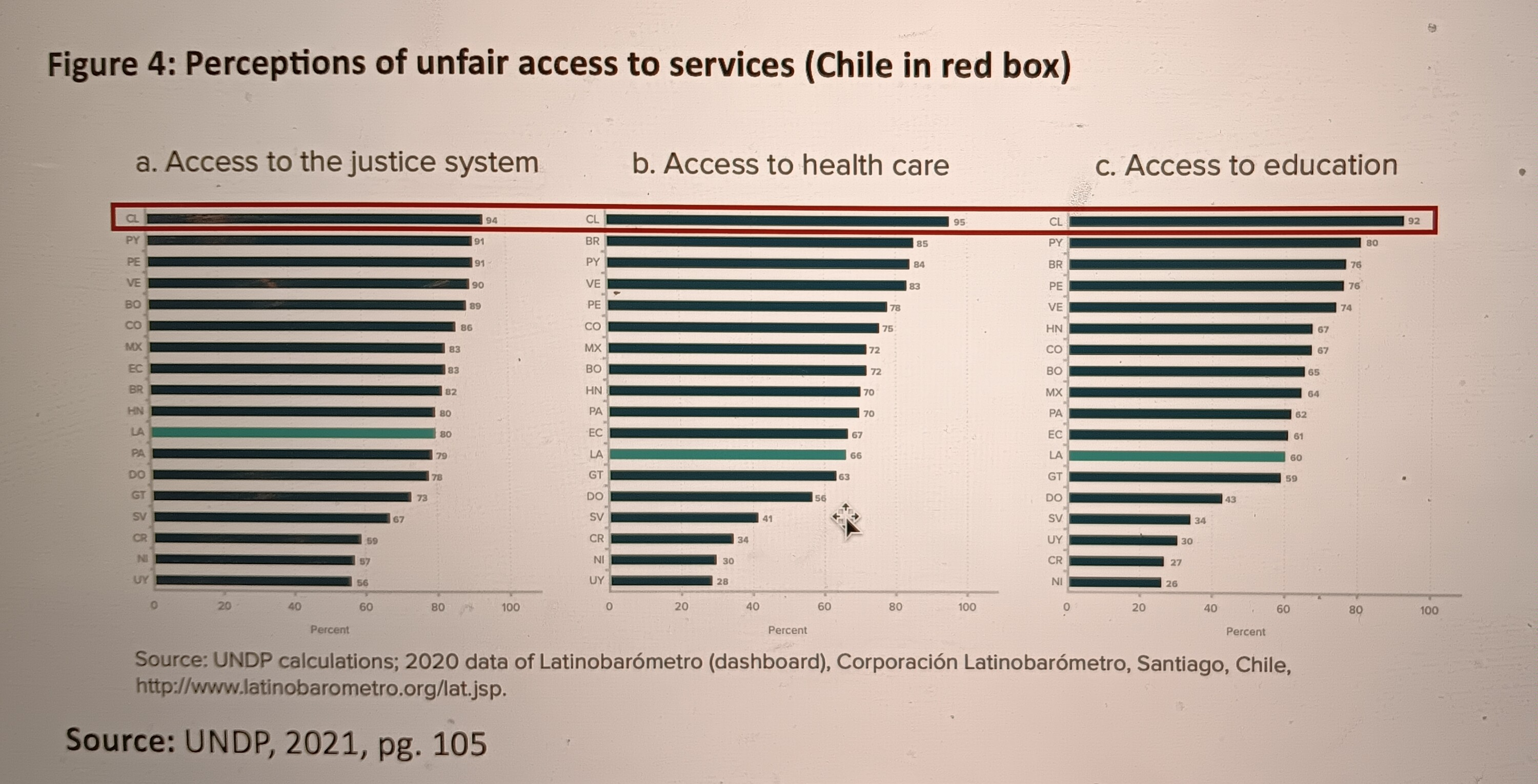
Figure 4: Perceptions of unfair access to services (Chile in red box)

There are positive developments in subnational consultation. In January 2023, an agreement was signed with the Association of Regional Governors of Chile (AGORECHI) to advance political decentralisation, particularly intra-government coordination and local participation, administrative decentralization, fiscal decentralization and the development of a National Decentralization Policy.

Social inequity and intra-government structure and relations

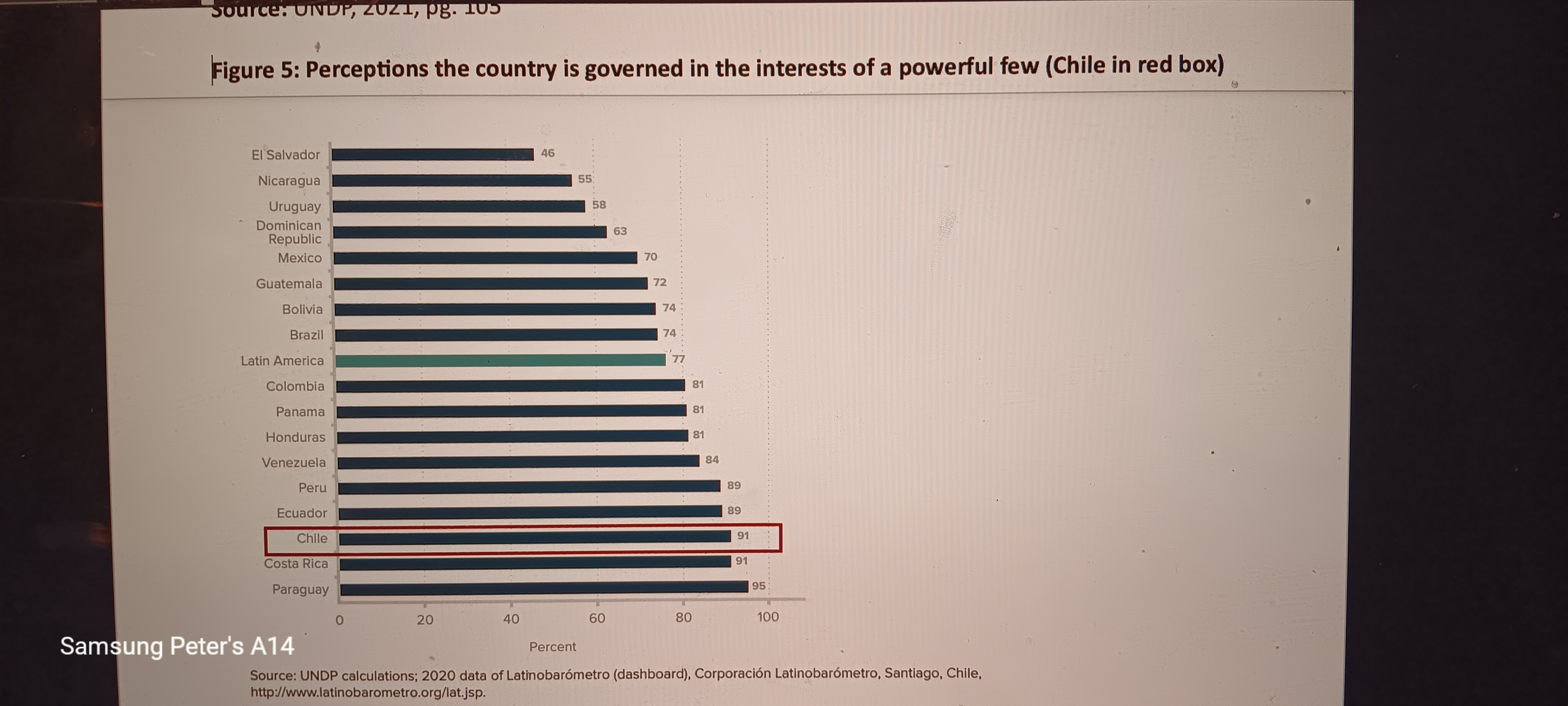
Figure 5: Perceptions the country is governed in the interests of a powerful few (Chile in red box)

One study shows that 91%-95% of Chileans perceive that access to income is inequitable (Figure 3); that access to healthcare, justice and education is inequitable (Figure 4); and that Chile is governed in the interests of a powerful few (Figure 5).

Chile's centralized governance system contributes to limiting equitable resource distribution and effective local solutions. Recent initiatives, for example, Carolina Gainza's work with universities as Undersecretary of Science, Technology, Knowledge, and Innovation (2022-2024) have helped focus on equity and equality.

== International organization participation ==
Chile or Chilean organizations participate in the following international organizations:

- Agency for the Prohibition of Nuclear Weapons in Latin America and the Caribbean (OPANAL)
- Asia-Pacific Economic Cooperation (APEC)
- Bank for International Settlements (BIS)
- Food and Agriculture Organization (FAO)
- Group of 15 (G-15)
- Group of 77 (G-77)
- Inter-American Development Bank (IADB)
- International Atomic Energy Agency (IAEA)
- International Bank for Reconstruction and Development (World Bank)
- International Civil Aviation Organization (ICAO)
- International Criminal Court (party since 2005)
- International Chamber of Commerce
- International Development Association (IDA)
- International Fund for Agricultural Development (IFAD)
- International Finance Corporation (IFC)
- International Federation of Red Cross and Red Crescent Societies (IFRCS)
- International Hydrographic Organization (IHO)
- International Labour Organization (ILO)
- International Monetary Fund (IMF)
- International Maritime Organization (IMO)
- Interpol
- International Olympic Committee (IOC)
- International Organization for Migration (IOM)
- International Organization for Standardization (ISO)
- International Red Cross
- International Telecommunication Union (ITU)
- International Trade Union Confederation (ITUC)
- Latin American Economic System (LAES)
- Latin American Integration Association (LAIA)
- Mercosur (associate)
- Non-Aligned Movement (NAM)
- Organization of American States (OAS)
- Organisation for the Prohibition of Chemical Weapons (OPCW)
- Permanent Court of Arbitration (PCA)
- Rio Group
- Union of South American Nations (UNASUR)
- United Nations (UN)
  - UN Conference on Trade & Development (UNCTAD)
  - United Nations Educational, Scientific, and Cultural Organization (UNESCO)
  - UN High Commissioner for Human Rights (UNHCR)
  - UN Industrial Development Organization (UNIDO)
  - UN Military Observer Group in India and Pakistan (UNMOGIP)
  - UN Mission in the Democratic Republic of the Congo (MONUC)
  - UN Truce Supervision Organization (UNTSO)
- Universal Postal Union (UPU)
- World Customs Organization (WCO)
- World Federation of Trade Unions (WFTU)
- World Health Organization (WHO)
- World Intellectual Property Organization (WIPO)
- World Meteorological Organization (WMO)
- World Tourism Organization (WToO)
- World Trade Organization (WTO)

== See also ==
- President of Chile
- List of presidents of Chile
- List of political parties in Chile
- Foreign relations of Chile
- Law of Chile
- Hate speech laws in Chile
- Human rights in Chile
- Judiciary of Chile
- Chilean political scandals
- Augusto Pinochet
