= Jason Edward Lewis =

Indigenous artist and scholar

Jason Edward Lewis is an artist and scholar of digital media. Of Samoan and Hawaiian descent, Lewis explores how creative computation and artificial intelligence can sustain Indigenous cultures. He is Professor of Computation Arts at Concordia University, where he founded the Obx Laboratory for Experimental Media and co-directs the Indigenous Futures Research Centre, both of which focus on the intersection of Indigenous knowledge and digital media.

Lewis completed undergraduate degrees in Symbolic Systems (B.Sc.) and German Studies (B.A.) at Stanford University and earned a Master of Philosophy in Design from the Royal College of Art.

== Career and research ==
Lewis develops scholarly and artistic projects that draw on digital media and Indigenous cultural principles. He is a lead researcher on the multi-year Abundant Intelligences program, which reframes artificial intelligence through Indigenous knowledge systems.

Earlier, Lewis co-organized the Indigenous Protocol and AI workshops and contributed to its widely cited position paper on ethical AI development. He also established Obx Labs and co-founded Aboriginal Territories in Cyberspace (AbTeC), collaborative initiatives that combine art, storytelling, and software design to support Indigenous community-building in digital environments.

Lewis's creative works have been showcased at venues including Ars Electronica, ISEA, Elektra, SIGGRAPH, and the Hawaiian International Film Festival.

== Awards and honors ==
Lewis received the inaugural Robert Coover Award for Best Work of Electronic Literature, two Honorable Mentions from Prix Ars Electronica, and multiple awards from ImagineNative Film and Media Arts Festival. He is a Fellow of the Royal Society of Canada and has held fellowships with the Pierre Elliott Trudeau Foundation, the Carnegie Foundation, and the MIT Open Documentary Lab.
