= Between Page and Screen =

- Author: Amaranth Borsuk and Brad Bouse
- Language: English
- Genre: Digital poetry, electronic literature
- Publication date: 2012
- Website: https://www.betweenpageandscreen.com/

Between Page and Screen is an experimental book written by Amaranth Borsuk and Brad Bouse. Published in 2012, the book integrates printed media with digital technology through augmented reality. Instead of traditional text, it contains QR codes that prompt the digital text to show up on the screen when viewed through a web camera.

== Origins and influences ==
Between Page and Screen explores the relationship between physical media and electronic media. Borsuk was first inspired by this relationship while writing her dissertation at the University of Southern California, which later led her to work together with Brad Bouse on the book. Other inspirations include the etymologies behind the terms page and screen, which are referenced within the book's poems.

Borsuk describes the process of creating Between Page and Screen as "careful, mysterious, guarded", suiting the minimalist aesthetic and themes of the book.

=== Publication history ===
The first edition of Between Page and Screen was first published as a handmade book, which was letter-press printed at the Otis College of Art and Design. In contrast to its second edition—which is the one currently available for purchase on the website—the first edition contains no text.

== Story structure and navigation ==
There is no text in regards to the story of Between Page and Screen. The only textual elements within Between Page and Screen are blurbs such as editorial notes, authors' bios, and review excerpts. The content of the book itself is navigated through the use of the QR codes on its pages, which were built with the structure of the open-source software FLARToolKit. These codes were made deliberately distinct with their asymmetry and square design in place of having page numbers within the book.

When the codes are processed through the web camera, the corresponding text is projected into digital space. These texts follow the epistolary romance between the book's two character, P. and S.

== Literary significance and critical reception ==
The state of Between Page and Screen as a physical book and multimedia story has been critically analyzed by several reviewers and electronic literature scholars. Several reviews discuss how readers must re-learn how to read in order to understand the work, which de-familiarizes the reader with the practice and forces them to actively engage with the process of reading:

The so-called defamiliarization (estrangement) disrupts this automatic, mechanical process of reading and understanding (guessing the meaning) which kills the words and the literature. It can be achieved by confronting the reader with something which cannot be processed automatically (or which, if processed in this way, makes no sense and provokes the reader to stop for a moment and think).

- "So whilst the object itself contains many of the conventional traces of the book, the text itself remains concealed: meaning that the object circumvents being conceptualised as a book, but instead is understood as part of a multimedia system, whose pages function in the creation of a ‘textual environment’ (1), as Ortega puts it."

- " The work requires us to learn how to read it—to learn to adopt an embodied position through which to hold the book in front of the web-camera and to position ourselves where we can view the projected text askance between page and screen. It defamiliarizes our accustomed practice of reading and our normative stance of holding a book. In doing so, it demands that we turn our attention to the material of literature."

-- "In re-learning to read, hopefully the reader is reminded that the book has always structured our relationship with it."

- " Between Page and Screen dispels this ideology of the page and the anthropocentrism associated with codexical media. In doing so, it reminds us that, in the age digital reading, humans are not the only actors making, processing, and reading literature. Computers are also active participants, particularly when it comes to digital text and literature."

- "Should BPaS be referred to as a book, a website, an Augmented Reality (AR) engine or all three? Does focusing first on the printed book unjustly take attention away from the technological prowess of Brad Bouse, the AR designer?"

--- "So, firstly – the literary images present in Borsuk and Bouse’s work employ the device of estrangement."

-- "Secondly, the aural form of the texts comprising Between Page and Screen (let us recall here all the word plays with etymology discussed above) is a clear example of what estrangement can be. It seems important that this level of the text is really “Gogol-like”. Because the words do not sound as “normal” and the puns and other word-tricks interrupt the mechanistic act of processing, the text cannot be read automatically. We cannot “guess” or “recognize” the meaning – we have to deduce it from the whole form of the literary communication."

-- "Thirdly, it is indisputable that defamiliarization was applied to create the visual and the material form of the book. Neither the animated poems nor the material book (which cannot be read “normally”) can be processed “automatically”. One has to stop, think about the whole act of reading and find a way to correlate the letters – moving, metamorphosing or just spread in space – or even to discover the words 20. And this leads us to the last but not least thing – to the defamiliarization of the act of reading."

-- "The reflection about the media-text relation, which is one of the topics of Page and Screen, enters into the reader’s world. And they have to stop automating the “natural” act of reading." - "In an era of “convergence culture,” wherein readers are producers and content streams across multiple media platforms, we need not be beholden to traditional categories and constraints for describing and isolating media or genres or historical trajectories. Between Page and Screen argues this point by producing a hybrid reading practice that is not just about using multiple media but also about bridging and blending them. The work invites us to read for connections between old and new media, between different types of machine writing."

- "The cultural awareness about using a digital device in the reading of a print book is something that develops alongside the technical innovation that is taking place worldwide. In other words, minds change along with the tools.Both the human and the machine are required in order to read in an augmented reality environment. However, it is not only the skills of the readers reading augmented reality that are combinatory; the demands that are posed on the creators of augmented reality stories are also diversified"
