= Caitlin Fisher (artist) =

Canadian media artist, poet, writer, and professor

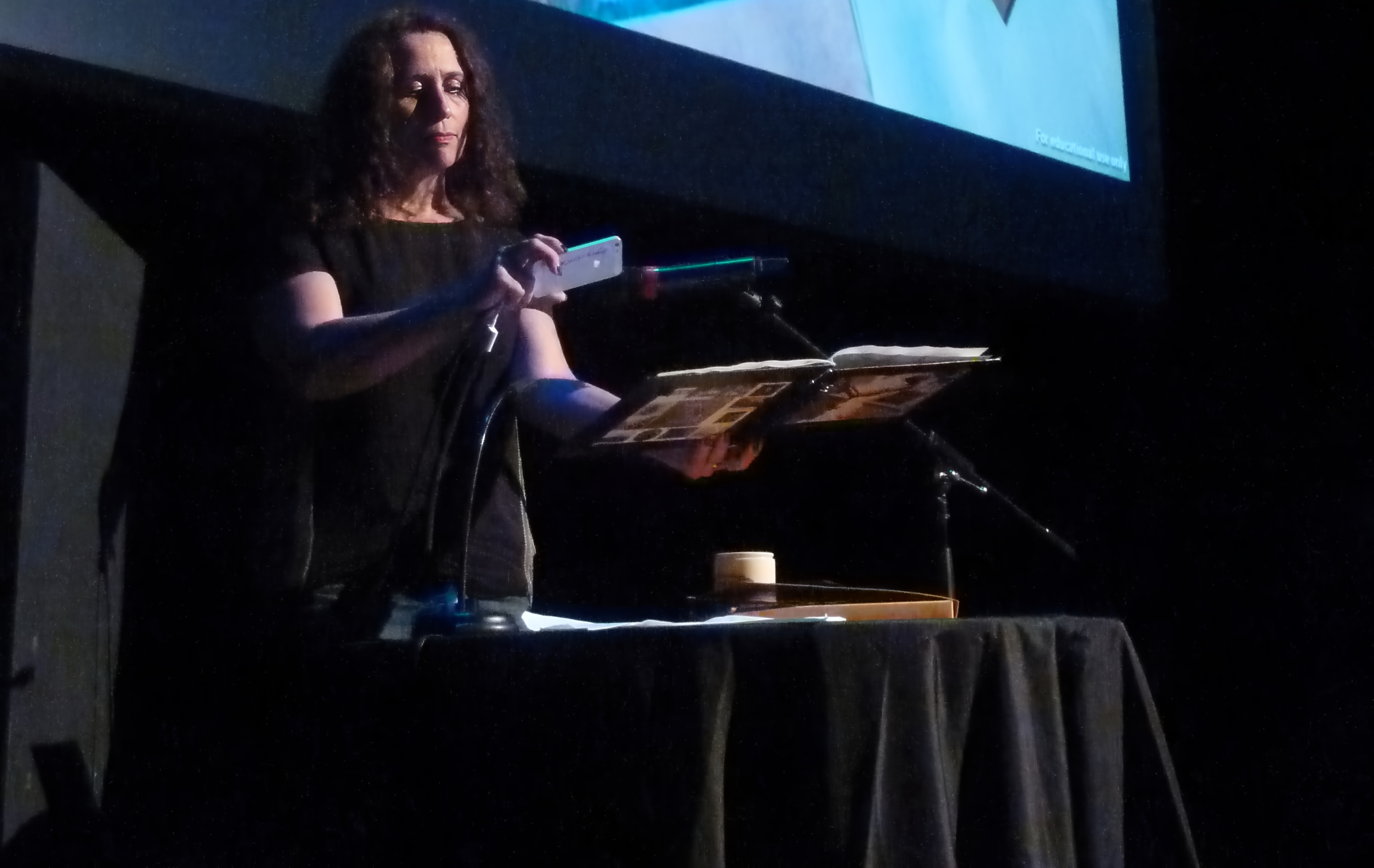
Caitlin Fisher reading from her XR work 200 Castles at The Kitchen, NYC

Caitlin Fisher is a Canadian media artist, poet, writer, futurist and Professor of Cinema and Media Arts at York University in Toronto where she also directs the Immersive Storytelling Lab and the Augmented Reality Lab. Fisher is also a co-founder of York's Future Cinema Lab, former Fulbright and Canada Research Chair, and an international award-winning digital storyteller. Creator of some of the world's first AR poetry and long-from VR narratives. Pioneer of research-creation who defended Canada's first born-digital dissertation. Member of the early AR artist collective Manifest AR. Fisher is also known for the 2001 hypermedia novel These Waves of Girls, and for her work creating content and software for augmented reality. "Her work is poetic and exploratory, combining the development of authoring software with evocative literary constructs."

== Research career ==
Fisher joined the faculty of York University, Toronto in 2000 and held the Canada Research Chair in Digital Culture in the Faculty of Fine Arts from 2004 to 2014. She is a co-founder of York's Future Cinema Lab, and Director of York's Augmented Reality Lab and Immersive Storytelling lab. At York, Fisher sat on the executive of the Centre for Information Visualization and Data-Driven Design, was a core member of Vision: Science to Applications (VISTA) and is a core member of Connected Minds, which is a research program led by York University in partnership with Queen's University that studies the risks and benefits modern technology has on society.

She currently serves as President of the Electronic Literature Organization, and on the international Board of Directors for HASTAC - the Humanities, Arts, Technology, Alliance, and Collaboratory. She is also affiliated with the Center for Digital Narrative, a Norwegian Centre of Research Excellence funded by the Norwegian Research Council from 2023 to 2033. The goal of the CDN is to deepen our knowledge of how digital technologies impact one of the most fundamental human activities: how we tell the stories, that shape our lives and understanding of the world. In this capacity, Fisher is collaborating with Scott Rettberg and Jason Nelson on practice-based experimental research. She is known for working at the intersection of technology and making bold predictions about the future of technology, with humanities and the fine arts at the centre of her work, offering this, for example, in 2013: "The idea that devices that have gone small is a real cusp moment where the handheld device will mediate the world… The hardware is changing; the software is changing. We’ve spent years developing trying to build easy, expressive tools for artists so we get a critical mass of content. The compelling content isn’t there yet… And I’m still a story-driven person. I still think there are things that we crave that will appear in different forms for different people. … The next moment is coming: the new devices are coming and more people will have them, and finally, we do have a critical mass where we’ll see excellent work. … There’s a lot at stake for humanists, for creative people: is this going to be another way our lives are instrumentalized – or is it going to be a chance for a crazy poetic world?"

Fisher is the author of Canada's first born-digital hypertextual dissertation and the winner of the first Electronic Literature Award for Fiction, in 2001, for the hypertext novella These Waves of Girls. Fisher acted in Midnight Stranger, one of the world's first interactive CD-ROM dramas, in 1993.

She recently directed Fiery Sparks of Light, a volumetric XR project featuring iconic Canadian women poets (Atwood, Brossard, Tolmie, Lubrin). Produced with the participation of Telefilm Canada, 'Fiery Sparks of Light' is a CFC Media Lab and York University Immersive Storytelling Lab Co-Production in Partnership with Griffin Trust for Excellence in Poetry.

Fisher became president of the Electronic Literature Organization in 2022. Fisher co-organized the Electronic Literature Association's 25th anniversary conference, Love Letters to the Future, at York University and Waterloo University, with Lai-Tze Fan.

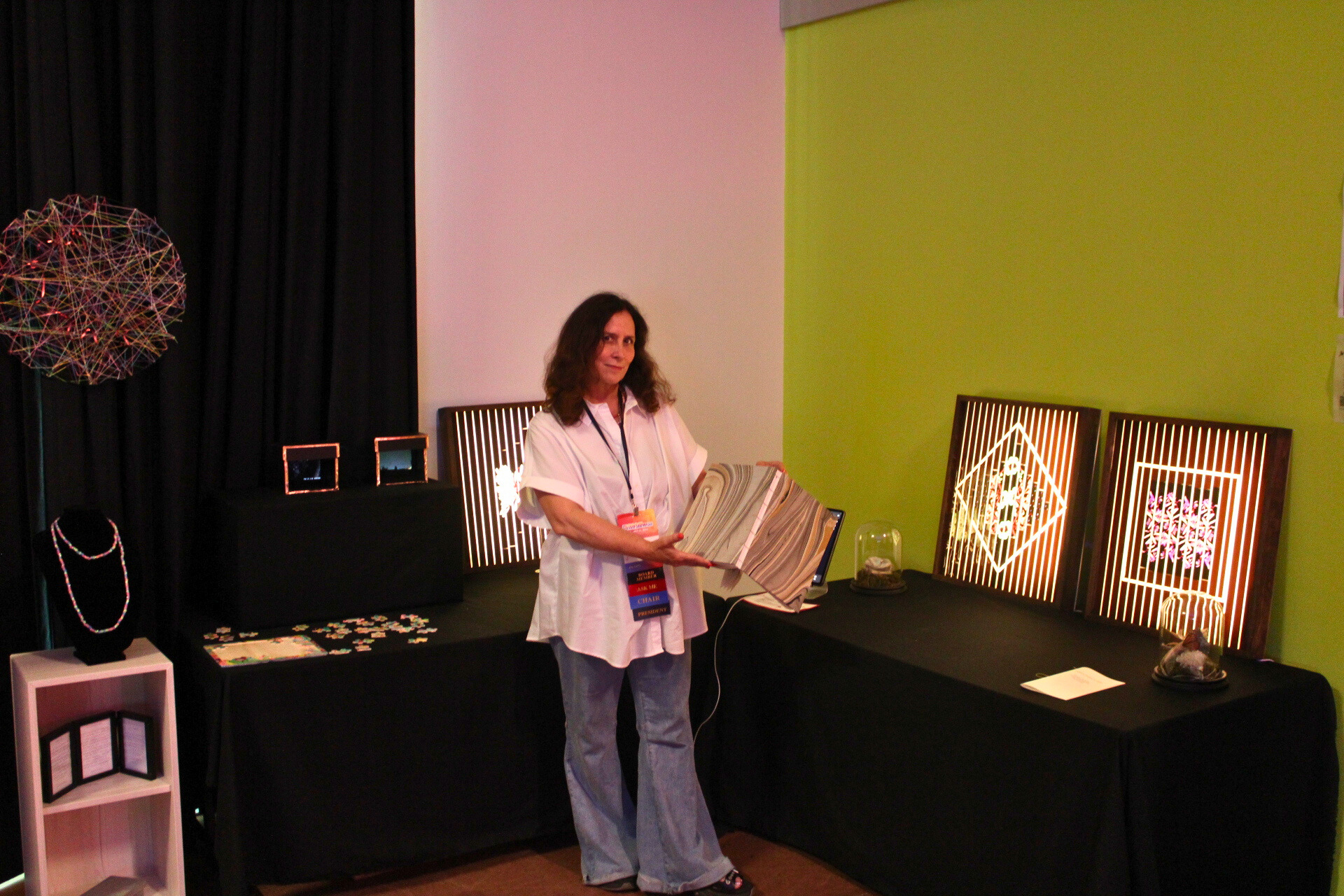
Caitlin Fisher is showing the work of the Decameron Collective, Metamorphoses: Love Letters to the Future (2025).

== Creative works ==
=== These Waves of Girls (2001) ===
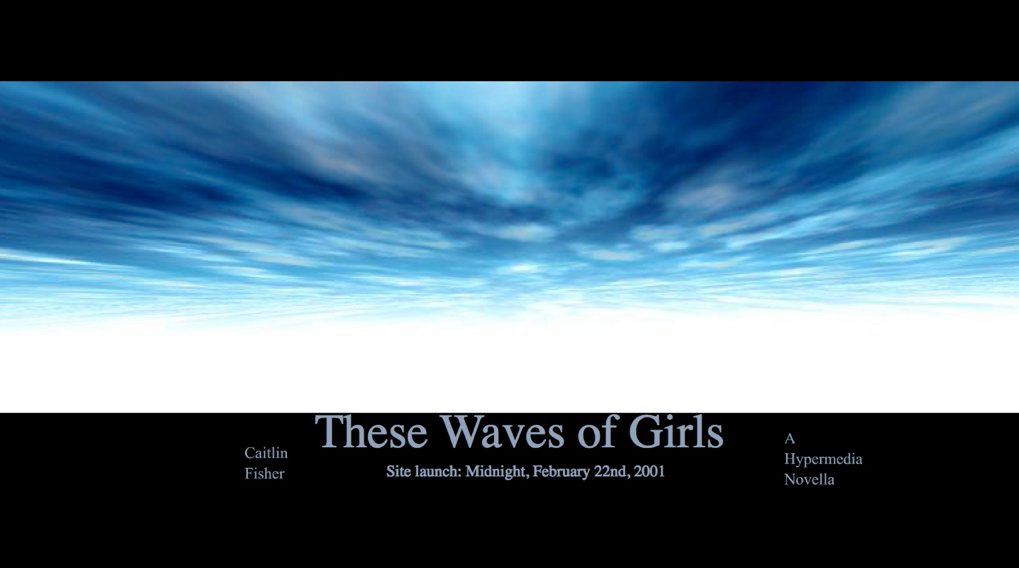
These Waves of Girls splash page

The Electronic Literature Organization awarded its fiction award to These Waves of Girls in 2001. Larry McCaffery, the award juror, wrote: "I found myself hooked on Waves from the moment I first logged on and watched Caitlin's gorgeous graphic interface assemble itself out of images of moving clouds drifting across the screen, mingling with the sounds of girls laughing." In the abstract for a critical review of Fisher's project, Raine Koskimaa writes, "These Waves is a class-room example of the so-called associative hypertext. The hypertextual structure is also closely linked to the problematics of autobiographical narration. As readers we get to ponder about the nature of remembering, of telling stories about one’s life. One of the genuine accomplishments of Fisher’s work is to bring forth these questions in a tangible, and still discreet, way."

These Waves of Girls is a foundational work of hypermedia and is widely studied at the university level in North America, Europe and Asia. The subject of many academic papers, the first thesis discussing the work was successfully defended in 2003. Selected in 2008 for publication by the Library of Congress as one of 300 global works of critical importance in the field, it was translated into Mandarin by researchers at Asia University.

The work is taught in undergraduate literature courses and is referenced in the scholarship as a highly influential example of early multimodal web-based hypertext fiction. Fisher is described as having "established herself at the forefront of digital writing" with These Waves of Girls (2001) and the augmented reality poem Andromeda (2008).

Fisher describes writing this work in response to the work of her dissertation and crafting it in opposition to that work: "Everything that I had put into the [hypertext, digital] dissertation, and all of the things that were extra-clever; the incredible cat’s-cradle of a million pieces of an incredibly complex thought sculpture [led to a decision] to do a character-driven, fiction, lyric [work]. I was just fortunate enough that I wrote a work that got a lot of attention. I’m sure that was instrumental in terms of having access to the kind of job I have now in the Faculty of Fine Arts: to being able now to do theoretical work, to build software, to write fiction and poetry, and pull together all those parts of my life."

=== Andromeda ===
The Electronic Literature Collection Volume 2 describes Fisher's Andromeda, "Andromeda is both a physical children's book and a digital book with AR codes that needs to be read with the use of a webcam. The human reader shows the book to the machine, and the machine reads the code that is provided in the cards that are attached to the pop-ups. The human reader then sees on the screen what the computer has in a sense translated into human languages. The complexity of reading and the double process of decoding is thus one of the more interesting and significant issues of the project. The use of a children's book in the project is significant because the symbolic process that takes place while reading the text is linked to the diegetic scene of a mother and a child reading a fairy tale."

=== Shadowpox ===
"Shadowpox: The Antibody Politic imagines the emergence of a vaccine-preventable disease composed of viral shadows. Part fact, part science fantasy, this mixed-reality installation combines real-world statistical data with theatrical simulation using motion-tracking, live-animated digital effects. The exhibition was reviewed in The Lancet and this piece was singled out for its impact: "...Of the remaining contributions, one of the most engaging is Shadowpox: The Antibody Politic, developed by Alison Humphrey, Caitlin Fisher, Steven J Hoffman, and Lalaine Destajo. This interactive installation quite literally renders visible the invisible, as participants must choose whether or not to be vaccinated against the 'shadowpox' pathogen, before having the opportunity to trace the impact of their decision as an animated population is exposed to the threat of infection. On completion, participants are able to view their 'infection collection' or 'protection collection', as the population is transformed from an aggregate statistic with a series of detailed individual stories. This is undoubtedly one of the most powerful and playful ways to illustrate both the individual and population-level implications of community immunity...."

== Awards ==
2020 Mourou-Strickland Fellow (Government of France)

2011 Shortlisted (1 of 5) for International New Media Writing Prize, UK. - An early version of Circle was shortlisted for the New Media Writing Prize in 2011.

2011 Jury Prize, ELO Circle

2009 Canada Research Chair in Digital Culture (renewal)

2008 International Digital Literature Prize "Ciutat de Vinaros" for Digital Poetry (co-awarded) - for Andromeda in the digital poetry category in 2008.

2001 International Electronic Literature Award for Fiction (ELO) for These Waves of Girls.

== Family ==
Caitlin Fisher is the daughter of poet Charles Fisher and the niece of artist and children's book author Wallace Edwards.
