= These Waves of Girls =

2001 hypermedia novella by Caitlin Fisher

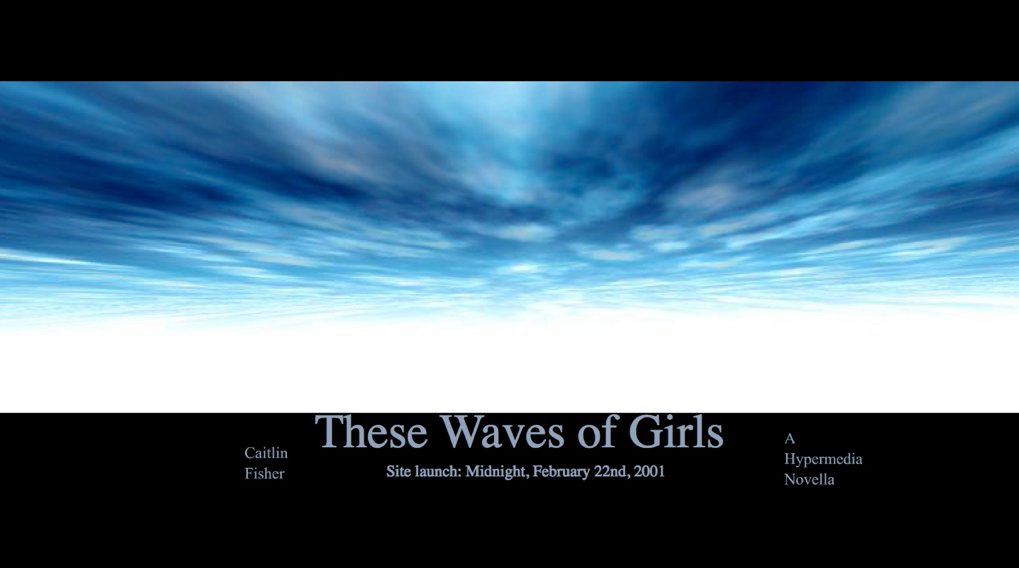
- Author: Caitlin Fisher
- Language: English
- Genres: Hypertext fiction, Electronic literature
- Publication date: February 22, 2001
- Publication place: Canada
- Media type: Web
- Award: 2001 ELO Award
- Website: https://www.yorku.ca/caitlin/waves/

These Waves of Girls is a hypermedia novella by Caitlin Fisher that won the Electronic Literature Organization's Award for Fiction in 2001. The work is frequently taught in undergraduate literature courses and is referenced in the field of electronic literature as a significant example of early multimodal web-based hypertext fiction, placing Fisher "at the forefront of digital writing".

== Plot ==
The plot of These Waves of Girls is described by Andreas Kitzmann as concerning "a young girl struggling with her sexual identity", while Raine Koskimaa describes the work as "a confessional autobiography about a girl coming to terms with her lesbian identity".

The "waves" of girls are "supposed to be about different moments in girlhood, different kinds of girls, different ways of discursively producing the girl. There are so many layers of stories of girls as victims, as victimisers, as cruel, as strong, as just so many different things at once", Fisher explained in a television interview in 2001.

== Narrative structure and interaction ==
=== Web-based hypertext ===
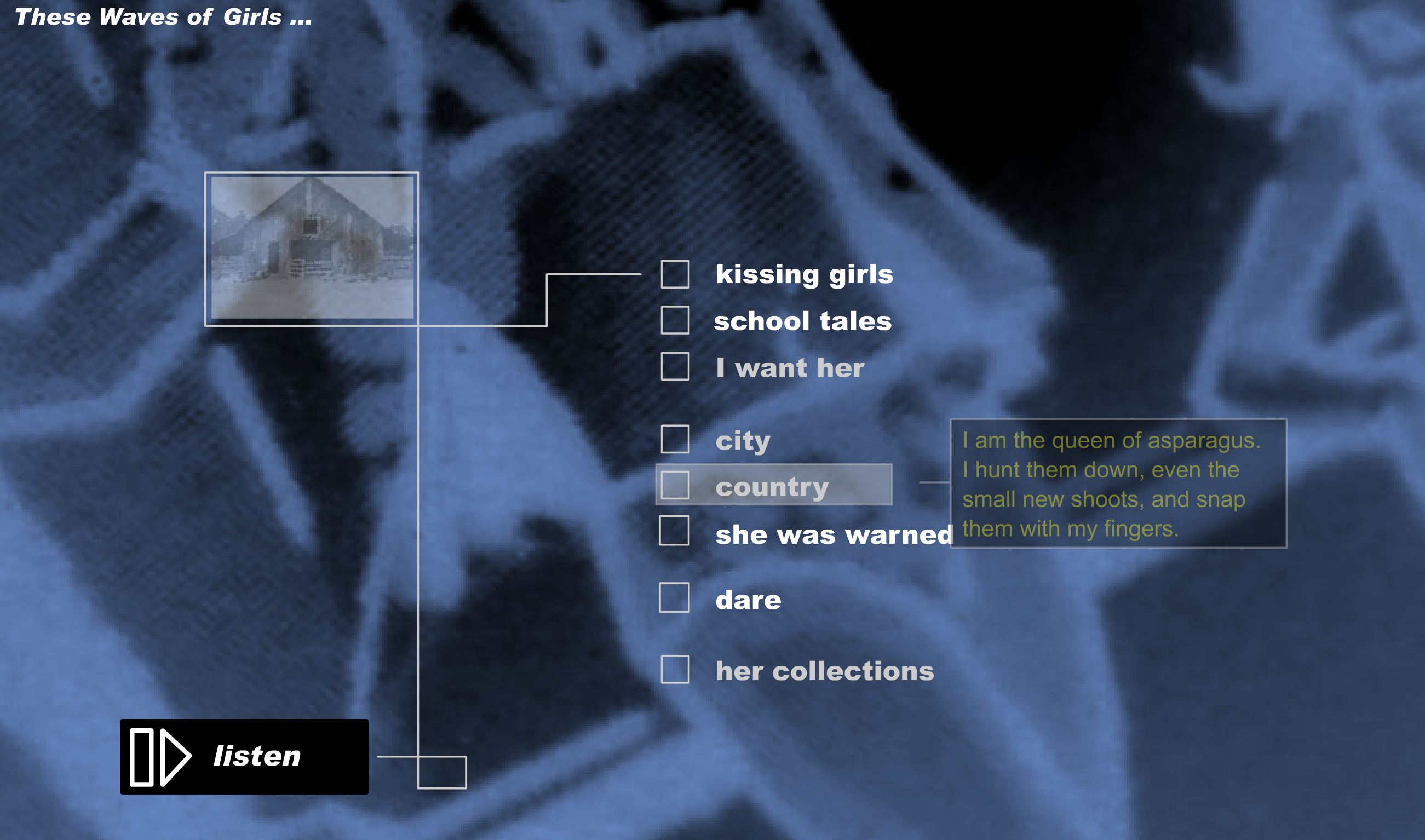
A table of contents allows the reader to choose which sections to visit.

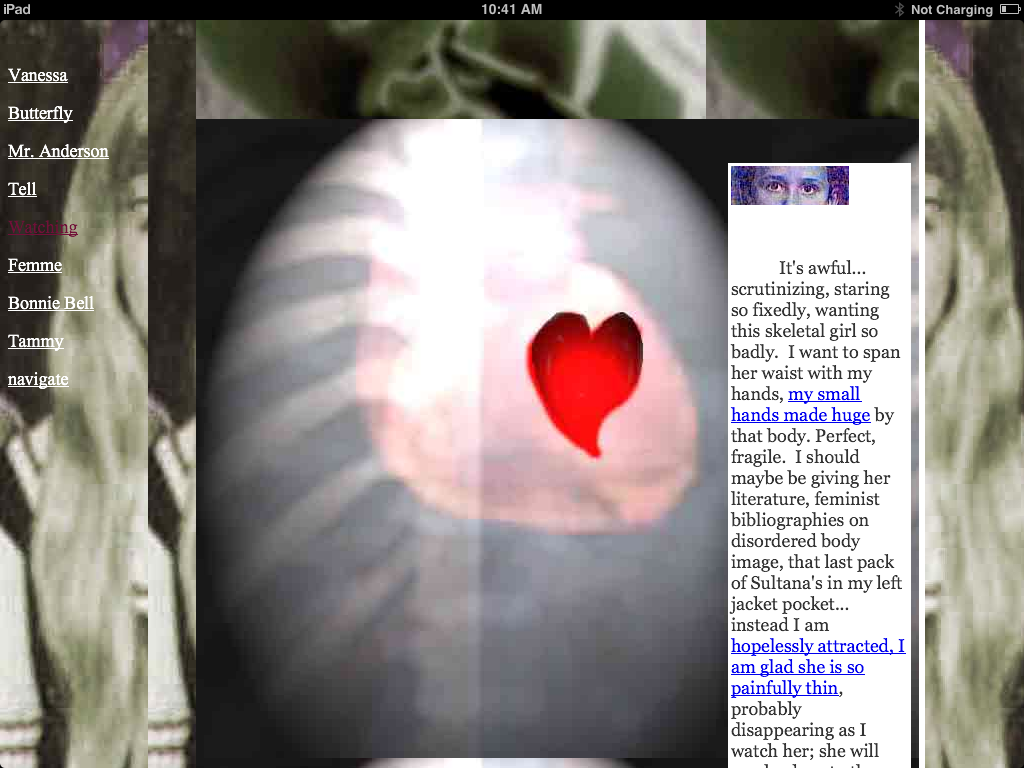
Excerpt showing a combination of text and images.

In an interview with TechTV immediately after receiving the ELO Award for These Waves of Girls, Fisher said the experience of writing with links and multiple modalities was exciting: "Writing in a hypertext environment, and working on the links as you're working on the writing, that becomes another way of writing - I think there is a new grammar to hypermedia." However, she also noted that "what I love best about traditional writing, I could keep."

In 2001, publishing a story on the web was still fairly unusual. Koskimaa notes that this affects the experience of reading the work itself: "it situates itself in the huge docuverse of the Internet –even though there are no links from the work reaching outside of its self-contained whole, through the web browser functionality it is always just one click away from other documents in the Web".

George Landow in his 2006 textbook, Hypertext 3.0. explains that this work is link intensive and provides navigational links as well as semantic links within the text.

The hypertextual structure is what Koskimaa calls a textbook example of "associative hypertext". Larry McCaffery described the linking as working in "often surprising ways that establish hidden connections that often seem to be operating on the basis of emotional, associational logic".

=== Multimodal hypertext ===
These Waves of Girls "effectively integrates visual and audio material into a nonlinear hypertext where the reader actively determines the process of the reading experience". The integration of sound and visuals through a combination of HTML and Adobe Flash was new in 2001. Colours, images and sounds (like the laughter of girls at the beginning of the piece) are integral to the narrative. Koskimaa also notes that "[s]ome of the images are mildly interactive in a way that moving the cursor over them distorts the picture like it was 'squeezed'." Vertical and horizontal scrolling beyond the immediately visible part of the page in the browser are also utilised.

=== Autobiographical ===
Kitzmann writes that These Waves of Girls is "structured as a confessional autobiography that parallels, to some extent, the experience of someone reminiscing about childhood experiences while flipping through old photographs." This is a common way of structuring hypertext fictions, Kitzmann writes, because it is a familiar mode of storytelling that is often characterised by the storyteller's memories being triggered by "a variety of cues, such as old photographs, comments by listeners, and random daily events". Koskimaa also notes that the work uses an unreliable narrator, a familiar literary technique in fictional autobiographies.

=== Unpolished web design ===
This screenshot from These Waves of Girls shows the nested frames criticised by Anja Rau but seen as a "meaningful element in the work" by Raine Koskimaa.

The autobiographical framing is also visible in the slightly unpolished feel of the web design. Anja Rau has criticised this in her "beta-test" of the work, where she argues that the use of frames, Flash and the embedding of sound is done in a way that "does not meet the technological standards of current internet or CD-ROM productions." In an analysis of how people read electronic literature based on teaching the works in undergraduate and Masters level classes, James Pope noted that all students reading These Waves of Girls commented "that the interface design was messy and confusing, with cluttered layout, awkward navigation and nested frames creating very distracting pages".

Raine Koskimaa counters this argument, saying that the unpolished style "has to be taken as a conscious choice by the author". While nested frames would be unacceptable if following web design guidelines, they might "be a successful device in a hyperfictional context (..) We can interpret the instance of nested frames as a meaningful element in the work".

Larry McCaffery's description of the work in his role as judge of the fiction contest supports Koskimaa's interpretation that the unpolished web design is a meaningful narrative element. McCaffrey writes, "There is a raw energy and garish intensity to these visual features that perfectly captures the feel of childhood and adolescence."

In Digital Fiction and the Unnatural, Astrid Ensslin and Alice Bell note that another aspect making These Waves of Girls difficult to read is the way links are used: "words used as hyperlinks are not always immediately indicative of the destination lexias to which they lead, so that they can inhibit rather than empower readers in their role as link chooser."

=== Narrativity ===
Writing for the Bloomsbury Handbook of Electronic Literature, Daniel Punday argues that These Waves of Girls "locates narrativity within individual stages and sections, but eschew(s) narrative progression through these stages." Like Koskimaa, Sunday sees the structure of These Waves of Girls as strongly connected to the aesthetic and culture of the web at the turn of the century. He writes, "Fisher's narrative exemplifies the way that early Web-based hypertext could tell a series of interrelated stories using a menu system that allows the reader to enter (and reenter) sections in any order. (..) [N]arrativity exists entirely within the stories narrated and alluded to within individual alexia; the overall menu structure of the text is unconnected to narrative progression."

== Reception ==
The Electronic Literature Organization awarded These Waves of Girls its fiction award in 2001. The judge, Larry McCaffery, wrote: "I found myself hooked on Waves from the moment I first logged on and watched Caitlin's gorgeous graphic interface assemble itself out of images of moving clouds drifting across the screen, mingling with the sounds of girls laughing." Despite this excitement, writing in 2006, James Pope notes the apparent paradox that a work so highly thought of in the field of electronic literature, and about as popular a topic as teen sexuality, "remains 'stuck' in a sort of twilight zone, apparently known only to a few insiders".

The work is frequently taught in undergraduate literature courses and is referenced in the scholarship as a highly influential example of early multimodal web-based hypertext fiction. Fisher is described as having "established herself at the forefront of digital writing" with These Waves of Girls and the augmented reality poem Andromeda (2008).
