= Neil Fraistat =

American academic and digital humanist

- Awards: Fredson Bowers Memorial Prize, Keats-Shelley Association Prize

Academic background
- Education: University of Pennsylvania (Ph.D.)

Academic work
- Discipline: English literature, Digital humanities
- Sub-discipline: Romanticism, Textual scholarship
- Institutions: University of Maryland, College Park
- Notable works: The Complete Poetry of Percy Bysshe Shelley

Neil R. Fraistat is an American academic, literary scholar, and digital humanist. He is professor emeritus of English at the University of Maryland, College Park and is known for his contributions to Romantic literature, textual scholarship, and digital humanities.

== Early life and education ==
Fraistat earned his Ph.D. in English from the University of Pennsylvania, where he specialized in Romanticism, textual studies, and digital humanities.

== Academic career ==
Fraistat is the co-general editor of The Complete Poetry of Percy Bysshe Shelley, an eight-volume critical edition, and co-editor of Shelley's Poetry and Prose (Norton Critical Edition). He was a co-founder and general editor of the Romantic Circles website, a key digital resource for scholars of Romanticism. He is the general editor of Shelley-Godwin Archive, which focuses on digital editions of manuscripts from the Shelley and Godwin families.

Fraistat was the director of the Maryland Institute for Technology in the Humanities (MITH) for twelve years, where he fostered interdisciplinary research in digital humanities. He co-founded and co-chaired centerNet, an international network of digital humanities centers, and served as Chair of the Alliance of Digital Humanities Organizations (ADHO).

He has published extensively in journals such as PMLA, Studies in Romanticism, Digital Humanities Quarterly, and Literary and Linguistic Computing.

== Professional involvement ==
Fraistat has served as President and Vice President of the Keats-Shelley Association of America. He has been actively involved in the advisory councils of organizations such as the Association for Computers and the Humanities, Project MUSE, the Society for Textual Scholarship, and NINES (Networked Infrastructure for Nineteenth-Century Electronic Scholarship). Additionally, he has served on the editorial boards of journals including Studies in Romanticism, Keats-Shelley Journal, Romanticism, Literary and Linguistic Computing, and Romanticism and Victorianism on the Net.

== Awards and recognition ==
Fraistat's scholarly contributions have been recognized with numerous awards, including:

- Fredson Bowers Memorial Prize and Richard J. Finneran Prize from the Society for Textual Scholarship.
- Keats-Shelley Association Prize and Distinguished Scholar Award from the Keats-Shelley Association of America.
- University of Maryland’s Kirwan Faculty Research and Scholarship Prize.
- Honorable mention for the Modern Language Association’s Distinguished Scholarly Edition Prize.

== Publishing ==
He has authored or edited eleven books, including:

- The Poem and the Book: Interpreting Collections of Romantic Poetry.
- The Complete Poetry of Percy Bysshe Shelley (8-volume edition, co-general editor).
- Shelley’s Poetry and Prose (Norton Critical Edition, co-editor).
- Reimagining Textuality: Textual Studies in the Late Age of Print (co-editor).
- The “Prometheus Unbound” Notebooks.
- The Cambridge Companion to Textual Scholarship (co-editor).
