= Everest Pipkin =

American artist

Everest Pipkin is an American drawing, game, and software artist who works with networks and internet spaces.

== Education ==
Pipkin graduated from Westlake High School in 2008, studied on a Young Masters grant at the Art Academy of San Francisco and Paris American Academy and finished by receiving a BFA at the University of Texas and an MFA at Carnegie Mellon University. Pipkin also studied and teaches at the School for Poetic Computation.

== Work ==
Pipkin makes drawings, computational artwork, generative poetry and other software, including games.

From 2011 to 2013, Pipkin ran Wardenclyffe Gallery, an Austin multidisciplinary art space. In 2013, Pipkin was a part of exhibitions at Greyduck Gallery, The Texas Biennial, and Fusebox Festival. From 2014 to 2015, Pipkin was the Gallery Director at The Museum of Human Achievement, a community driven arts space, where they curated group shows and events.

In 2015, Pipkin exhibited work at Babycastles, Now Play This Festival, and the Electronic Literature Organization. In 2016, Pipkin contributed to the art game anthology Triennale Game Collection with the piece The Worm Room, using images from the Biodiversity Heritage Library. Their Twitterbot project Moth Generator was a finalist for Beazley Design of the Year 2016.

In 2020 Pipkin created a tool called "Image Scrubber" in response to Black Lives Matter protests that allowed protesters to blur out faces and remove metadata from their images, this tool became widely used during the movement to protect protesters' safety. That same year they also created Lacework, a video cycle that looks at the conditions of production of artificial neural networks, and Shell Song, an interactive audio narrative game that explores deepfake voice technologies and the data sets behind them.

Since 2021 Pipkin has been working primarily in video games, with a focus on artist tools, hyperlinks, and ecology. In 2022 they released the idle clicker game The Barnacle Goose Experiment, which was followed up by the solar-powered point and click adventure Drift Mine Satellite in 2023. Their tabletop role playing games The Ground Itself and World Ending Game are about creating and ending stories, respectively. Pipkin is currently developing an unannounced eco‑horror mystery game set on a generation ship, a long‑term project they have described as their most ambitious work to date.

== Awards ==
As an undergraduate student, Pipkin was named All State Artist by the Texas Art Education Association. In 2012, Pipkin won Artist of the Year - Early Career in the Austin Visual Arts Awards. Pipkin was a Hunting Art Prize finalist in 2015 and 2016. Pipkin has completed residencies at MASS MoCA, the Media Archeology Lab, Galveston Artist Residency, Signal Culture, and Squeaky Wheel. They received a NYU Game Center No Quarter Commission in 2023, and won the Robert Coover Prize in Electronic Literature 2023 and the Chris Meade Memorial Main Prize from the New Media Writing Prize 2022 for their interactive poem Anonymous Animal.
