= Shan Shui (electronic literature) =

Shan Shui is an electronic literature work by Chen Qian Xun, first published in 2014, that combines background images with generative poetry. There are nine different background images in five different places on the page. When the reader clicks on the page, the background images change. At the same time, a poem will be appear in every click, the poem was made by re-ordering some of the character in a library that has 38 Chinese character and the to create as a new landscape.

== Origins and influences ==
Shan Shui's author, Chen Qian Xun, is a media artist and researcher who has traveled to many countries and is passionate about learning languages. She is passionate about studying digital technology and language to express art. Shan shui was her first work. This experimental work provided experience for her subsequent productions.

== Publication history ==
This work was originally published in CURA: A Literary Magazine of Art & Action, Issue 14, in Fall 2014. It was subsequently collected during the winter by Drunken Boat, an online literary journal. It was included in the Electronic Literature Organization Collection Volume 3 in 2016.

== Genre and programming ==
This digital work combines images and language with coding. The work used JavaScript and was published on a website. The poem is a generative one, wher the computer generates poems in Wujue (五绝), a format that provides four lines of five syllables following certain tonal constraints.

== Literary significance and critical reception ==
Licheng Xie in "If DeLillo was an E-Lit Writer: DeLillo's Language as Visual Art in the Digital Age" cites Shan Shui as an example to show the image features of natural language. Random arrangements of poems and background images are combined into a variety of meaningful landscape paintings, making the language part of the background image. He believes that this work highlights the relationship between language and image, and shows the "reshapable" characteristics of language in pictures.

In his essay "Beauty in code - 5 ways digital poetry combines human and computer languages", Author David Wright also use this work as an example in his visual verse. Poets have combined poetry and images for centuries. While poets of the past would use sculpture and poetry together, contemporary poets can use digital technology for the same purpose. shan shui is regarded as a symbol of the combination of poetry and digital coding.

Zijun Wang contents that the use of background images as part of the meaning of the piece qualify this piece as electronic poetry as well as computer-generated poetry.
