= Martha Nell Smith =

American professor

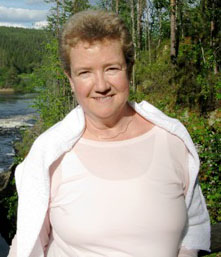
- Occupations: literary critic, professor
- Writing career
- Genre: literature

Martha Nell Smith is an American professor of English. She is a founding director of the Maryland Institute for Technology in the Humanities (MITH) at the University of Maryland, College Park. Her work's main focus is on the life and works of the poet Emily Dickinson.

== Career ==
A native of San Angelo, Texas, Smith is Coordinator and Executive Editor of the Dickinson Electronic Archives projects at the Institute for Advanced Technology in the Humanities (IATH) at the University of Virginia. With Lara Vetter, Smith is editor of Emily Dickinson’s Correspondence: A Born-Digital Textual Inquiry (2008) from the Mellon-sponsored Rotunda New Digital Scholarship, University of Virginia Press.

With teams at the University of Illinois, University of Virginia, University of Nebraska–Lincoln, University of Alberta, and Northwestern University, Smith worked on two interrelated Mellon-sponsored data mining and visualization initiatives, NORA and MONK (Metadata Offer New Knowledge). Smith also serves on the editorial board and steering committee of NINES (Networked Interface for Nineteenth-Century Electronic Scholarship), and is on the advisory board of the Poetess Archive.

Smith is President (and a director) of the Emily Dickinson International Society (EDIS).

In 2009, Livingston College at Rutgers University awarded Smith its Distinguished Alumni Award 2009 for scholarly achievement and leadership.

In May 2011, Smith was voted Chair-Elect of the University of Maryland Senate, and became Chair for the 2012–2013 term.

The recipient of numerous awards from the National Endowment for the Humanities (NEH), the American Council of Learned Societies (ACLS), the Mellon Foundation, and the Fund for the Improvement of Postsecondary Education (FIPSE) for her work on Dickinson, American literary history, and in new media, Smith is a founding board member of the Emily Dickinson International Society (EDIS), for which she has served as President since August 2013.

In 2012 Smith helped locate a photo believed to be of Dickinson, considered to be the only picture of the poet as an adult.

== Publications ==
Smith has published five books:

- Emily Dickinson, A User's Guide (2012) ISBN 978-1405147200
- Companion to Emily Dickinson (2008), coedited with Mary Loeffelholz ISBN 978-1405122801
- Open Me Carefully: Emily Dickinson’s Intimate Letters to Susan Dickinson (1998), coauthored with Ellen Louise Hart ISBN 978-0963818362
- Comic Power in Emily Dickinson (1993), coauthored with Cristanne Miller and Suzanne Juhasz ISBN 978-0292740297
- Rowing in Eden: Rereading Emily Dickinson (1992) ISBN 978-0292776661

She has also published more than 40 articles and essays in American Literature, Studies in the Literary Imagination, South Atlantic Quarterly, Women’s Studies Quarterly, Profils Americains, San Jose Studies, The Emily Dickinson Journal, ESQ, and A Companion to Digital Humanities.
