= Carolina Gainza =

Chilean researcher, sociologist, and politician

Carolina Olivia Gainza Cortés
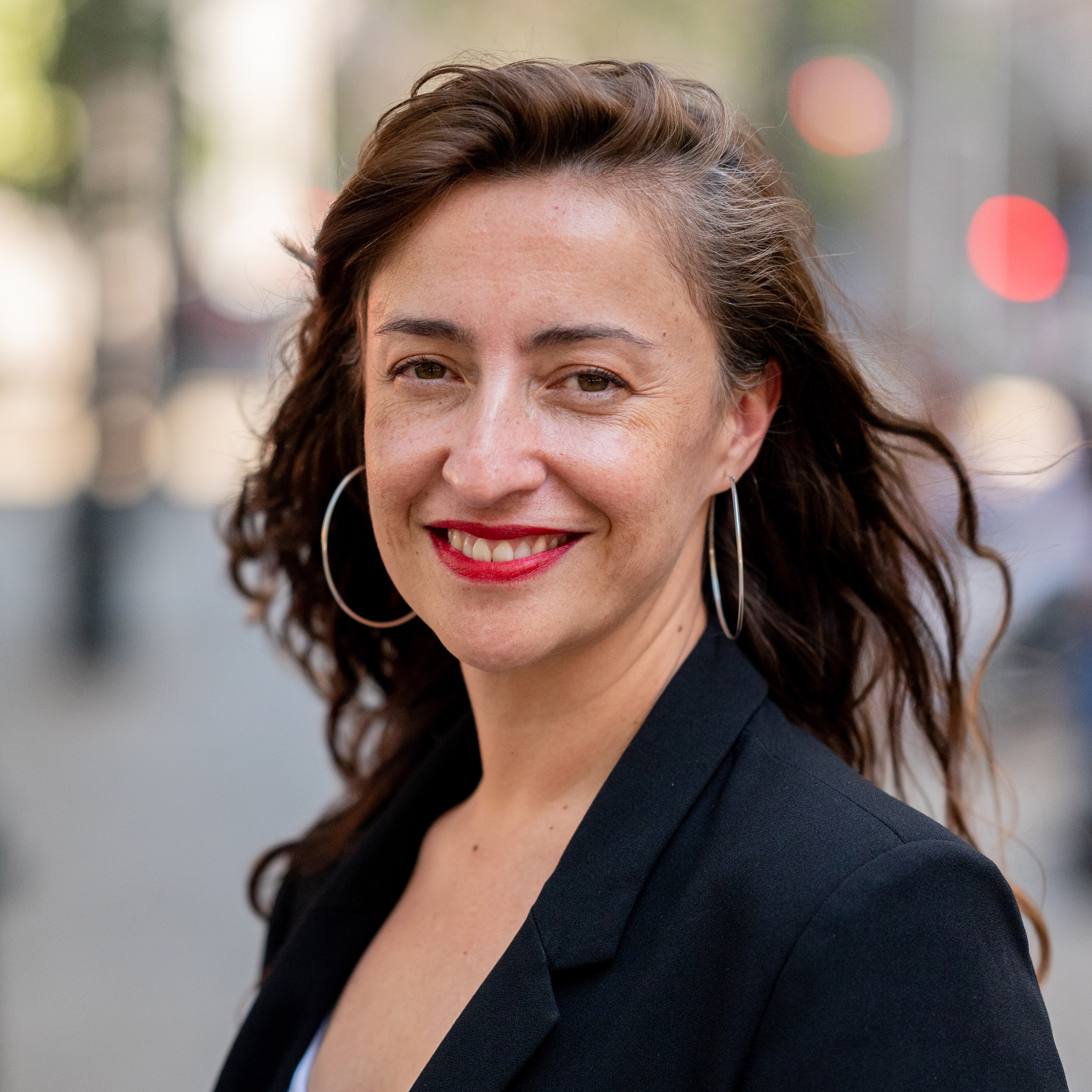
- Gainza in 2022
- Born: 29 March 1978 (age 48); Santiago, Chile
- Education: University of Chile; University of Pittsburgh
- Occupation: Professor
- Writing career
- Pen name: Carolina Gainza
- Genres: Electronic literature Chilean
- Subjects: Digital literature and sociology
- Notable works: Digital Narratives and Poetics in Latin America. Literary Production in Informational Capitalism, 2018
- Website: centroparalashumanidades.udp.cl/equipo/carolina-gainza/

Carolina Olivia Gainza Cortés (born 29 March 1978) is a Chilean researcher, sociologist, and politician. As a researcher for digital literature and culture in Latin America, she focuses on aesthetics, production, circulation and reception. As a Chilean sociologist and politician, she is a member of the Broad Front. She was Undersecretary of Science, Technology, Knowledge and Innovation of Chile under the government of President Gabriel Boric between March 2022 and November 2024.

== Life and education ==
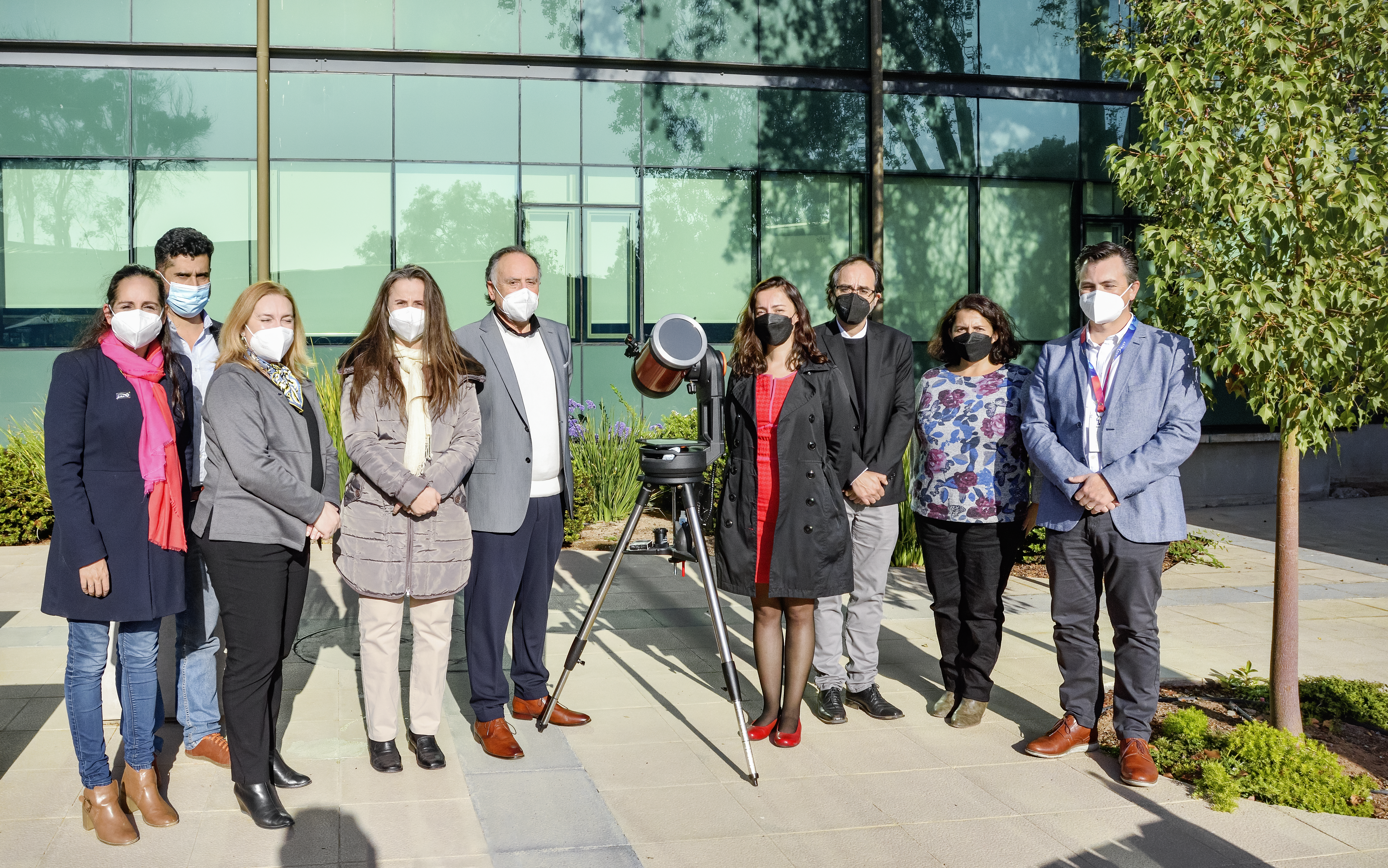
Carolina Gainza (Undersecretary of Science) and Jorge Soto (Seremi de la Macrozona Centro) with AURA staff at the AURA Recinto facility in La Serena, Chile, 28 July 2022

Cortés is one of four children of Pedro Gainza and Mirna Cortés. She completed her secondary education at Liceo No. 7 in Providencia. She completed a master's degree in Latin American studies as well as higher education studies in sociology at the University of Chile. She also earned a doctorate in Hispanic languages and literature from the University of Pittsburgh, United States. Her 2013 doctoral dissertation, "Escrituras Electrónicas en América Latina. Producción Literaria en el Capitalismo Informacional" (Electronic Writing in Latin America: Literary Production in Informational Capitalism), was supervised by Juan Duchesne.

== Political career ==
She was a member of the Convergencia Social (CS) party and has been a founding member of the Frente Amplio since its founding in 2024. In February 2022, she was appointed by then-president-elect Gabriel Boric as head of the Undersecretary of Science, Technology, Knowledge and Innovation from 11 March 2022, with the formal start of the administration, until 6 November 2024. In this position, she was instrumental in creating a gender unit, InES Género (Spanish: Innovación en Educación Superior Género), at the Pontifical Catholic University of Chile to help change university cultures and organizations to ensure that equity and equality are driving forces. She also led the development of Knowledge 2030, a ministry initiative to strengthen humanist, arts and social sciences research and development.

To promote the public role of research, she became a founding member of the Association of Researchers in Arts and Humanities and was a board member from 2017 to 2021.

== Electronic literature career ==
Gainza specializes in digital literature, digital culture, Latin American cultural studies, cultural sociology, and literary theory. She has been described as "one of the most important pioneers of Luso-Hispanic Digital Cultural Studies".

She was an associate professor at the Escuela de Literatura Creativa (School of Creative Literature) at the Universidad Diego Portales, Santiago, Chile) and began her role as associate professor in the Facultad de Comunicación y Letras (Faculty of Communication and Letters) in January 2025. Gainza directed the Fondect project "Critical Cartography of Latin American Digital Literature" (2018-2021). She was also a co-researcher in "From Modernism to Digital: Technology in Latin American Literature in the 20th and 21st Centuries" at Youngstown State University from 2017 to 2019 and participated in the international networking project "Digital Culture: Crossroads between Narratives, Art and Technology" from 2018 to 2019.

In 2021, Gainza worked with academic Carolina Zúñiga (Diego Portales University) to create the Digital Culture Laboratory at Diego Portales University and developed the "Cartography of Latin American Digital Literature", an infrastructure used by many scholars. The 2021 "Cartography of Latin American Digital Literature" won second runner up in the "Best DH Data Visualization" category at the 2021 Digital Humanities Awards.

She directed the Revista Lab from 2013 to 2018 and curated an exhibition of Chilean digital works at the 13th Media Arts Biennial in 2017.

Gainza is a member of the Literary Advisory Board for the Electronic Literature Organization.

== Selected works ==
=== Books ===
- Narrativas y poéticas digitales en América Latina. Santiago: Editorial Cuarto Propio, 2018 ISBN 9563960300.
- Cartografía Crítica de la Literatura Digital Latinoamericana. Sao Carlos: EDUFSCar, 2023 ISBN 9788576006053.

=== Articles ===
- "Emerging literary fields: Digital Literature in Latin America" (Spanish: "Campos literarios emergentes: literatura digital en América Latina"), Estudios avanzados 2014, which analyzes two Latin American digital works: Word Toys by Belén Gache and Jaime Alejandro Rodríguez's Gabriella Infinita.
- "Networks of Collaboration & Creation in Latin America", a research article that examines the changes that digital technology has brought to Latin American literature, 2017
