= Dickinson Electronic Archives =

Website devoted to the study of Emily Dickinson

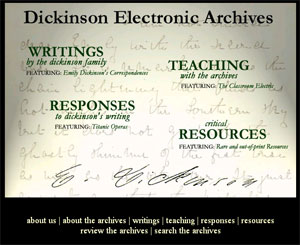

The Dickinson Electronic Archives (DEA) is a website devoted to the study of Emily Dickinson, her writing practices, writings directly influencing her work, and critical and creative writings generated by her work. The DEA contains a collection of manuscripts, a scholarly journal as well as a forum for users. It is an open-access archive, available to all users. One of the primary missions of the Dickinson Electronic Archives is to enhance knowledge surrounding Emily Dickinson, through the contextual clues of her creative process as discovered in her manuscripts.

The original archives are now archived electronically and the current site is known as the Dickinson Electronic Archives 2.

== History ==
The Dickinson Electronic Archives began in 1994 by Emily Dickinson scholar and University of Maryland, College Park professor Martha Nell Smith. It was the first online digital repository of its kind and featured a limited number of Dickinson manuscripts and correspondences.

In 2000, the DEA received its first major overhaul. This overhaul included the additions of more manuscripts and correspondences, as well as Titanic Operas – a section highlighting the responses of contemporary poets to Emily Dickinson – and a section of the DEA dedicated to helping teachers utilize digital resources in classroom instruction. Although originally created to showcase the writings of and scholarship concerning American poet Emily Dickinson, the Dickinson Electronic Archives projects have since expanded to include as well the writings of Emily Dickinson's correspondents, many of whom were family members such as Susan Dickinson and nephew Edward Dickinson. The DEA also features Dickinson’s manuscripts, both poetic manuscripts and letters, as well as detailed scholastic analysis by various authors.
