= Amaranth Borsuk =

American poet and educator

- Born: 1981 (age 44–45)

Academic background
- Education: University of California Los Angeles (BA, 2003); University of Southern California (MA, 2006; PhD, 2010)
- Thesis: Machines Made of Words: Poets, Technology, and the Mediation of Subjectivity (2010)
- Doctoral advisor: Susan McCabe
- Website: amaranthborsuk.com

Amaranth Borsuk (born 1981) is an American poet and educator known for her experiments with textual materiality and digital poetry. She is an associate professor at the University of Washington Bothell's School of Interdisciplinary Arts & Sciences, where she teaches undergraduate courses on poetry and experimental writing. She is also a faculty member of the school's M.F.A. program in creative writing.

== Life ==
Borsuk was born in Meriden, Connecticut. She is fluent in English, French, and Hebrew.

Borsuk holds a B.A. in English from the University of California, Los Angeles, and an M.A. in English literature and Ph.D. in literature and creative writing from the University of Southern California.

Borsuk was a Mellon Postdoctoral Fellow in the Humanities at the Massachusetts Institute of Technology.

She has been married to software developer Brad Bouse since 2013, and the couple have one daughter.

== Works ==
Her work includes poetry (Handiwork, Tonal Saw, Pomegranate Eater), artist books, and collaborative digital projects (Abra, As We Know, Whispering Galleries, Between Page and Screen), and she has a special interest in investigating textual materiality.

Her 2013 collaboration with Jesper Juul and Nick Monfort, The Deletionist, erases texts on a web screen to leave words that then form another poem by themselves, exploring themes of overwriting and erasure.

Between Page and Screen (Siglio, 2012) by Borsuk and Brad Bouse is a 2012 project that incorporates both a paper book and digital art. The paper book does not contain words but instead a series of geometric patterns. Readers use a webcam to have the text appear above the book. Laura Shackleford explains that this work renders "tangible the transactional spaces between print and language practices."

Whispering Galleries (2014) by Borsuk and Brad Bouse is a 2014 site-specific, interactive, multimedia poetry project that uses the reader's gestures to transform a local diary into erasure poetry on the screen. As readers gesture over the computer, transcriptions from a diary dissolve, leaving behind a poem. Through a webcam, the participant's shadow emerges behind the words, creating a symbolic link between the viewer and the work.

Whispering Galleries was commissioned by Site Projects, a nonprofit that supports artistic works. The project was also supported by the New Haven Free Public Library and the Arts Council of Greater New Haven. Originally displayed at the New Haven Free Public Library on April 26, 2014, it was later exhibited at The Institute Library in New Haven (2014), the International Symposium on Electronic Art at Simon Fraser University in Vancouver (2015), and "You/I: Interfaces & Reader Experience" at the Paul Watkins Gallery at Winona State University (2016).

ABRA (2016) by Borsuk, Kate Durbin, and Ian Hatcher was created under a National Endowment for the Arts-funded Expanded Artists’ Books Grant from the Center for Book and Paper Arts at Columbia College Chicago.

The Book explains the history of books as media and explores the relationships between authors, readers, and publishers.

== Prizes ==
- Gulf Coast Poetry Prize, 2011, for "A New Vessel"
- Slope Editions Book Prize, 2011, for Handiwork

== See also ==
- List of electronic literature authors, critics, and works
- Digital poetry
- Electronic literature
- Hypertext fiction
- Interactive fiction
- Literatronica
