= Cultural analytics =

Quantified study of social practices

Cultural analytics refers to the use of computational, visualization, and big data methods for the exploration of contemporary and historical cultures. While digital humanities research has focused on text data, cultural analytics has a particular focus on massive cultural data sets of visual material – both digitized visual artifacts and contemporary visual and interactive media. Taking on the challenge of how to best explore large collections of rich cultural content, cultural analytics researchers developed new methods and intuitive visual techniques that rely on high-resolution visualization and digital image processing. These methods are used to address both the existing research questions in humanities, to explore new questions, and to develop new theoretical concepts that fit the mega-scale of digital culture in the early 21st century.

== History ==
The term "cultural analytics" was coined by Lev Manovich in 2007. After 2016, this term started to be increasingly used by other researchers, and many university programs in cultural analytics were gradually established. Journal of Cultural Analytics started to be published in 2016. Manovich's own monograph Cultural Analytics is being published by The MIT Press in the fall of 2020.

Cultural analytics shares many ideas and approaches with visual analytics ("the science of analytical reasoning facilitated by visual interactive interfaces") and visual data analysis:

Visual data analysis blends highly advanced computational methods with sophisticated graphics engines to tap the extraordinary ability of humans to see patterns and structure in even the most complex visual presentations. Currently applied to massive, heterogeneous, and dynamic datasets, such as those generated in studies of astrophysical, fluidic, biological, and other complex processes, the techniques have become sophisticated enough to allow the interactive manipulation of variables in real time. Ultra high-resolution displays allow teams of researchers to zoom in to examine specific aspects of the renderings, or to navigate along interesting visual pathways, following their intuitions and even hunches to see where they may lead. New research is now beginning to apply these sorts of tools to the social sciences and humanities as well, and the techniques offer considerable promise in helping us understand complex social processes like learning, political and organizational change, and the diffusion of knowledge.

While increased computing power and technical developments allowing for interactive visualization have made the exploration of large data sets using visual presentations possible, the intellectual drive to understand cultural and social processes and production pre-dates many of these computational advances. Charles Joseph Minard's famous dense graphic showing Napoleon's March on Moscow (1869) offers a 19th-century example. Published in 1979, Pierre Bourdieu's historical survey of the cultural consumption practices of mid-century Parisians, documented in La Distinction, foregrounds the study of culture and aesthetics through the lens of large data sets. Most recently, Franco Moretti's Graphs, maps, trees: abstract models for a literary history (published in 2005) along with many projects in the Digital Humanities reveal the benefit of large scale analysis of cultural material.

== Current research ==
To date, cultural analytics techniques have been applied to user-generated content, films, animations, video games, comics, magazines, books, artworks, photographs, and a variety of other media content. The technologies used for analyzing and exploring large visual collections range from open-source programs that run on any personal computer to supercomputer processing and large-scale displays such as the HIPerSpace (42,000 x 8000 pixels).

== Methodologies ==
The methodologies used in cultural analytics includes the data mining of large sets of culturally-relevant data (such as studies of library catalogs, image collections, and social networking databases), statistics, exploratory data analysis, and machine learning. Image processing of still and moving video, with feature recognition as well as image data extraction is used to support research into cultural and historical change. Cultural analytical methodologies are deployed to study and interpret video games and other software forms, both at the phenomenological level (human–computer interface, feature extraction) or at the object level (the analysis of source code.)

Cultural analytics relies heavily on software-based tools, and the field is related to the nascent discipline of software studies. While the objects of a cultural analytical approach are often digitized representations of the work, rather than the work in its original material form, the objects of study need not be digital works in themselves.

== Related methodologies ==
Related methodologies include:

- Culturomics
- Cultural analysis
- Information visualization
- Visual analytics
- Data visualization
- Data mining
- New media art
- Software studies
- Digital humanities
- Data science
