= Adeena Karasick =

Canadian poet, performance artist, and essayist

Adeena Karasick (born June 1, 1965) is a Canadian poet, performance artist, and essayist. Born in Winnipeg of Russian Jewish heritage, she is the author of 13 books of poetry and poetic theory, as well as a series of parodic videopoems, such as the ironic "I Got a Crush on Osama" that was featured on Fox News and screened at film festivals, Ceci n'est pas un Téléphone or Hooked on Telephonics: A Pata-philophonemic Investigation of the Telephone created for The Media Ecology Association, "Lingual Ladies" a post-modern parody of Beyoncé's "Single Ladies", and "This is Your Final Nitrous" a poetic response to the Burning Man Festival, and White Abbot, a parodic videopoem Karasick created during the writing of Salome: Woman of Valor, dedicated to the impossible anguish of forbidden love.

Karasick's most recent publications include Ærotomania Flight Deck (NuJu Books, New York, 2023), Ærotomania: The Book of Lumenations (Lavender Ink, New Orleans, 2023), Ouvert: Oeuvre: Openings (Lavender Ink, New Orleans, 2023), and Massaging the Medium: Seven Pechakuchas (Institute for General Semantics Press, Language in Action, Forest Hills, NY, 2022; shortlisted for International Outstanding Book Award, ICA, 2023). Notable awards include for her books: House that Hijack Built, which received a Canadian Department of Foreign Affairs and International Trade Award in 2005, Dyssemia Sleaze, which was honoured with a Bumbershoot Festival Award for Most Adventurous Publication, This Poem, which opened on The Globe and Mail Bestseller List for Winnipeg and was named one of the Top Five Poetry Books of 2012 by The Jewish Daily Forward, Amuse Bouche: Tasty Threats for the Mouth, which won the 2009 International Best Book Awards.

Additionally, Karasick was the recipient of the Andrew W. Mellon Foundation Award the Voce Donna Italia Award for her contributions to feminist thinking in 2016 and a Professional Writers Award from the Canada Council of the Arts in 2010, 2012, and 2016. She received a 2009 Department of Foreign Affairs, Trade and Development Act travel grant to Paris and Canada, as well as awards to perform through India, London, Las Vegas, Florida, Minnesota, and Romania. In 2008, she was endowed with the MPS Mobile Award for being the world's first mobile poet.

Dr. Karasick's books are known for having an urban, feminist aesthetic, which is infused with a collage of academic and pop cultural idioms. Her urban, Jewish feminist mashups have been described as "electricity in language" by Nicole Brossard and noted for their "cross-fertilization of punning and knowing, theatre and theory" by Charles Bernstein. Her books have been received as both poetry and hybrid-genre essays on writing and interpretive technologies and have been used by both English and Media Studies departments in colleges across the United States and abroad.

Receiving much critical acclaim and international media attention over the years for her work, Dr. Karasick has been featured in more than 120 interviews on European and Indian television and radio as well as South Asian, European, Canadian and United States press. Her work has also been featured in a wide variety of national and international journals and anthologies, literary magazines and blog sites and "inserts itself amongst the corpus of texts that are changing, and being changed by, contemporary pedagogies" (Canadian Literature); "proto-ecstatic jet-propulsive word torsion" that "jolt[s] us from zoning out in our comfort zones, challenging our notion of what poetry is, or could be."

Her Spoken-Word opera, Salomé: Woman of Valor, which re-visions the apocryphal figure of Salomé through a feminist Jewish lens [merging poetry, history, theory, visual projections, modern dance and live music drawing from Klezmer bhangra and jazz traditions composed by Grammy Award winner, Frank London)], has been the subject of numerous reviews and university curricula. After a series of sold out preview presentations (at The Tribeca New Music Festival, DROM, Pratt Institute and at The Stone), the opera debuted in Canada at the Chutzpah! Festival in Vancouver, Spring 2018, at The Ashkenaz Festival in Toronto, Sept. 2018 and at the Oberon Theater in Boston, March 2019. The libretto has received international recognition, having been translated into Italian (by Pina Piccolo and Serena Piccolo) and published in Italy by University of Padova Press and also an English-only Limited edition Artist Book with Gap Riot Press in Toronto, 2018. Sections have been translated in to Bengali, German, Arabic and Yiddish.

Karasick's Salomé has been described as "the 'dance of the intellect among words'. One long dithyramb of desire, a seven-veiled dance of seduction that celebrates the tangles, convolutions, and ecstacies of unbridled sexuality....Not so much by talking about desire as by demonstrating how desire flows through language, an unstoppable flood of allusion (both literary and pop-cultural), word-play, and extravagant and outrageous sound-work." (Plume)

She has presented over 600 public lectures and performances, throughout Canada, US, France, Italy, Prague, Italy, London, Morocco and India – performing both with her band and a capella: in Padova, Cesena, Venice: at the Poetry and Sister Arts International Festival / Festival internazionalee di poesia e arti sorelle, Cesena FC, Italia, at the Awards Ceremony Poetry Reading and Best Literary Criticism Award ceremony (LILEC – Dipartimento di Lingue), Letterature e Culture Moderne, University of Bologna, at the Museo Ebraico di Padua / Jewish Museum of Padova, at the Museo Ebraico di Venezia / Jewish Museum of Venice, Campo di Ghetto Novo in Venice, and at the Centro di Poesia Contemporanea dell'Università di Bologna / Verse 61, in Bologna, Italy; in New York at The Players Club for The Institute of General Semantics and Media Ecology Association, International Communication Association conference in Marrakech at the Festival of the Prose Poem, Al Hamra Center for Culture and Thought. Marrakesh, Morocco; at the DIGITAL EngAGEment conference at Brooklyn College hosted by the Dept. of Radio and Television; at the Subterranean Annual Subterranean Poetry Festival, The Widow Jane Mine in Rosendale NY; KlezKanada Festival of Jewish Music and Culture in Lantier Quebec, the Boston Poetry Marathon, in Cambridge, Mass, at the 25th Anniversary for the Association for Jewish Studies conference and in India at the National Academy of Letters at Sahitya Akademi Conference Hall, University of New Delhi; at Jadavpur University as part of Forum on Identity, Border and Nation, Prayukti Bhawan in Jadavpur, Kolkata; the Lions Club Auditorium, Deshopriya Park, Kolkata, India and Kolkata Nandan, West Bengal Film Center, for Baschimbanga Kobita Akademi sponsored by the Government of West Bengal, Kolkata, in honor of her contributions to Post-Colonial Literature, (and at Simon Fraser University at the Bennet Library, Special Collections, to celebrate the acquisition of her archive, with a full display of the 27 boxes of materials.

In addition to her career as both an educator and writer, Karasick has been an active multimedia art practitioner who has created and directed word-acclaimed video poems and pechakuchas that have been featured at festivals, conferences, classrooms and screens worldwide. These cross-genre performances, books, videos and pechakuchas have established her as a powerful force in Canadian and American Literature. According to Book Expo America, recognizing her as being "the future of E-Books" (Kathleen Sweeney): "she [is] opening up the possibilities for re-visioning language as a performance, as theatre, and how that language, with all its power and sublimity, its (in)finite permutation and combination, is inseparable from our lives."

In 2022, her collected pechakuchas were released as a book length, entitle Massaging the Medium: Seven Pechakuchas by the Institute of General Semantics Press. According to Johanna Drucker, "Adeena Karasick's high-powered cultural insights [coupled] with the sheer scale of her inventory of references is enough to overwhelm the synapses and explode the constellationary possibilities of trying to process the world we live in…mordantly clever these compressed works are full of edge and insight. Up-to-date and totally timely, the dense fields of text-image resonate with current associations and indexical trails of the familiar frames according to which we mediate the culturally produced encounters with our daily lives. Accurate and terrifying, lively and vivid, Adeena Karasick's format manages its hybrid pata-para-pechakucha parametrics with dizzying and dazzling energy and skill. In other words—WOW". In 2023, the book was shortlisted for an Outstanding Book Award by the International Communication Association.

Dr. Karasick is a longtime member of the Institute for General Semantics, Writers' Union of Canada, the League of Canadian Poets, the Association of Writers & Writing Programs, the Modern Language Association, and the Association for Jewish Studies and the Media Ecology Association, among multiple other professional societies. She notably served as founding co-editor of Anerca / com.post: Journal of Avant-Garde Poetry and Poetics (1985-1989), annotated in "To Breathe Poetry Among The Neighbours: Two Essays on Anerca, a Journal of Experimental Writing (1985-1990)" and since 2015 has been serving as Poetry Editor for Explorations in Media Ecology, an international journal dedicated to extending our understanding of media and media environments through diverse theoretical (philosophical, aesthetic, literary, historical, psychological, sociological, anthropological, political, economic, scientific) and methodological approaches.

Dr. Karasick grew up in Vancouver, British Columbia, studied with Warren Tallman at the University of British Columbia in Vancouver, Canada, where she earned a Bachelor of English in 1988. Relocating to Toronto, she began working with famed feminist theorist and semiotician, Barbara Godard, performing with various poets including internationally acclaimed concrete and sound artists bill bissett and bpNichol. After completing a Master of Arts at York University in 1990, she earned a Doctor of Philosophy in Kabbalistic Hermeneutics, Feminist Theory and Deconstruction, at Concordia University in Montreal, Canada in 1997. Her Ph.D. dissertation, "Of Poetik Thinking: A 'Pataphysical Investigation of Cixous, Derrida and the Kabbalah" resulted in a close friendship with Jacques Derrida, establishing Dr. Karasick as the Kabbalah Kohenet (High Priestess), morah (teacher) and scholar of Kabbalah (Kabbalah Fractals Project).

She is a five time Andrew W. Mellon Foundation Award recipient, winner of the 2017 Voce Donna Italia award for her contributions to feminist thinking and in 2019, she received an Albert Nelson, Marquis Lifetime Achievement Award, and is presently Poet Laureate for the Institute of General Semantics.

== Education ==
Karasick received her Ph.D., in 1997 from Concordia University in Montreal and was the first interdisciplinary scholarship, which linked the work of French deconstructionist philosophy with 13th-century hermeneutics. Her doctoral dissertation, Of Poetic Thinking: A 'Pataphysical Investigation of Cixous, Derrida and the Kabbalah, examined the relationship between the major texts of Kabbalistic discourse and contemporary deconstructionist and literary practices.

== Teaching career ==
Karasick is a professor of Humanities and Media Studies at Pratt Institute teaching Literature and Critical Theory, Performance Art, and The Artists Book. From 2000 to 2012, she taught Global Literature at St. John's University and was an associate professor of communication and media theory at Fordham University. From 2012 to 2017, she was co-founding director of KlezKanada Poetry Festival and Retreat; between 2008 and 2010, Karasick taught writing and film and literature at the Borough of Manhattan Community College. In 2019, she taught a series of Masters Classes at the Brandeis Cultural Institute, Brandeis-Bardin Campus, Simi Valley, CA. Between 1991 and 1992, and from 1993 to 1996, Karasick taught Canadian contemporary literature and cultural theory at York University, Canada, and in 1992 was writer in residence at the Gutenberg Universität in Mainz, Germany.

== Bibliography ==
- The Empress Has No Closure (Talonbooks, 1992) ISBN 0889223076
- Mêmewars (Talonbooks, 1994) ISBN 0889223440
- Genrecide (Talonbooks, 1996) ISBN 088922370X
- Dyssemia Sleaze (Talonbooks, Spring 2000) ISBN 088922434X
- The Arugula Fugues (Zasterle Press, 2001) ISBN 8487467342
- The House That Hijack Built (Talonbooks, 2004) ISBN 0889225117
- Amuse Bouche: Tasty Treats for the Mouth (Talonbooks 2009) ISBN 0889226040
- This Poem (Talonbooks, 2012) ISBN 0889226997
- The Medium is the Muse: Channeling Marshall McLuhan co-edited with Lance Strate (NeoPoiesis Press, 2014) ISBN 0985557753
- Intersyllabic Weft, (co-authored with Maria Damon and Alan Sondheim), Moira Books, Chicago, 2017.
- Salomé: Woman of Valor / Salome: Donna Valarosa (in dual edition of English and Italian Translation, trans. Pina Piccolo and Serena Piccoli), University of Padova Press, CLEUP: Italy, 2017. ISBN 9788867877287
- Salomé: Woman of Valor (Libretto) GapRiot Press, Toronto, Spring 2018.
- Checking In, Talonbooks: Vancouver, 2018. ISBN 9781772012002
- Salomé: Woman of Valor, translation into Bengali (trans. Aritra Sanyal and Paulami Sengupta), Boibhashik Prokashoni Press, Kolkata, 2020.
- Massaging the Medium: Seven Pechakuchas. Institute for General Semantics Press, Language in Action, Forest Hills, NY, 2022. ISBN 9781970164145
- Ærotomania: The Book of Lumenations. Lavender Ink, Diálogos Books, New Orleans, LA, Spring, 2023. ISBN 978-1-956-92112-0
- Ærotomania Flight Deck. NuJu Books, New York, 2023. ISBN 9798886800111
- Ouvert Oeuvre: Openings, Lavender Ink, Diálogos, Books, New Orleans, LA, Spring, 2023. ISBN 9781956921137

== Projects and collaborations ==
Both her poetic and scholarly work focuses on issues of contemporary writing strategies, media, culture and aesthetics and has been described as "electricity in language." Nicole Brossard, "a twined virtuosity of mind and ear which leaves the reader deliciously lost in Karasick's signature 'syllabic labyrinth.'" Craig Dworkin, "a delirious interplay of tongue twisting cacophony and serious exploration of language and meaning." Herizons, "plural, cascading, exuberant, in their cross fertilization of punning and knowing, theory and theatre", Charles Bernstein.

Her ongoing collaboration with Maria Damon, Intertextile: Text in Exile: Shmata Mash-Up, explores the interwoven relationship between gender and textuality and debuted at The Banff Centre for the Arts and The Poets House in New York.

Her study of the Kabbalistic traces in Charles Bernstein's opera, Shadowtime and her ongoing work tracing the patterns and intersections between Kabbalah and Contemporary poetics ("Hijacking Language") were published in Radical Poetics and Secular Jewish Culture (University of Alabama Press, 2012). An analysis by Maria Damon of Karasick's own poetry also appears in the book. According to Jake Marmer, "Karasick is after the "meaning that is not fixed but in flux, fluid; a logic that is often illogical; a rationality that is not irrational but relational and affirms that like the text itself we must embrace contradiction, conflict, discordance."

A study of Kenny Goldsmith and conceptual poetry and its relation to 13th-century textual practices was presented at The Kelly Writer's House, University of Pennsylvania, as part of North of Invention: Festival of Canadian Poetry.

An investigation of the relationship between conceptual writing, media and pop culture, "Glammed Out, Googley-Eyed and Gangsta: Parody, Satire and Cultural Sampling in the Age of Media Obsession" was presented at the New Jersey Institute of Technology, 2011.

Her work on the language and locus of Marshall McLuhan includes "In My Blogal Village, Print is Hot" for the "Cityscapes" session of the Marshall McLuhan Centennial (Signals from the DEW Line: Art and Poetry in the Global Village), University of Toronto, and "We'll Cross that Road When We Come to It: On Media, Writing, and Creativity" at the 13th Annual Convention of the Media Ecology Association, Manhattan College.

"Exile & Nomadicism: A Community Manifesto" was presented at the Poetry Communities and the Individual Talent Conference, University of Pennsylvania and printed in Jacket2, 2012.

Since 1989, Karasick has collaborated in both print and performance with fellow poet bill bissett and in June 2011, they embarked on a 20th Anniversary World Performance Tour (The Bouchetime Tour) through London, Manchester, Paris, Geneva, Barcelona, Ghent and St. Petersburg promoting sound collage and asemic performance. In November 2012, they celebrated a lifetime of work with The 25th anniversary jubilee celebration of Adeena Karasick & bill bissett collaborations & the Toronto launch for This Poem and novel, which was streamed on the Occupy Toronto channel of Livestream.

== Videos, films, and CDs ==
- LOREM IPSUM (Videopoem) Text from Checking In, vispo Jim Andrews, 2023
- CHECKING IN 2 (Videopoem) Text from Checking In, vispo, Jim Andrews, 2023.
- EICHA 1: THE BOOK OF LUMENATIONS (Videopoem) Text from my Ærotomania, The Book of Lumenations. Music by Frank London, vispo, Jim Andrews and Daniel Bradley, titles, Igor Imhoff, March 2021.
- EICHA 2: THE BOOK OF LUMENATIONS (Videopoem) Text from Ærotomania, The Book of Lumenations. Music by Frank London, video by Igor Imhoff, March 2021.
- UNTIE ME (Videopoem) from track on Mattatoio5 Release, Aug. 2020. Produced and music by Filippo De Liberali, synth programming; Tommaso Meneghello: basso, synth, e testi, Davide Truffo, chitarra.
- DROWN ME (Videopoem) track from Salomé: Woman of Valor Album. Written, performed and produced by Karasick, music by Frank London, Feb. 2021.
- SALOMÉ: WOMAN OF VALOR (CD) with music composed by Frank London, NuJu Records, New York 2020.
- ÆROTOMANIA: HOW THE AIRPLANE IS STRUCTURED LIKE A LANGUAGE (Movie) For the 21st Annual Media Ecology Association Conference, June 2020. Created, Directed, Performed and Produced by Adeena Karasick, Music by Frank London, (featuring vispo by Elizabeth Mak and Jim Andrews).
- ÆROTOMANA (Videopoem) Conceived, Written and Performed by Adeena Karasick, Vispo by Jim Andrews, Music composed and performed by Frank London.
- GARDENS OF EROS (Videopoem) Written, Performed and Produced by Adeena Karasick. Music composed by Frank London, performed by Frank London on Trumpet, Deep Singh on Tabla and Dohl, Shai Bachar, electronics. Visuals created by Abigail Child, edited by Safia Southey.
- DANCE OF DESIRE (Videopoem), Written, Performed and Produced by Adeena Karasick. Music composed by Frank London, performed by Frank London on Trumpet, Deep Singh on Tabla and Dohl, Shai Bachar, electronics. Visuals created by and edited by Elizabeth Mak.
- COVID / KAVOD (Recording), Produced by Lillian Allen, music by Slim (SamGottlieb), with Samantha Ariel Goldman on cello, video and design by Marva Jackson, Toronto / NY, April 2020
- BANDAGE, BONDAGE, STRIPPERS AND SLIPPAGE: THE LANGUAGE AND MEANING OF SALOMÉ IN THE 21ST CENTURY Created for the 66th Annual Alfred Korzybski Symposium: “Language and Meaning in the 21st Century” Institute of General Semantics, New York, NY, 2018.
- THE CRAZY TALK OF CHECKING IN: HONORING THE PAST, CELEBRATING THE PRESENT, SHAPING THE FUTURE Created for the New York State Communication Association 75th Annual Conference Callicoon, NY, 2017 and The 65th Annual Alfred Korzybski Symposium: Crazy Talk Stupid Talk, Institute of General Semantics, New York, NY, 2017
- WHERE IS FANCY BRED: RETHINKING IMAGINATION THROUGH THE “UNTHOUGHT AND HOW THAT AFFECTS COMMUNICATION Created for the 64th Annual Alfred Korzybski Symposium: Language in Thought and Action, Institute of General Semantics, Princeton Club, New York, NY.
- Back in the O.S.V.R.: Medium, Messages and Mysticism: Binding Time With the Ghost in the Machine Created for and screened as part of "The Media IS the Message: Multi-Media and the Future of Publishing" (with Ralph Rivera, BBC Future Media), for BookExpo America 2014, and the 72nd Annual New York State Communication Association Conference and the 62nd Alfred Korzybski Memorial Lecture and Symposium for the Institute of General Semantics, in New York, 2014
- White Abbot, a parodic videopoem Karasick created during the writing of Salome dedicated to the impossible anguish of forbidden love.
- Medium in a Messy Age: Communication in the Era of Technology created for the 71st Annual New York State Communication Association Conference and the Institute of General Semantics, 2013.
- Ceci n'est pas un Téléphone or Hooked on Telephonics: A Pata-philophonemic Investigation of the Telephone created for the Communication and Media Studies Department, Fordham University, and the Media Ecology Association Convention, 2012.
- Lingual Ladies (Video), Produced for Banff Centre for the Arts, 2011.
- I got a crush on Osama (Video), Aired on Fox News, 2009.

Today's politics have reached such a completely absurd level, I felt compelled to comment," said Adeena Karasick of her new video I Got a Crush on Osama released today on YouTube to help promote her new book from Talonbooks, Amuse Bouche: Tasty Treats for the Mouth. The book is a delectable feast of her trademark poetry combining the obsessions of popular culture, politics and linguistic theory into a multi-layered banquet of language often humorous and wry, surprising and sometimes shocking in its juxtapositions, reflecting the often ludicrousness of the techno-saturated world we live in.

- Heart of a Poet (TV Show) Produced for Bravo TV, Maureen Judd and Leslie Valpy (Makin' Movies) 2006.
- This is your final nitrous (Video) Produced for Visible Verse Festival, 2005.
- Sefer yetzirah (Video) Blaine Spiegel. Produced for St. Mark's Poetry Project: NYC, 2004.
- Belle L'être (Video) Produced for St. Mark's Poetry Project. A. Karasick and Marianne Shaneen: NYC, 2002.
- Ribsauce (CD) "Cuadrilla Cadre" Produced by Alex Boutros and Karla Sundström, Wired on Words: Montreal, 2001.
- Prairis/cite maintenance (Video) Produced for Bravo TV, Toronto, 2000.
- Mumbai-Ya (Video) Produced by M. Rosatto-Bennett, NYC, 2000.
- Alphabet City (Video) Produced by A. Karasick: NYC, 1999.
- Women i know (Film) Produced by Pauline Urquhart for Alberta Access Television: NYC, 1998.
- At the fetish cafe (Video) Produced by Lee Gotham: Montreal, 1996.
- Action poetry '94 (Video) Produced at Banff Centre for Performing Arts with Meryn Cadell, Bob Holman, Clifton Joseph, Kedrick James: Alberta: 1994.
- Sensasound 90 (Cassette) with Lillian Allen, Rafael Baretto-Rivera, bill bissett, Paul Dutton, Penn Kemp, Steve McCaffery: Toronto, 1991.
- Language lives (Video) Canadian Poet Series with bp Nichol, Steve McCaffery, Lola Tostevin, bill bissett: Toronto, 1991.
- Liquid waze (Cassette) with bill bissett: Vancouver, 1990.
- Reading performance (Video) with Allen Ginsberg, Gregory Corso, bill bissett

== Awards and grants ==
- 2023 Outstanding Book Award, for Massaging the Medium Seven Pehakuchas, Institute (International Communication Association)
- 2022 Poet Laureate of the Institute of General Semantics
- 2021 Pratt Institute Faculty Development Award for Salomé: Woman of Valor Videopoem Song Cycle
- 2018 Albert Nelson Marquis Lifetime Achievement Award
- 2018 Andrew W. Mellon Foundation Award for Eicha The Book of Lumenations
- 2017 Andrew W. Mellon Foundation Award for Checking In
- 2016 Canada Council for the Arts, Grant for Professional Writers for Checking In
- 2016 Andrew W. Mellon Foundation Award for Salomé: Woman of Valor
- 2016 Voce Donna (l'associazione voceDonna di Castrocaro Terme) for Critical Feminist Contributions to International Literary and Media Studies, Forli, Italia
- 2012 Canada Council for the Arts, Grant for Professional Writers for This Poem
- 2012 The Jewish Daily Forward Top Five Poetry Books in 2012 for This Poem
- 2009 Listing in Poetry Picks 2009 on About.com for Amuse Bouche
- 2000 Bumbershoot Book Fair Award, "Most Adventurous Publication" for Dyssemia Sleaze
- 1999 People's Choice Award, for "Alphabet City", Electrolit International Videopoem Festival, Vancouver, BC
- 1995 Finalist in the Dorothy Livesay Poetry Prize for Mêmewars

== Anthologies ==
In addition to the anthologies below, Karasick's work also has appeared in literary magazines, and academic journals and publications.

- "From Salomé" in Sahityo Café, The Casement of World International Poetry (Ed. Pratysha Sarkar and Saikat Gosh), Kolkata, India, Sept. 2020.
- "Salomé: Woman of Valor Selections" (translated into Bengali), in Bridgeable Lines:An Anthology of Borderless World Poetry in Bengali, (Trans. Aritra Sanyal, eds. Aritra Sanyal and Runa Bandyopadhyay), Hik Publishing, Kolkata, 2019.
- "House of the Rising S[o]ns", in Sciame / Swarm: Lestordite Cultural AssociationAnthology, (Eds. Giorgia Monti and Serena Piccoli), Padova, Italy, 2018
- "From Salomé: Woman of Valor" in Women: Poetry: Migration: An Anthology. (Ed.Jane Joritz-Nakagawa, theenk Books, Washington, 2018.
- "From Checking In", "Song of the Cedilla: I'd Like to be Under the C", "eros for bp", "Here Today Gone Gemara", "Titles for Poems Yet to be Written", Written Rock Anthology, (Ed. Andrew Aitken), Fort Erie, 2017.
- "From the Floor of the Handicapped Stall" and "From Checking In" in The Canary Islands Connection: An Anthology of 60 Contemporary American Poets. (Ed. Manuel Brito), Zasterle Press, Spain, 2017.
- "This Poem (Parts 1-3)", "My Love is Like a Fine, Fine Wine", "With Asura" in Sparkle and Blink 39, (Eds. Casey McAlduff, Nicole McFeely and Janey Smith), Quiet Lightning: San Francisco, 2013).
- "My Love is Like a Fine, Fine Wine" in Voices Israel 2010 Volume 36, (Eds. Michael Dickel and Sheryl Abbey, 2010).
- "You are Advised" in The Portable Boog Reader 3: An Anthology of New York City Poetry, (Ed. David Kirschenbaum, Spring, 2009).
- "Echographies" in Future Welcome: The Moosehead Anthology X, (Ed. Todd Swift. D.C. Books, 2006).
- "After the Anti Oedipus" in In Our Own Words: A Generation Defining Itself, (Ed. Marlow Peerse Weaver, MW Enterprises, 2005).
- "In the Amplifying Cave" and "What it Really Comes Down to Is..." in Hysteria, (Ed. Jennifer Savran. LunaSea Books, Summer, 2003).
- "In the Empire of Grief.II" in Short Fuse, (Ed. Todd Swift, Paris, France, October, 2002).
- "Ambit. Ardour. Orders: A Poetics of Polymedial Pasties" in side/lines: A New Canadian Poetics (Ed. Rob Mclennan, Insomniac Press, Toronto, 2002).
- "Belle L'être" in Vox Populi, Ed. Danika Dinsmore. Seattle, April 2002.
- "from The Arugula Fugues" in The Portable Booglit Reader, (Ed. David Kirschenbaum, New York, NY, November, 2000).
- "Mumbai-Ya" in DC Anthology, (Ed. Allison Cobb, Jen Coleman, Washington, DC, December, 2000).
- "Telephone Talk" in Sisters of the Extreme: Women Writing on the Drug Experience, (Ed. Cynthia Palmer and Michael Horowitz. Park Street Press, Rochester Vermont, 2000)
- "Mellah Marrano" in Contemporary Verse 2: Canadian Women's Writing at Century's End. Vol. 23 No.1 (Summer, 2000).
- "Genrecide" in Poetry Nation: A North American Anthology of Fusion Poets. (Ed. Regie Cabico and Todd Swift. Vehicle Press, Quebec, 1998).
- From "Genrecide" in Carnival: Scream in High Park Reader (Ed. Peter McPhee. Insomniac Press: Toronto, 1996).
- "Telephone Talk" in Revival: Spoken Word from Lollapalooza 94. Ed. Juliette Torrez, Liz Belile, Mud Baron, Jennifer Joseph. (Manic D Press: San Francisco, 1995).
- From "Cut Throat" in Front Lines Anthology of Action Poetry. Vol. I. (Banff: April, 1994).
- "Bad" in Front Lines Anthology of Action Poetry. Vol. II. (Banff: April, 1994).
- "Poetix" in Writing for the New Coast Anthology (Buffalo, 1993).
