= Shilan Fuad =

Kurdish-Italian sociologist and gender studies scholar

Shilan Fuad Hussain
- Born: Kurdistan Region, Iraq
- Education: University of Bologna (MA); University of Urbino (PhD)
- Occupations: Sociologist, Cultural Analyst, Gender Studies Researcher
- Employer(s): Brill, Routledge
- Known for: Research on Kurdish diaspora, gender-based violence, and Middle Eastern cultural studies
- Website: shilanfuadhussain.com

Shilan Fuad Hussain is an interdisciplinary Kurdish academic, researcher, and analyst specializing in socio-cultural studies and gender studies. Her work focuses on the intersection of sociology and cultural analysis, with a specific emphasis on women's rights, the Kurdish diaspora, and Middle Eastern society.

== Early life and education ==
Hussain grew up in Baghdad, Iraq. As a child, her parents forbid her from telling people she was Kurdish or speaking Kurdish in public; she began learning Arabic at age six, when she began school. She lived through multiple periods of conflict, including the Iran–Iraq War and the Gulf War, leaving Baghdad for northern Iraq in the hours after the Gulf War began. She later moved to Europe as part of the Kurdish diaspora, an experience that shaped her academic focus on cultural and political debates.

Hussain holds a master's degree in Middle Eastern Studies from the University of Bologna and a PhD in Cultural Analysis from the University of Urbino in Italy.

She is a polyglot, speaking Kurdish and Italian at a bilingual level, alongside proficiency in Arabic, English, Persian, and French.

== Career ==
Hussain's academic career includes several fellowships. She was a Marie Sklodowska-Curie Postdoctoral Fellow in Gender Studies and Cultural Analysis (UKRI) and has served as a visiting fellow at the Washington Kurdish Institute and a Doctoral Fellow at the Geneva Centre for Security Policy.

As an editor, she serves as an associate editor for Brill and Routledge. She is also an associate fellow of the Higher Education Academy. In addition to her academic roles, she has spent over eleven years working with international NGOs, collaborating with policymakers and civil society to address issues affecting vulnerable populations.

== Research ==
Hussain's research is multi-sited and employs various methods to explore topics related to cultural representation and production, gender-based violence and women's rights, female genital mutilation and forced marriages, the social impacts of masculinity, and multi-identity within the diaspora. She has published 20 peer-reviewed journal articles, four book chapters, and a co-edited book, with several additional volumes scheduled for publication in 2025. Furthermore, she has been an invited speaker at approximately 50 international conferences across Europe, the United States, and the Middle East.

== Publications ==
- Fuad Hussain, Shilan (2023-07-04). "Kurdish Women's Feminist Poetry: Developing a Voice in Southern Kurdistan and the Diaspora". In Korangy, Alireza; Mortezaee, Mahlagha (eds.). Essays on Modern Kurdish Literature. Walter de Gruyter GmbH & Co KG. pp. 171–191. ISBN 978-3-11-063468-6.
