= Matthew Fuller (author) =

Matthew Fuller is an author and Professor of Cultural Studies at the Department of Media and Communications, Goldsmiths, University of London. He is known for his writings in media theory, software studies, critical theory and cultural studies, and contemporary fiction.

== Work ==
His book Media Ecologies examines the interactions of complex media systems in current art practices. Drawing on the theories of Marshall McLuhan, Félix Guattari, and William Burroughs, Fuller explores unorthodox and non-traditional uses of media. The book analyses interventionist art projects by BIT (Bureau of Inverse Technology), Irational.org, pirate radio projects, surveillance video projects, and the work of conceptual artist John Hilliard. According to WorldCat, this book is in 890 libraries In Evil Media, Fuller and co-author Andrew Goffey examine media power in the form of information systems, addressing, as the book states, "the gray zones in which media exist as corporate work systems, algorithms and data structures, twenty-first century self-improvement manuals, and pharmaceutical techniques." Fuller is also a media artist. He has collaborated with a number of art collectives, including I/O/D, Mongrel, MediaShed, and The Container Project. Along with Lev Manovich and Noah Wardrip-Fruin, Fuller co-founded the MIT Press book series Software Studies.

== See also ==
- Marshall McLuhan
- Gilles Deleuze
- Félix Guattari
- Friedrich Kittler
- media ecology
- Internet art
- software art
- software studies

== Bibliography ==
- Flyposter Frenzy: Posters from the AntiCopyright Network (Working Press, 1992)
- Unnatural: Techno-Theory for a Contaminated Culture (Underground, 1994)
- ATM (Shade Editions, 2000)
- Behind the Blip: Essays on the Culture of Software (Autonomedia, 2003)
- Media Ecologies: Materialist Energies in Art and Technoculture (MIT Press, 2007)
- Urban Visioning System 1.0 (Architectural League of New York, 2008)
- Software Studies: A Lexicon (MIT Press, 2008) According to WorldCat, this book is in 1000 libraries
- Real Projects for Real People, with Anne Nigten, Kristina Andersen, Sam Nemeth (NAI Publishers, 2010)
- Elephant and Castle: A Novel (Autonomedia, 2011)
- Evil Media, co-authored with Andrew Goffey (MIT Press, 2012)
- How to Sleep: The Art, Biology and Culture of Unconsciousness (Bloomsbury, 'Lines' Series, 2018)
- Bleak Joys, aesthetics of ecology and imposisbility, co-authored with Olga Goriunova, (Minnesota University Press, 2020)
- Investigative Aesthetics, Conflicts and Commons in the Politics of Truth co-authored with Eyal Weizman, (Verso, 2021)
