= Lev Manovich =

American academic

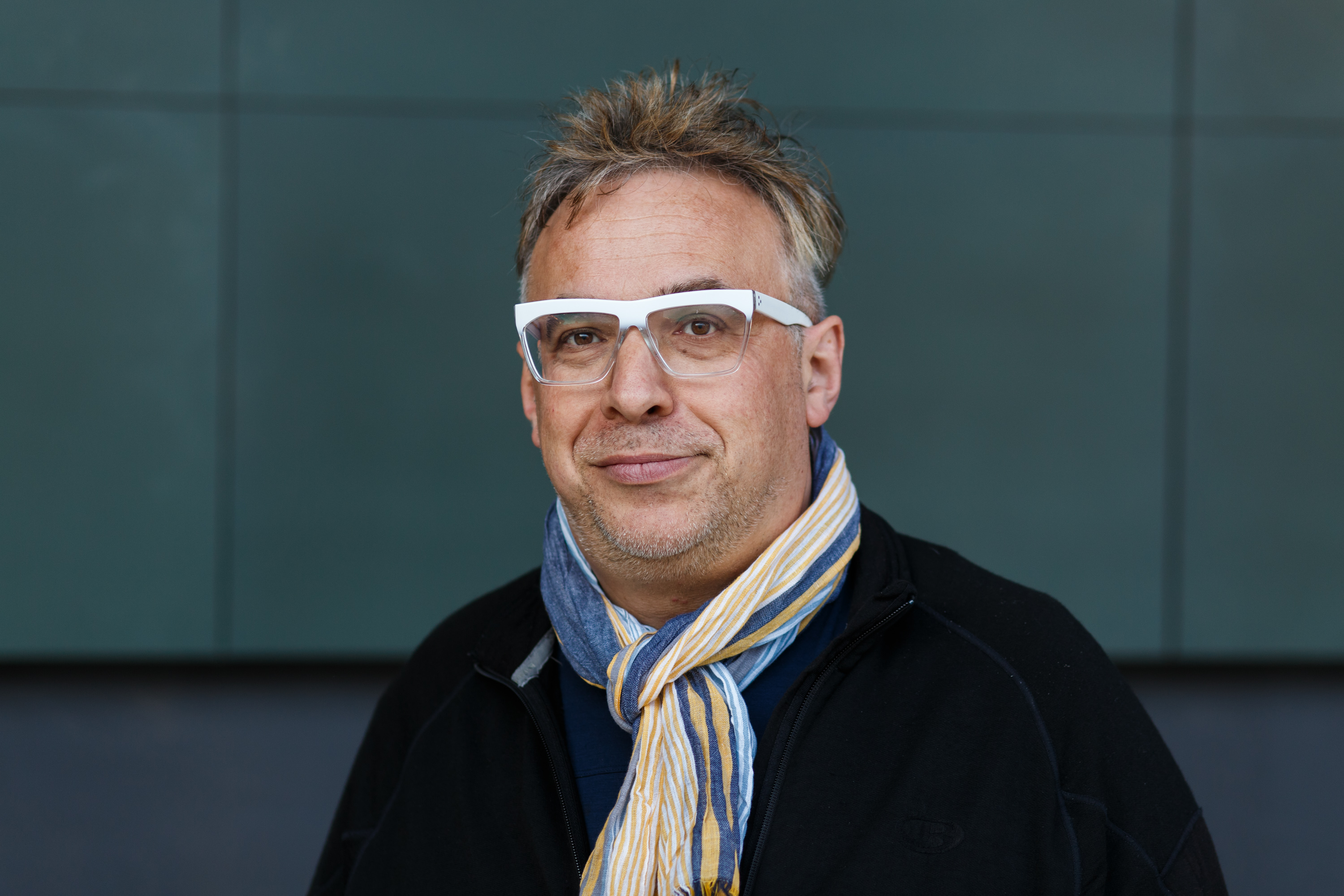
- Professor Lev Manovich at Strelka Institute in 2015
- Born: 1960; Moscow, Russia
- Notable work: The Language of New Media
- Website: www.manovich.net

Lev Manovich (/ˈmænəvɪtʃ/ MAN-ə-vitch) is an artist, author and theorist of digital culture. He is a distinguished professor at the Graduate Center of the City University of New York. Manovich played a key role in creating four new research fields: new media studies (1991-), software studies (2001-), cultural analytics (2007-) and AI aesthetics (2018-). Manovich's current research focuses on generative media, AI culture, digital art, and media theory.

Manovich is the founder and director of the Cultural Analytics Lab (called Software Studies Initiative 2007-2016), which pioneered use of data science and data visualization for the analysis of massive collections of images and videos (cultural analytics). The lab was commissioned to create visualizations of cultural datasets for Google, New York Public Library, and New York's Museum of Modern Art (MoMA).

He is the author and editor of 15 books, including The Language of New Media, which has been translated into fourteen languages. Manovich's latest academic book, Cultural Analytics, was published in 2020 by the MIT Press.

== Biography ==
Manovich was born in Moscow, USSR, where he studied painting, architecture, computer science, and semiotics. After spending several years practicing fine arts, he moved to New York in 1981. His interests shifted from still image and physical 3D space to virtual space, moving images, and the use of computers in media. While in New York, he received a M.A. in Experimental Psychology (NYU, 1988) and additionally worked professionally in 3D computer animation from 1984 to 1992. He then went on to receive a Ph.D. in Visual and Cultural Studies from the University of Rochester in 1993 under the supervision of Mieke Bal. His Ph.D. dissertation, The Engineering of Vision from Constructivism to Computers, traces the origins of computer media, relating it to the avant-garde of the 1920s.

Manovich has worked with computer media as an artist, computer animator, designer, and programmer since 1984. His art projects include Little Movies, the first digital film project designed for the Web (1994-1997), Freud-Lissitzky Navigator, a conceptual software for navigating twentieth century history (1999), and Anna and Andy, a streaming novel (2000). He is also well known for his insightful articles, including "New Media from Borges to HTML" (2001) and "Database as Symbolic Form" (1998). In the latter article, he explains why databases have become so popular, while juxtaposing them to concepts such as algorithms and narrative. His works have been included in many key international exhibitions of new media art. In 2002, Manovich presented his mini-retrospective at the Institute of Contemporary Arts in London under the title Lev Manovich: Adventures of Digital Cinema.

Manovich has taught new media art since 1992. He has also been a visiting professor at California Institute of the Arts, University of California, Los Angeles (UCLA), University of Amsterdam, Stockholm University, and University of Art and Design Helsinki. In 1993, students of his digital movie making classes at the UCLA Lab for New Media founded the Post-Cinematic Society which organized some of the first digital movie festivals based on his ideas about new media such as database cinema. Since 1999, he has given more than 180 lectures on new media in North and South America, Europe and Asia.

In 2007 Manovich founded the research lab Software Studies Initiative, which was subsequently renamed as the Cultural Analytics Lab in 2016.

On November 8, 2012, it was announced that Manovich would be joining the faculty of the City University of New York's Graduate Center in January 2013, with the goal of enhancing the graduate school's digital initiatives.

== Selected books and projects ==
=== The Language of New Media ===
The book, The Language of New Media (2001), covers many aspects of cultural software: for example, he identifies a number of key tools or processes (he calls them 'operations') that underpin commercial software from word processing to video editing programs. These include the conventions of 'cut and paste' copy, find, delete, transform, etc. The extracts we have chosen highlight significant 'new' aspects of the new media Manovich is concerned with. He is often concerned with visual culture and especially with moving image, so the first sections, 'The Database' and 'Database and Algorithm', explore something of the distinct ways in which computers store and manipulate information (here, for example, moving image footage). He compares this with traditional techniques of manipulating and editing film stock. The 'Navigable Space' extract is also concerned with the moving image, but this is the moving image as a mapping or modeling of virtual space. From architectural 'fly-throughs' to the visceral and violent pleasures of exploring the corridors of the videogame Doom, virtual space is discussed as a significant new cultural form that draws on pre-digital visual and cinematic culture.

In "New Media from Borges to HTML" (2001), Manovich describes the eight definitions of "new media":

1. New Media versus Cyberculture
2. New Media as Computer Technology Used as a Distribution Platform
3. New Media as Digital Data Controlled by Software
4. New Media as the Mix Between Existing Cultural Conventions and the Conventions of Software
5. New Media as the Aesthetics that Accompanies the Early Stage of Every New Modern Media and Communication Technology
6. New Media as Faster Execution of Algorithms Previously Executed Manually or through Other Technologies
7. New Media as the Encoding of Modernist Avant-Garde; New Media as Metamedia
8. New Media as Parallel Articulation of Similar Ideas in Post-WWII Art and Modern Computing

=== Soft Cinema ===
His digital art project Soft Cinema was commissioned by ZKM for the exhibition Future Cinema (2002–03); traveling to Helsinki, Finland, and Tokyo, Japan, in April 2003. "Although the films resemble the familiar genres of cinema, the process by which they were created demonstrates the possibilities of soft(ware) cinema. A "cinema," that is, in which human subjectivity and the variable choices made by custom software combine to create films that can run infinitely without ever exactly repeating the same image sequences, screen layouts, or narratives. Each Soft Cinema run offers a unique viewing experience for the audience; the software works with a set of parameters that allow for almost every part of a film to change."

Soft Cinema projects mine the creative possibilities that exist at the intersection of software culture, cinema, and architecture. Its manifestations include films, dynamic visualization, computer-driven installations, architectural designs, print catalogs, and DVDs.

=== Software Takes Command ===
Software Takes Command was published in 2013 by Bloomsbury Academic. The book analyses in detail software applications such as Photoshop and After Effects, and how their interfaces and tools shape the visual aesthetics of contemporary media and design. This analysis is framed by a history of media's "softwarization" in the 1960s and 1970s (‘the transfer of techniques and interfaces of all previously existing media technologies to software’). The book includes a theoretical discussion of whether we can still speak about media as ‘a relatively small number of distinct mediums’, given software’s propensity to hybridize previously separate media and multiply.

Manovich develops the concept of metamedia that was originally proposed by Alan Kay. Metamedia refers to our use of digital computers to both simulate most previous artistic media and define endless new media. Manovich explains the differences between metamedia, multimedia, and remediation. The book uses a number of classical new media artworks as examples to illustrate how artists and designers create new metamedia.

The title is a reference to Mechanization Takes Command (1948) written by Sigfried Giedion. It is part of the series International Texts in Critical Media Aesthetics, founded by series editor Francisco J. Ricardo. An earlier draft version of the book was released under a Creative Commons license.

=== Instagram and Contemporary Image ===
Manovich's Instagram and Contemporary Image was released under a Creative Commons license in 2017. The book's four parts were written during 2016. Each part was posted online after it was finished. The parts were then later edited and combined into a single PDF.

The first half of the book develops a typology of images shared on Instagram, dividing them into ‘casual’, ‘professional’, and ‘designed’. In the latter half of the book, Manovich focuses on how Instagram allows its users to establish and develop their identities through their photos’ subjects, compositions, palettes, contrast levels, edits, filters, and presets. He identifies Instagram as an example of the ‘aesthetic society’, in which various tribes emerge and sustain themselves through their aesthetic choices.

This work was both the first academic book about Instagram, and the first book in the then emerging field of digital art history. It is based on research carried out by the author, his lab and collaborators in 2012-2015. During this period, the lab created a number of projects that used 17 million geo-located Instagram images from 18 cities. These projects included Phototrails, Selfiecity, The Exceptional and The Everyday, and On Broadway. Each project used computer vision, machine learning and data visualization to analyze different patterns in content and visual aesthetics across large numbers of publicly shared Instagram images.

In 2018, the book was translated into Japanese and published in a special edition with contributions from nine Japanese authors.

=== Cultural Analytics ===
Manovich's most recent book Cultural Analytics was published by The MIT Press in October 2020. Situated at the intersection of data science, cultural studies and media theory, the book introduces key concepts for the analysis of culture using computational and data visualization methods. In contrast to many works in digital humanities that focus on analysis of text, the book pays particular attention to visual media.

The book argues for the necessity of using computational methods to be able to “see” contemporary culture given its immense scale. If traditional methods of analysis such as ‘close readings of small samples’ were adequate to study smaller communities of creators in previous centuries, they evidently do not allow for representative studies of digital culture, where millions of cultural artifacts are created and shared daily. Manovich develops the concept of ‘exploratory media analysis’ - the use of special visualization techniques to explore large visual collections without formulating a particular hypothesis beforehand. While exploratory data analysis is a standard practice in data science, similar methods did not exist until recently in media studies, art history and other fields dealing with visual culture.

The book’s conclusion discusses the advantages and limitations of cultural analytics, beyond its ability to analyze cultural artifacts on a large scale. Cultural analytics resembles the humanities of the 20th century in that it looks for patterns. However, it does not start with already accepted cultural categories. Instead, it analyzes ‘raw’ cultural data to find new patterns. However, Manovich also points out that ‘any cultural pattern…captures similarities among a number of artifacts on only some dimensions, ignoring their other differences’. This is an important limitation of a research paradigm that measures various characteristics in large collections of artifacts, and then looks for patterns in these characteristics. However, despite this limitation, Manovich remains optimistic about both the theoretical and practical potential of computational paradigms. In contrast to 20th century structuralism and related programs that aimed to reduce diversity of culture to a small number of patterns, cultural analytics in Manovich’s view should aim to fully describe contemporary culture’s global diversity without reduction: ‘that is, to focus on what is different among numerous artifacts and not only on what they share’.

== Books ==
- Tekstura: Russian Essays on Visual Culture, editor, together with Alla Efimova (Chicago: University of Chicago Press, 1993).
- Info Aesthetics, a semi-open source book/Web site in progress. Project started August 2000, last update October 2001.
- Metamediji (in Serbian) (Belgrade: Center for Contemporary Arts: 2001).
- Soft Cinema, with contributions by Andreas Angelidakis, Jason Danziger, Andreas Kratky, and Ruth M. Lorenz (Karlsruhe: ZKM Center for Art and Media Karlsruhe, 2002).
- The Language of New Media (Cambridge, Massachusetts: MIT Press, 2001).
- Black Box - White Cube (in German) (Berlin: Merve Verlag, 2005).
- Soft Cinema: Navigating the Database, together with Andreas Kratky (Cambridge, Massachusetts: MIT Press, 2005).
- Software Culture (in Italian) (Milano: Edizioni Olivares, 2010).
- Software Takes Command (New York: Bloomsbury Academic, 2013).
- The Illusions (Cambridge, Massachusetts: MIT Press, 2014).
- Data Drift: Archiving Media and Data Art in the 21st Century, editor, together with Rasa Smite and Raitis Smits (Riga: RIXC, LiepU MPLab, 2015).
- Instagram and Contemporary Image (New York, 2017).
- Theories of Software Cultures (in Russian) (Nizhny Novgorod: Krasnaya Lastochka, 2017).
- Instagram and Contemporary Image (in Japanese), with contributions by Kiritorimederu, Akihiro Kubota, Yoshiaki Kai, Kouichiro Shibao, Junya Tsutsui, Kosuke Nagata, Barbora, Osamu Maekawa, Nobuhiro Masuda (Tokyo: BNN, 2018).
- Cultural Analytics (Cambridge, Mass.: MIT Press, 2020)

== See also ==
- Cultural analytics
- Data mining
- Data Visualization
- Digital humanities
- New Media Art
- Electronic literature
- Software studies
- Computer vision
- Artificial intelligence
