= Yuri Rozhdestvensky =

Yuri Rozhdestvensky (December 21, 1926 – October 24, 1999) was a Russian rhetorician, educator, linguist and philosopher. Rozhdestvensky started his scholarly career from writing on Chinese grammar; his second Ph.D. involved the study and comparison of 2,000 grammars and established several language universals; he then moved on to comparative study of Chinese, Indian, Arabic and European rhetorical traditions, and then to the study of general laws of culture. Rozhdestvensky's influence continues to be powerful. In his lifetime, he directed 112 dissertations. His students now teach culture, media ecology, linguistics and communication theory courses in leading colleges in Russia.

== Accumulative approach to media ==
Similar to the field of media ecology which was developed in the West, Rozhdestvensky studied the role of communication media in society. Rozhdestvensky developed the theory of language in the information age. It says that language in society goes through the following stages:

1. evolvement of language, the stage of folklore and syncretic performance. Plato's Cratylus addresses the philosophy of language for that period;
2. formation of canonical texts, when the language of the religious canon is studied in schools and often creates diglossia. It is the stage of written language, and its philosophy is contained in the theories of divine origin of language;
3. national languages, which arise after the printing press. At that stage countries receive documents and classical texts in vernacular and vernacular mutates into a national language. The language philosophy of that stage is contained in the theory of social contract;
4. the informational age, the stage of languages spilling beyond national borders and employing electronic means for recording verbal acts.

The following classification of texts reflects the stages of language development, showing the accumulation of genres with the introduction of each new medium. Oral Genres: Pre-literary (daily dialogue, rumor, folklore) and literary (oratory (forensic, consultative, ceremonial), homily (sermon, lecture, propaganda), theater. Written genres: sphragistics, numismatics, epigraphy, paleography (personal letters, documents, literature). Printed genres: fiction, scientific literature, journalism. Mass Communication: mass information (radio, TV, newspapers), advertising, computer languages. This classification is open-ended and is meant to be a living tool – new genres which appear with the invention of a new medium will be comfortably plugged in the chart as its next level. One of the key aspects of the theory of language in the information age is that old genres do not disappear or lose their importance. On the contrary, they become invigorated and grow with the help of new technologies.

Every society has the three pre-literary genres: oral dialogue, folklore and news. For thousands of years human societies lived comfortably with those genres, perfected them and crystallized the rules of their use. In folklore we find everything needed to govern human communication: rules prescribing to listen before speaking (god gave you one mouth and two ears!); rules prohibiting direct physical and emotional harm to the listener (don't talk about the rope in the house of the hanged) and rules prescribing thinking before action (think before you leap). Folklore becomes the repository of culture because it is a form of speech that every member of a society is required to accept and heed as many times as the folklore text is directed at the listener. The main rule of communication recorded in folklore – do not harm the listener – puts important and different checks on the content of each of the above genres. Folklore never contains direct denigration of society members, and if criticism is issued, the figures of folklore are metaphorical – animals act instead of people. News may not include defamation – if it does, it becomes rumor, a scorned form of tongue flapping. Oral dialogue may not contain messages harmful for immediate participants of the conversation, but may have content denigrating a third party – as long as the conversation content remains confidential.

Only slowly and relatively recently does writing seep in the communication chart, first as seals and inscriptions on things (sphragistics and epigraphy), then as written genres, literature being one of them - a fairly late one, coming after documents and letters. With the appearance of writing old genres receive an influx of new energy: folklore can be recorded and stored, oral dialogue can involve exchange of notes, news can be recorded and spread confidentially. Public speeches now may be written down before they are pronounced, and there is an expectation of greater uniformity in grammar even in traditional oral genres.

With the invention of the printing press the number of genres grows. Again, the old genres do not disappear but become invigorated by the new technology – more of everything can be published now. For instance, scientific community can start a more rigorous exchange of ideas. For another instance, writing and publishing fiction becomes a major industry.

Electronic technology brings with it mass communication. The use of computer influenced almost every genre on the chart (e.g. documents and oral dialogue – modified and enhanced by e-mail) and added new ones, like blogs and web sites, which were not on Rozhdestvensky's chart, but fit in comfortably, like new elements into the Mendeleev's table.

In the information age it is important to study new genres and the influence of new media on old genres. It is also important to understand that the explosion of new technologies has happened before: with the invention of writing, with printing press, telegraph and radio. Humankind has coped with the previous technological explosions and expansions of genres, and is now coping with another step on the same road. In the Western tradition, similar ideas have been expressed by Marshall McLuhan and Neil Postman.

== The Study of Culture ==
Rozhdestvensky founded a vibrant school of culture studies in Moscow Lomonosov University, profoundly influencing Russian intellectuals through his writing and teaching. To make culture amenable to organized study, Rozhdestvensky identifies, classifies and describes the domains of culture common to all human societies. He builds his blueprint on John Locke’s (1690) three parts of knowledge outlined in his An Essay Concerning Human Understanding. For Locke “all that can fall within the compass of human understanding” is of three sorts: physica (natural philosophy), practica (“the skill of right applying our own powers and actions, for the attainment of things good and useful”) and semeiotike (“the nature of signs the mind makes use of for the understanding of things, or conveying its knowledge to others”). Rozhdestvensky (1996) explains how three commonly noted domains of culture—physical, material and spiritual—may be interpreted as relationships between the vectors of Locke's three domains of knowledge (physica, practica and semeiotike).

In order to make the field amenable to study in its totality Rozhdestvensky also introduces its division into the culture of a person, an organization and a whole society. The culture of a person exists inside that person and is available to other persons who are in contact with him/her. It is the person's skills and knowledge. The culture of a whole society is impersonal, is preserved in archives, museums, libraries and is (or at least should be) accessible for all members of society. Their relationship forms a matrix:

	Person	Organization	Society
Physical	+	+	--
Spiritual	+	--	+
Material	--	+	+

=== Components of culture ===
According to Rozhdestvensky, physical culture contains hygiene, childbirth and birth control, games, rites, diet, safety, etc.; material culture contains animal breeds, plants, cultivated soils, buildings, tools, roads and transportation, communication technology; spiritual culture contains morality (tribal, religious, professional, national and global levels), beauty (applied and non-applied art), and knowledge (information, wisdom, including religions, science). Categories of spiritual culture are correlated with the categories of philosophy:

	Truth	Beauty	Justice
Morality	--	--	+
Beauty	--	+	--
Knowledge	+	--	--

Trained as a linguist, Rozhdestvensky developed a semiotic approach to the study of culture. In the Introduction to the Study of Culture he argues (ch. 2) that signs are the carriers of culture; e.g. nature becomes part of culture when it is studied by humans, which can be done by verbal description, by codifying soils or domestic animal breeds, etc. Sometimes the process is not formal, e.g. personal physical culture of an individual becomes formally described or recorded only in exceptional cases. Rozhdestvensky demonstrates that it is impossible to record culture outside semiotics. Rozhdestvensky argues based on archeological, folklore and ethnographic data that all human societies possess sixteen semiotic systems. Of these systems four (language, rites, games and count) are of unifying, society-wide application, and the rest are specialized systems where non-experts can participate, but only select individuals achieve master-level skill. They are the systems of prognosis (signs, omens, fortune-telling), non-applied art (dance, music, pictures), applied art (crafts, architecture, costume), management (commands, measures, reference points). As societies become more complex and technology develops, no new semiotic systems are added, but the existing ones grow; e.g. weather forecasters and financial engineers use advance computers and mathematical models to predict the behavior of weather fronts or stock markets, expanding the semiotics of prognosis.

The unique value of Rozhdestvensly's approach is that it systematizes the study of culture so that societies can apply it to further their spiritual and economic well-being. He argues that mastery of culture is the condition of proper application of capital to land, demonstrates how economic wealth interplays with other ideals of humankind like truth, honor, honesty, beauty, creativity, leisure and basic human health, and explores the "art of world-wide community". Thus, the proposed translation will be of use not only to humanities scholars and to the general public, but also to policy-makers, because it can inform their economic and social decisions with the understanding of cultural processes.

As one example of the application of Rozhdestvensly's theory to practical dilemmas of contemporary world, consider his study of the levels of morality. These levels are tribal (justifying murder for the sake of protection of kin or tribal territory), religious (where the murder of a non-relative is as condemned as the murder of a relative), professional (often involving exceptions to religious morality, e.g. artists who are required to prefer beauty over truth), and ecological (the level that presumes to overcome tribal, religious or professional allegiances for the sake of global well-being). Rozhdestvensky demonstrates how all of these levels co-exist and complement each other within individuals in the world "struggling with globalist forces on the one hand and localist instincts on the other" (Leach, Bridging Cultures, 2009).

=== The Law of Non-Destruction and Accumulation of Culture ===
In his Introduction to the Study of Culture Rozhdestvensky defines culture as events, facts and artifacts that are relevant for future generations because they provide rules, precedents and best practices. In that sense culture includes patterns of daily activity that constitute rules, and examples of human achievement that constitute precedents and best practices. New artifacts or events appear; they are accepted or ignored by users, and critiqued and evaluated by experts; then they are included in museum or other appropriate collections; they become systematized and codified. Then they become part of culture. The process of selection, description, codification is the process of formation of culture. In that sense there is no “high” or “low” inside culture: if something is low quality, it does not become selected by users and experts and does not become culture. It remains on the level of daily exploits, vanity and handfuls of wind, and eventually sinks into oblivion. Once an event or work of art has become part of culture, it stays forever. This is the Law Of Accumulation And Non-Destruction Of Culture.

According to this law, new facts and artifacts do not cancel out other facts that are already included in culture; facts and artifacts belonging to one time period form a stratum; new strata enhance and invigorate old ones. For example, preliterary societies use animals as a source of power (horses, oxen, donkeys, mules, etc.); ancient civilizations add mechanisms (windmills, water mills) and keep and improve, through selection and breeding, the breeds of animals used as source of power; modern civilization adds electricity and nuclear power and keeps animals as a source of power, enhancing that old stratum through attributing entertainment value to it (e.g. hay rides and sleigh rides at $3 per adult at a historic farm). For another example, every preliterary society has oral speech, news and folklore; when writing is invented, old genres become invigorated and grow with the help of the new technology: folklore can be recorded and stored, oral dialogue can involve exchange of notes, news can be recorded and spread confidentially, public speeches now may be written down before they are pronounced, and there is an expectation of greater uniformity in grammar even in traditional oral genres. With the invention of the printing press manuscripts receive standard orthography, footnotes, tables of content, i.e. printing adds onto the achievements of the written stage; and certainly with the introduction of electronic means oral genres are not cancelled out but are enhanced (we can now talk on the phone or even a videophone), written genres are enhanced (documents, letters and memos receive additional formatting and can be exchanged faster) and printed genres are enhanced (e.g. many texts can be accessed easier, searched for specific expressions and abundantly commented).

An important task of society is to acculturate the young. The degree of cultural knowledge differentiates generations. It is confirmed in the initiation rites that the young ones pass. All peoples have initiation rites to mark a person's passage into the category of adults; all of those rites include a course of study and some testing that needs to be completed before the rites are administered. The new generation needs to be “assimilated” into the culture of their parents in order to be able to function. Clearly, each generation has a characteristic behavior; each generation re-assesses “old” culture.

The new generations almost never criticize or reject the physical culture of their society: they accept uncritically what coaches and teachers present to them; the innovations in physical culture come from the old generation – teachers and coaches.

Material culture is not so lucky: the new generations will re-assess existing agricultural practices, technologies, buildings, materials, etc. and try to approach them differently, or introduce new additions. However, the young ones are usually respectful of the old generation's material culture because they need to use it until they can invent something better.

The worst lot falls to spiritual culture: learning it is a long and dull process, so it is easier to start creating your own, anew, rejecting the “obsolete”. Every new generation goes through this cycle: they create their own new works of art and behavior precedents. For instance, modernism negated preceding culture and claimed to start a “new era”. They create a new style. In this sense, every new style is, to a degree, demonstration of ignorance. Often new styles are based on inventions of a new technology or on an innovation in division of labor.

There is a dialogical relationship between “culture” – things that have already been selected as rules and precedents – and current goings-on of creative work. They feed off each other: new items are born in the imagination and intuition of an artist; those new items are successful if they find their place in relation to the tradition; tradition is enriched by new items. It is the role of users and experts to determine what products of the new aesthetic become part of tradition, i.e. overall human culture (for the future generations to try to overthrow). It is the role of educators to include those items in the curriculum and to adjust curriculum accordingly. It is certainly the role of educators to preserve in the curriculum everything important that has been a part of culture.

=== Educational, usage-related and physical vandalism ===
Destruction of culture is called vandalism. Vandalism can be physical, when facts of culture are physically lost. More interesting are two other forms. Usage-related vandalism means that access to facts of culture becomes limited or hampered. Educational vandalism means that knowledge is not passed on, or education loses prestige, or schools are stagnated in their curriculum and methods. All three forms of vandalism will wreck a country's culture. Educational vandalism can be avoided if the curriculum includes the old achievements, timely includes new achievements and teaches old subjects through the prism of new stylistic interests.

=== Influence of mass media on culture and style ===
In ch.4 of Philosophy of Language. Study of Culture and Didactics Rozhdestvensky describes the cultural and stylistic processes caused by mass media. In the 20th century mass culture became a third field in human history (after the military and the sports) to be gemmated into a pocket with its own rituals, language, management, prognosis, etc. However, unlike the military and sports, mass culture is inexorably linked to mass information (being dependent on TV, newspapers, radio) which is by definition not a cultural but a transient text. This makes mass culture also a transient phenomenon oriented at the style of one particular generation (though does not preclude a possibility of a timeless piece being created in that field).

Mass advertisement is, obviously, also dependent on mass information and is influenced by its collage and figurative structure. Its goal is to cause a desire in recipients. To cause a desire it is necessary to use semiotic signs to appeal to the rational, the emotional and the subconscious. This is why mass advertisement turns to research in animal psychology. It addresses all levels of zoological behavior in humans: tropism and taxis, which are behavior patterns common to all forms of life, e.g. viruses and bacteria moving to parts of the Petri dish that contain more broth; knee-jerk reflexes, which is a behavior present in all animals with a nervous system; instincts, i.e. innate complex behavior programs, like those determining reproductive or social behavior in insects; conditional reflexes, like salivation of Pavlov's dogs; rational behavior demonstrated in an individual's learning, e.g. a mouse memorizing through trial and error the shortest way to food in a labyrinth; and finally conscious behavior, i.e. solving new problems in new situations, e.g. a cat rolling its toy under a closed door and walking around through a second door to reach the toy. Common to all advertisement is attracting attention through paradoxical images. Also common to all forms of advertisement is the change in the notion of “value”: from a philosophical and ideological notion it has changed into an object of desire. Advertisement creates values in the sense that it causes recipients to desire additional objects.

Mass games are lotteries, TV word-guessing games, trivia games, erudition competitions, and others. While games have folk origin, mass games depend on mass information. The games include prizes, i.e. financial interests, not even excepting children athletic competitions. This creates an atmosphere of gambling and chance, where taking a risk or subjecting oneself to public embarrassment may suddenly result in a windfall. Many such games are fairly plebeian, e.g. eating competitions or public undressing and dressing; all are based on a desire of a chance reward. Amplified by mass media they create an atmosphere of primitiveness and of possible luck.

Together, mass culture, mass advertisement and mass games produce the feeling of liberation and a state of mind in which success is necessary, is achieved through a gamble without effort, and can be achieved through a new gamble if this one didn't work out. This combination contrasts with the scary dark news of mass information. On the other side of the screen there are someone else's disasters like airplane crashes, famines, arms race, etc.; those gloomy events underscore the joy of entertainment, game, freedom and intuitive good guesses. Life, ideally, is shaped as a sequence of stages: carefree babyhood; studying for the sake of future earnings; earnings; and, thanks to the earnings, carefree idleness after retirement. People steeped in mass media are seized by a desire to acquire valuables and by the fear of losing those valuables as accidentally as they were acquired.

Beyond such state of mind there is real life with family, creativity, professional achievement. This serious life requires consistent work and real feelings; it has its foundation in real culture, i.e. in rules and precedents selected in history. Productive activity is impossible for individuals limited to mass media culture oriented at quick changes of fashion and not familiar with real culture. Of all new technologies, computer programs reflect real productive activity. Computer programs can participate in almost all semiotic systems that service human culture, e.g. computer design (applied arts), computer graphics and music (non-applied arts), computer games, computer simulation (prognosis). Two semiotic systems do not use computer programming: rites and dance. Those two are not eligible for computer help because their material carrier is the human body which so far cannot be blended with computer hardware. Thus there is an opposition between transient, fleeting products of mass media and real culture that forms the foundation of real life.

One may say that the aesthetic of the new generation and modern development of culture have been influenced by the tragic mood of mass information and the euphoric mood of mass entertainment. Together they produce a few effects. Parenthetically, we should not count acquisitive impulses and other physiological effects among serious cultural shifts: they are better classified as curable diseases of mass media consumers; the cure lies in turning off the TV for a few days. Valid modern developments include these: heightened interest in religion as the bearer of more solid moral values (people need an anchor, after all); heightened interest in health and activity in the adulthood and old age (valeology); heightened interest in games and winning (game-ology?); heightened interest in world culture, its logic and typology (culture studies). Rozhdestvensky calls the former three “stylistic interests”. The latter appears because it may be helpful in predicting future style changes. Rozhdestvenky offers the following chain of reasoning: ecological and valeological interests are often in contradiction with the game interests; the contradiction may be resolved through study of style; even the most sophisticated mathematical models cannot predict future style changes; however, systematization of culture, its typological and comparative study may give us tools to see the laws of style shift.

=== Related schools of thought ===
Rozhdestvensky's approach to the study of culture is culturology (). In the Eastern European tradition it is a widely developed field of study. In the Western tradition, a similar approach was proposed by Leslie White, though White developed it in a different direction and did not propose a comprehensive structure of human culture encompassing physical, material and spiritual as equal components. Cultural studies, the approach based on the work of Stuart Hall, Michel Foucault, Raymond Williams and others, calls for sensitivity to points of view and to the marginalization of "the other", especially considering that educators to a large extent are able to control students' perspectives. This approach is very different from the systematic approach to the underlying patterns of culture advocated and developed by Rozhdestvensky.

== Books ==
- Rozhdestvensky Yuri. Typology of the Word. Moscow: Vyshaya Shkola, 1969.
- Amirova, Olhovikov, Rozhdestvensky. Essays in the History of Linguistics. Moscow: Science, 1975
- Rozhdestvensky Yuri. Introduction to General Language Study. Moscow: Vyshaya Shkola, 1979
- Rozhdestvensky, Yuri., Sychev O. General scientific lexicon in automated translation. International Forum on Information and Documentation, vol 9 #2 p. 23-27, 1984.
- Volkov, Marchuk, Rozhdestvensky. Introduction to Applied Linguistics. Moscow: Moscow State Univ. Press, 1988
- Rozhdestvensky Yuri. Lectures in General Linguistics. Moscow: Vyshaya Shkola, 1990
- Rozhdestvensky Yuri. Introduction to the study of culture. Moscow, CheRo: 1996 http://www.eastwest.edu/wp-content/uploads/2015/01/Rozhdestvensky-Introduction-to-the-study-of-Culture-Intro-and-ch-1.pdf
- Rozhdestvensky Yuri. General Language Study. Moscow, Fund New Millennium: 1996 http://www.eastwest.edu/wp-content/uploads/2015/01/Rozhdestvensky-Language-Theory-and-the-Problem-of-Language-Development.pdf
- Rozhdestvensky, Yuri. Theory of Rhetoric, Moscow: Dobrosvet, 1997.
- Rozhdestvensky Yuri. Principles of modern rhetoric. Moscow: Fund New Millennium, 1999
- Rozhdestvensky Yuri. Philosophy of Language. Study of Culture and Didactics. Moscow: Grant, 2003
