= Norman M. Klein =

American author and historian

- Born: 1945 (age 80–81); Brooklyn, New York
- Education: University of Southern California; University of Illinois; University of Minnesota; Brooklyn College Cinema, Professional Writing, and History
- Known for: Media Historian, Social Critic, Novelist, Educator
- Awards: Graham Foundation, Art Center Faculty Enrichment Grant, California Council for the Humanities, National Endowment for the Humanities, Mellon Foundation Creative Leave

Norman M. Klein (born 1945) is an American urban and media historian, as well as an author of fictional works. In 2011, the Los Angeles Times put Klein's 1997 book The History of Forgetting: Los Angeles and the Erasure of Memory on its "Best L.A. Books" list.

== Early life ==
Born in Brooklyn, Klein grew up in an immigrant neighborhood where he regularly heard people tell stories that were partly true and partly not, which informed his view of people's personal histories. In 1966, he earned a B.A. in history at Brooklyn College and then went on to the University of Minnesota, where he earned an M.A. in French Intellectual History in 1968. Soon after, he moved to Los Angeles, where he began teaching at California Institute of the Arts before earning his M. F. A. in Cinema and Professional Writing from the University of Southern California.

== Career ==
Since 1974, Klein has been a professor in the School of Critical Studies at the California Institute of the Arts, where he is on the faculty of both the Master's Program in Aesthetics and Politics and the Center for Integrated Media.

As layered systems that resemble certain genres of games and other media narrative formats, Klein's novels primarily offer literary alternatives. Having coined the term "scripted space" in 1998, Klein (with Margo Bistis) coined "Wunder roman" in 2012 to characterize a particular kind of picaresque novel whose parts function as a narrative engine.

In 2004, the Beall Center for Art and Technology organized a retrospective of Klein's work.

Klein has been a professor in the School of Critical Studies at California Institute of the Arts for over four decades.

== Works (books and multimedia projects) ==
- Tales of the Floating Class, Writings 1982-2017: Essays and Fictions on Globalization and Neo-Feudalism. Los Angeles. Golden Spike Press (2018)
- The Imaginary 20th Century co-authored with Margo Bistis- a book (2016) and media narrative (2014)
- Freud in Coney Island and Other Tales (2006)
- The Vatican to Vegas: The History of Special Effects (2004)
- Bleeding Through: Layers of Los Angeles, 1920-1986 (novella and DVD) (2003) Bleeding Through won a Special Award for New Media at the 2004 Split Film Festival. One of three nominations for the "Image Award" at transmediale.04, Bleeding Through won second prize.
- The History of Forgetting: Los Angeles and the Erasure of Memory (1997/2008)
- 7 Minutes: The Life and Death of the American Animated Cartoon (1993)
- Twentieth-Century Art Theory (1990)
- Twentieth Century Los Angeles: Power, Promotion, and Social Conflict (1990)

== Museum catalog essays ==
Klein has written catalog essays for Doug Aitken, Chip Lord, "The Whole Earth: California and the Disappearance of the Outside," "More Real? Art in the Age of Truthiness," "Exchange and Evolution: Worldwide Video Long Beach 1974-1999," Simon Denny, Kutluğ Ataman, Karina Nimmerfall, Rossen Crow, Peter Friedl, Christian Jankowski, Bjørn Melhus, George Stone, "Las Vegas Aesthetics," "Animations," "Au-Delà du Spectacle," "Reading California," Martin Kippenberger, and Helter Skelter.

== Digital media theory ==
Klein's most cited publications on digital media include "After the Crash: Imagining New Paradigms for the Study of Collective Memory," "Labor, Architecture and the New Feudalism: Urban Space as Experience," "Spaces Between Traveling Through Bleeds, Apertures, and Wormholes inside the Database Novel," and "Media as an Instrument of Power."
