= Cultural analysis =

Academic method applied to the norms and behaviors of a society

As a discipline, cultural analysis is based on using qualitative research methods of the arts, humanities, social sciences, in particular ethnography and anthropology, to collect data on cultural phenomena and to interpret cultural representations and practices; in an effort to gain new knowledge or understanding through analysis of that data and cultural processes. This is particularly useful for understanding and mapping trends, influences, effects, and affects within cultures.

== Themes ==
There are four themes to sociological cultural analysis:

- Adaptation and change: this refers to how well a certain culture adapts to its surroundings by being used and developed. Some examples of this are foods, tools, home, surroundings, art, etc. that show how the given culture adapted. Also, this aspect aims to show how the given culture makes the environment more accommodating.
- How culture is used to survive; how the given culture helps its members survive the environment.
- Holism and specificity: the ability to put the observations into a single collection, and presenting it in a coherent manner.
- Expressions: this focuses on studying the expressions and performance of everyday culture.

== In the humanities ==
Cultural analysis in the humanities developed at the intersection of cultural studies, history, comparative literature, art history, fine art, philosophy, literary theory, theology, anthropology, economy. It developed an interdisciplinary approach to the study of texts, images, films, and all related cultural practices. It offers an interdisciplinary approach to the analysis of cultural representations and practices.

== See also ==
- Cultural analytics
- Semiotics of culture
- Tartu–Moscow Semiotic School
