= Lance Strate =

Lance Strate in 2006

Lance A. Strate (born September 17, 1957) is an American writer and professor of communication and media studies at Fordham University. He was the 2015 Margaret E. and Paul F. Harron Endowed Chair in Communication at Villanova University, and in 2016 lectured at the School of Journalism and Communication at Henan University, in Kaifeng China.

== Career ==
Strate is one of the founders of the Media Ecology Association. He served as that organization's first president from 1998 to 2009, and was the co-founder of the MEA's journal, Explorations in Media Ecology, which he co-edited from 2001 to 2004, and edited alone from 2004 to 2007. He has been a trustee of the Institute of General Semantics since 2013, served as the IGS Executive Director from 2008 to 2011, and has served as IGS President since 2020. He was elected president of the New York Society for General Semantics in 2016 and served a five-year term. He is also a past president of the New York State Communication Association. He has been on the faculty of Fordham University since 1989, and served as department chair between 1997 and 2001. He has also taught at Fairleigh Dickinson University, New York University, William Paterson University, the University of Connecticut, and Adelphi University.

Strate is quoted frequently in the media about politics and social media, including in The New York Times, USA Today, Fortune Magazine, ABC News, South Dakota Public Radio (NPR), The National Post (Canada), The Jerusalem Post, and NHK Japanese Public Television.

Strate is author or co-author of eight books—including a book of poetry—and editor or co-editor of seven others. Translations of his work have appeared in French, Spanish, Italian, Portuguese, Hungarian, Hebrew, Mandarin, and the fictional Quenya language. His articles have appeared in The Guardian and are regularly featured in the Jewish Standard and The Times of Israel.

He has been president of the Congregation Adas Emuno, a Reform synagogue in New Jersey, since 2012.

== Education ==
Lance Strate earned a B.S. at Cornell University, an M.A. in Communication at Queens College (CUNY), and a Ph.D. in media ecology from New York University.

== Publications ==
- 1987, Neil Postman, Christine Nystrom, Lance Strate, and Charles Weingartner. Myths, Men, and Beer: An Analysis of Beer Commercials on Broadcast Television. Falls Church, VA: American Automobile Association Foundation for Traffic Safety.
- 2000, Robin Andersen and Lance Strate (Eds.). Critical Studies in Media Commercialism. London: Oxford University Press.
- 2003, Lance Strate, Ron Jacobson, and Stephanie Gibson (Eds.). Communication and Cyberspace: Social Interaction in an Electronic Environment (2nd ed.). Cresskill, NJ: Hampton Press, 2003.
- 2005, Lance Strate and Edward Wachtel (Eds.). The Legacy of McLuhan. Cresskill, NJ: Hampton Press
- 2006, Lance Strate. Echoes and Reflections: On Media Ecology as a Field of Study. Cresskill, NJ: Hampton Press.
- 2011, Lance Strate. On the Binding Biases of Time: And Other Essays on General Semantics and Media Ecology. Fort Worth, TX: Institute of General Semantics.
- 2012, Anton Corey and Lance Strate (Eds.) Korzybski and... New York: Institute of General Semantics.
- 2014, Lance Strate and Adeena Karasick (Eds.) The Medium is the Muse: Channeling Marshall McLuhan. Seattle: NeoPoiesis Press.
- 2014, Lance Strate. Amazing Ourselves to Death: Neil Postman's Brave New World Revisited. New York: Peter Lang.
- 2015, Lance Strate. Thunder at Darwin Station (poetry). Seattle: NeoPoiesis Press.
- 2016, Octavio Islas, Fernando Gutiérrez, and Lance Strate (Eds.) La Comprensión de los Medios en la Era Digital: Un Nuevo Análisis de la Obra de Marshall McLuhan. Mexico City: Alfaomega.
- 2016, Lance Strate. 麦克卢汉与媒介生态学 [McLuhan and Media Ecology] (original collection of essays published in Mandarin, Hu Julan, trans.). Zhengzhou, China: Henan University Press.
- 2017, Robert K. Logan, Corey Anton and Lance Strate (Eds.) Taking Up McLuhan's Cause: Perspectives on Media and Formal Causality. Bristol, UK: Intellect.
- 2017, Lance Strate. Media Ecology: An Approach to Understanding the Human Condition. New York: Peter Lang.
- 2020, Lance Strate. Diatribal Writes of Passage in a World of Wintertextuality: Poems on Language, Media, and Life (but not as we know it). Forest Hills, NY: Institute of General Semantics.

== See also ==
- Robert P. Pula
