= Software studies =

Field of study

Software studies is an emerging interdisciplinary research field, which studies software systems and their social and cultural effects. The implementation and use of software has been studied in recent fields such as cyberculture, Internet studies, new media studies, and digital culture, yet prior to software studies, software was rarely ever addressed as a distinct object of study. To study software as an artifact, software studies draws upon methods and theory from the digital humanities and from computational perspectives on software. Methodologically, software studies usually differs from the approaches of computer science and software engineering, which concern themselves primarily with software in information theory and in practical application; however, these fields all share an emphasis on computer literacy, particularly in the areas of programming and source code. This emphasis on analysing software sources and processes (rather than interfaces) often distinguishes software studies from new media studies, which is usually restricted to discussions of interfaces and observable effects.

== History ==
The conceptual origins of software studies include Marshall McLuhan's focus on the role of media in themselves, rather than the content of media platforms, in shaping culture. Early references to the study of software as a cultural practice appear in Friedrich Kittler's essay, "Es gibt keine Software", Lev Manovich's Language of New Media, and Matthew Fuller's Behind the Blip: Essays on the Culture of Software. Much of the impetus for the development of software studies has come from video game studies, particularly platform studies, the study of video games and other software artifacts in their hardware and software contexts. New media art, software art, motion graphics, and computer-aided design are also significant software-based cultural practices, as is the creation of new protocols and platforms.

The first conference events in the emerging field were Software Studies Workshop 2006 and SoftWhere 2008.

In 2008, MIT Press launched a Software Studies book series with an edited volume of essays (Fuller's Software Studies: A Lexicon), and the first academic program was launched, (Lev Manovich, Benjamin H. Bratton, and Noah Wardrip-Fruin's "Software Studies Initiative" at U. California San Diego).

In 2011, a number of mainly British researchers established Computational Culture, an open-access peer-reviewed journal. The journal provides a platform for "inter-disciplinary enquiry into the nature of the culture of computational objects, practices, processes and structures."

== Related fields ==
Software studies is closely related to a number of other emerging fields in the digital humanities that explore functional components of technology from a social and cultural perspective. Software studies' focus is at the level of the entire program, specifically the relationship between interface and code. Notably related are critical code studies, which is more closely attuned to the code rather than the program, and platform studies, which investigates the relationships between hardware and software.

== See also ==
- Cultural studies
- Digital sociology
