= Andreas Kratky =

Media artist

Andreas Kratky is a media artist and associate professor in the Interactive Media and Games Division and the Media Arts and Practice Division of the School for Cinematic Arts of the University of Southern California. He was born in Berlin, Germany and currently lives and works in Berlin and Los Angeles. His work focuses on memory, database, and new forms of cinema, He is designer and co-director of several award-winning projects including That’s Kyogen (2001), Bleeding Through – Layers of Los Angeles 1920-1986 (2003), Soft Cinema (2004), and Title TK (2006).
