= List of Rhode Island School of Design people =

This is a list of notable people from the Rhode Island School of Design.

== Notable alumni ==
=== Academia ===
- Rebecca Allen (BFA 1975) — pioneer of early computer art, installation art, interface design, professor and chair for the UCLA Design Media Arts
- Deborah Berke (BFA 1975, BArch 1977, honorary Doctorate of Fine Arts 2005) — dean and professor at Yale School of Architecture
- Andrianna Campbell (BFA 2001) — art historian
- Preston Scott Cohen (BArch 1983) — architect; director of the Architecture degree program at the Harvard Graduate School of Design
- Victor De La Rosa (MFA 2004) — professor and director of the art department at San Francisco State University
- Allison Druin (BFA 1985) — associate provost for Research and Strategic Partnerships at the Pratt Institute, computer scientist, and human-computer interaction researcher
- Salima Hashmi (MAE 1990) — anti-nuclear weapons activist, dean of the National College of Arts
- Nell Irvin Painter (MFA Painting 2011) — Edwards Professor of American History Emerita at Princeton University
- Hashim Sarkis (BArch 1987) — dean, MIT School of Architecture and Planning
- Richard M. Sommer (BArch 1984, BFA 1983) — director, Global Cities Institute (present), dean, John H. Daniels Faculty of Architecture, Landscape and Design, University of Toronto (2009–2020), director of Urban Design and associate professor, Harvard Graduate School of Design (1998–2009)
- Nader Tehrani (BArch 1986) — dean, Irwin S. Chanin School of Architecture at Cooper Union (2015—present), professor and head of the Department of Architecture, MIT (2010–2014); principal and founder of NADAAA
- Ricardo Viera (MFA 1974) — professor of art at Lehigh University 1974–2018; director and chief curator of the Lehigh University Art Galleries (LUAG)

=== Business ===
- Brian Chesky (BFA 2004) — entrepreneur, CEO of Airbnb
- Joe Gebbia (BFA 2004) — entrepreneur, CPO of Airbnb
- Amy Globus — designer, entrepreneur, co-founder of the brand design studio, Team
- Angela Guzman (BFA 2006 / MFA 2009) — entrepreneur, graphic designer, UX/UI designer, and CEO and founder of Tijiko
- David Hanson (BFA) — roboticist and entrepreneur, founder and CEO of Hanson Robotics
- Willem Van Lancker (BFA 2010) — entrepreneur, founder of Oyster
- Jessica Walsh (BFA Graphic Design 2008) — founder of the creative agency &Walsh

=== Politics ===
- Samuel Azzinaro — member of the Rhode Island House of Representatives
- John Cebrowski — member of the New Hampshire House of Representatives
- Chris Walsh — member of the Massachusetts House of Representatives

–

=== Architecture ===
- Raëd Abillama (BFA 1992; BArch 1993) — Lebanon-based architect
- Deborah Berke (BFA 1975; BArch 1977; honorary Doctorate of Fine Arts 2005) — dean of Yale School of Architecture; principal of Deborah Berke Partners
- Preston Scott Cohen (BArch 1983) — Gerald M. McCue Professor in Architecture at Harvard Graduate School of Design; principal of Preston Scott Cohen, Inc.
- Jonathan L. Foote (1959) — architect
- Frances Henley (1897) — first woman to independently practice architecture in Rhode Island
- Allan Merrick Jeffers — architect, designer of the Alberta Legislature Building
- Bernard Khoury (BFA 1990; BArch 1991) — Lebanese architect
- Richard Levine (BArch 1962) — professor, green architect, and sustainability pioneer
- Alice Malhiot (BArch 1910) — believed to be the first Canadian woman to graduate from an architectural school
- Michael Maltzan (BArch) — principal and founder of Michael Maltzan Architecture
- Sam Posey (BFA Painting 1966) — New England car racer, painter and architect
- Ira Rakatansky (BArch 1942) — Providence-based architect
- Hashim Sarkis (BArch 1987) — architect
- Richard M. Sommer (BArch 1984, BFA 1983) — director, Global Cities Institute (present), dean, John H. Daniels Faculty of Architecture, Landscape and Design, University of Toronto (2009–2020), director of Urban Design and associate professor, Harvard Graduate School of Design (1998–2009)
- Nader Tehrani (BArch 1986) — dean, the Irwin S. Chanin School of Architecture of the Cooper Union (2015—present), professor and head of the Department of Architecture, MIT (2010–2014); principal and founder of NADAAA
- Veronika Valk (1997) — Estonian architect
- Clifford Wiens (BArch 1954) — Canadian architect

=== Interior design ===
- Michael Gabellini (BArch 1981) — architect and interior designer, teacher at the Parsons School of Design
- Glenn Gissler (BArch 1984) — designer
- Adam Charlap Hyman (BArch 2010) — designer, architect, and artist
- Mary Richardson Kennedy — interior designer and architect
- Zoë Kestan — designer

=== Fine art ===
==== Art collectives ====
- Forcefield
  - Matt Brinkman (BFA 1997) — artist
  - Jim Drain (BFA 1998) — artist
  - Ara Peterson (BFA 1997) — artist

==== Art collectors and art dealers ====
- Mary Boone (BFA 1973) — owner of Mary Boone Gallery
- David Whitney (B. Interior Architecture 1963) — art collector and curator; longtime companion of architect Philip Johnson

==== Digital arts ====
- Rebecca Allen (BFA 1975) — pioneer of early computer art, installation art, interface design, and professor

==== Guggenheim fellowships ====
- Natalia Almada (MFA 2001) — 2008 Guggenheim Fellow
- Janine Antoni (MFA 2011) — 2011 Guggenheim Fellow
- SoHyun Bae (BFA 1990) — 2007 Guggenheim Fellow
- Karin Davie (MFA 1989 — 2015 Guggenheim Fellow
- Nicole Eisenman (BFA 1987) — 1996 Guggenheim Fellow
- Odette England (MFA 2012) — 2022 Guggenheim Fellow
- Amy Feldman (BFA 2003) — 2018 Guggenheim Fellow
- Emmet Gowin (MFA 1967) — 1974 Guggenheim Fellow
- Elliott Hundley (BFA 1997) — 2019 Guggenheim Fellow
- Justin Kimball (BFA 1985) — 2003 Guggenheim Fellow
- Deana Lawson (MFA 2004) — 2013 Guggenheim Fellow
- Arno Rafael Minkkinen (MFA 1974) — 2015 Guggenheim Fellow
- Jackie Saccoccio (BFA 1985) — 2000 Guggenheim Fellow
- Judith Schaechter (BFA 1983) — 2005 Guggenheim Fellow
- Arlene Shechet (MFA 1978) — 2004 Guggenheim Fellow

==== MacArthur fellowships ====
- Natalia Almada (MFA 2001) — photographer, filmmaker, 2012 MacArthur Fellow
- Janine Antoni (BFA 1989) — artist, 1998 MacArthur Fellow
- James Carpenter (BFA 1972) — glass sculptor, designer, 2004 MacArthur Fellow
- Nicole Eisenman (BFA 1987) — painter, 2015 MacArthur Fellow
- David Macaulay (BFA 1969) — writer, illustrator, 2006 MacArthur Fellow
- Josiah McElheny (BFA 1988) — artist, sculptor, 2006 MacArthur Fellow
- Julie Mehretu (MFA 1997) — artist, 2005 MacArthur Fellow
- Anna Schuleit (BFA 1998) — artist, 2006 MacArthur Fellow
- Shazia Sikander (MFA 1995) — artist, MacArthur Fellow
- Kara Walker (MFA 1994) — artist, 1997 MacArthur Fellow

==== Multimedia, mixed media and installation ====
- Romeo Alaeff (MFA 1996) — artist, author, animation/film editor
- Ricci Albenda (MFA 1988) — artist
- Janine Antoni (MFA 1989) — artist
- Korakrit Arunanondchai (BFA 2009) — artist
- Nicole Bartelme (BFA 1989) — artist, film festival creator
- Ib Benoh (MFA 1980) — artist
- Sarah Bostwick (BFA 2001) — artist
- Brian Bress (BFA 1998) — artist
- Dan Colen (BFA Painting 2001) — NYC-based artist
- Cheryl Donegan (BFA Painting) — contemporary artist
- Jim Drain (BFA Sculpture, 1998) — artist, often makes work collaboratively
- Benjamin Edwards (MFA 1997) — artist
- Shepard Fairey (BFA 1992) — street artist, graphic designer, activist and illustrator
- Lauren Geremia (BFA 2004) — interior designer
- Jenny Holzer (MFA 1977) — installation artist
- Roni Horn (BFA 1975) — artist
- Elliott Hundley (BFA 1997) — artist
- David Kracov (BFA 1990) — sculptor, painter, and animator
- Courtney M. Leonard (MFA 2008) — multimedia artist and filmmaker
- Mike Libby (BFA 1999) — artist
- John Miller — artist
- Liz Miller — artist
- Bathsheba Okwenje — Ugandan artist
- Mary Curtis Ratcliff (BFA 1967) — artist
- Marcus Reichert (BFA 1970) — artist
- Mark Shasha (BFA 1983) — artist
- Shahzia Sikander (MFA 1995) — artist
- Phillip K. Smith III (BFA 1996) — artist
- Tavares Strachan (BFA 2003) — artist
- Do-Ho Suh (BFA 1994) — artist
- Susan Thayer (BFA 1982) — ceramic artist
- Ryan Trecartin (BFA 2004) — artist
- Katie Vida (BFA 2004) — interdisciplinary artist and curator
- Kara Walker (MFA 1994) — artist
- Jordan Wolfson (BFA 2003) — artist, sculptor
- Andrea Zittel (MFA 1990) — artist
- Kevin Zucker (BFA 2000) — artist

==== Painting ====
- Daniel Arango (MFA 2010) — painter, visual artist
- Miriam Beerman (BFA 1945) — painter, visual artist
- David Bowes (attended, late 1970s) — painter
- Joe Bradley (BFA 1999) — painter
- Erin Castellan (BFA) — painter
- Leelee Chan (MFA 2009) — sculptor, mixed media artist
- Liz Deschenes (BFA 1988) — artist
- John Dilg (BFA 1969) — painter
- Alex Dodge (BFA 2001) — painter
- Arthur S. Douglas (enrolled 1878) — member of the inaugural class; student teacher
- Nicole Eisenman (BFA 1987) — painter
- Herbert Cyrus Farnum — 19th- and early 20th-century painter in Rhode Island
- Aaron Gilbert (BFA 2005) — painter
- Suzy González (MFA 2015) — painter
- Sasha Gordon (BFA, 2020) — painter
- Bruce Helander (BFA 1969, MFA 1972) — painter, collage and assemblage
- Adam Helms — artist, painter
- Jessica Hess (BFA Illustration 2003) — realist painter
- Håvard Homstvedt (BFA 2000) — painter
- Shara Hughes (BFA 2004) — painter
- Yvonne Jacquette — painter and printmaker
- Betsy Kaufman (BFA) — painter and sculptor
- Arghavan Khosravi (MFA Painting 2018) — painter, sculptor, and illustrator
- Arman Manookian (attended in the 1920s) — painter and muralist active in Honolulu
- Julie Mehretu (MFA 1997) — artist, densely layered prints and paintings
- Richard Merkin (MFA 1963) — painter, The New Yorker contributor, prof. emeritus RISD
- Matt Mignanelli (BFA 2005) — painter
- D. Jeffrey Mims — painter
- Sarah Minnick — chef and restaurateur
- Laura Owens (BFA 1992) — painter
- Sam Posey (BFA Painting 1966) — New England car racer, painter and architect
- Deborah Poynton — realist painter, attended RISD for two years, 1987–1989, but did not graduate
- Francis Quirk (BFA 1930) — painter
- Anton Refregier (1925) — Russian-American social realist
- Clare Rojas (BFA 1998) — artist, painter
- Schandra Singh (BFA 1999) — painter
- Sonya Sklaroff (BFA 1992) — artist, painter
- Anne Morgan Spalter (MFA 1992) — new media artist
- Andrew Stevovich (BFA 1970) — artist
- Taravat Talepasand (BFA, 2001) — Iranian-American artist
- Kurt Wenner — anamorphic street painter
- Anna Weyant (BFA, 2017) — painter
- Mabel May Woodward (c. 1897) — impressionist
- William Woodward — impressionist
- Edmund Yaghjian (BFA 1930) — painter, teacher at the Art Students League of New York, and chair at the University of South Carolina
- Zio Ziegler (BFA 2010) — muralist and painter

==== Photography ====
- David Akiba (MFA) — photographer and teacher in the Boston area
- Lukas Birk (MFA Printmaking 2017) — photographer, author, archivist
- Bill Burke (BFA 1968, MFA 1970) — documentary photographer
- Talia Chetrit (MFA 2008) — photographer
- Linda Connor (BFA) — large-format photographer, currently teaches at the San Francisco Art Institute
- Jim Dow (MFA 1968) — photographer
- Odette England (MFA 2012) — photographer, curator, writer, currently teaches at Brown University
- Emmet Gowin (MFA 1967) — photographer
- Jill Greenberg (BFA 1989) — photographer
- Kathy Grove (BFA 1970) — photographer
- Henry Horenstein (BFA 1971, MFA 1973) — photographer, author, currently teaches at Rhode Island School of Design
- Acacia Johnson (BFA 2014) — photographer
- Deana Lawson (MFA Photography 2004) — photographer, currently teaches at Princeton
- Leigh Ledare (BFA 2000) — photographer
- Matthew Leifheit (BFA Photography 2011) — photographer, writer, magazine editor, publisher, and professor
- Laura McPhee (MFA 1986) — photographer and teacher at Massachusetts College of Art
- Arno Rafael Minkkinen (MFA 1974) — photographer
- RaMell Ross (MFA 2014) — photographer, filmmaker
- David Benjamin Sherry (BFA Photography 2003) — landscape photographer
- Jeffrey Silverthorne (BFA 1969, MAT 1970, MFA 1977) — photographer
- Sarah Small (BFA 2001) — artist, composer, singer, filmmaker, photographer, and performer
- Rachel Stern (BFA 2011) — photographer and educator
- Jane Tuckerman (MFA) — photographer, taught at Harvard University
- Timothy White (BFA 1979) — celebrity photographer
- Francesca Woodman (BFA 1978) — photographer
- Melissa Zexter — artist known for her embroidered photographs

==== Printmaking ====
- Val Britton (BFA Printmaking 1999) — artist, works on paper and installations
- Brian Chippendale (no degree) — musician with Lightning Bolt, graphic artist, poster artist
- Arthur Deshaies (BFA 1948) — artist, printmaker
- Helen C. Frederick (BFA Illustration 1967, MFA Painting 1969) — printmaker, papermaker, professor, and founder of Pyramid Atlantic Art Center
- Wilmer Angier Jennings (c. 1935) — wood engraver, printmaker, jewelry designer, and painter; one of the first African-Americans to matriculate at RISD
- Jane Kim (BFA Printmaking 2003) — scientific illustrations and murals promoting advocacy of the natural world
- Sonia Romero (BFA Printmaking 2002) — printmaking, murals and public art in Los Angeles
- Pippi Zornoza (BFA Printmaking 2001) — poster artist and co-founder of the Dirt Palace feminist artist collective

==== Sculpture ====
- Frederick Warren Allen — sculptor
- Tanya Aguiñiga (MFA 2005) — sculptor and installation artist
- Janine Antoni (MFA 1989) — studied sculpture, known for using her body as a creative instrument and site of meaning in works that blend performance, sculpture, video and photography
- Ross Palmer Beecher — studied sculpture, known for art from recycled and found objects
- Howard Ben Tré (MFA 1980) — glass sculptor
- John Benson — studied sculpture, known for stone carving and typeface design
- Huma Bhabha (BFA 1985) — sculptor in New York
- Nadine M. DeLawrence (BFA) — known for large-scale installation art made of metal, influenced by African culture
- Karen LaMonte (BFA 1990) — glass sculptor, known for representations of women’s dresses with the wearer absent

=== Fashion ===
- Diana Eng (BFA 2005) — fashion designer; contestant on Project Runway
- Katie Gallagher (BFA 2009) — fashion designer
- Robert Geller (BFA 2001) — fashion designer; recipient of the GQ/CFDA Best New Menswear Designer Award 2009
- Mary Katrantzou — fashion designer
- Nicole Miller (BFA 1973) — fashion designer
- Ryan Jude Novelline (BFA 2012) — contemporary artist; fashion designer
- Jill Stuart — fashion designer

=== Film and television ===
- Ilene Chaiken (BFA 1979) — producer and writer; co-creator of The L Word, adapted The Handmaid's Tale for television, show-runner Empire
- Ben Coccio (BFA 1997) — director of Zero Day
- Martha Coolidge (BFA 1968) — director, Valley Girl (1983), Real Genius (1985), The Prince and Me (2004), Material Girls (2006)
- Michael Dante DiMartino (BFA FAV 1996) — animator, writer, producer, and director; co-creator of Avatar: The Last Airbender
- Dan Golden (BFA 1994) — filmmaker and composer of Oscar-nominated film Feral
- Heather Henson (BFA 1995) — puppeteer and owner of IBEX Puppetry, on the board of The Jim Henson Company
- Christy Karacas (BFA FAV 1997) — animator, writer, producer, director, and musician; co-creator of Superjail!
- Ellen Kuras — cinematographer
- Mary Lambert (BFA 1974) — director, Pet Sematary (1989), The in Crowd (2000)
- Seth MacFarlane (BFA FAV 1995) — filmmaker, actor, animator, comedian, and singer; creator of Family Guy, American Dad!, The Cleveland Show, The Orville, and writer-director of Ted and Ted 2
- Angus MacLane (BFA 1997) — animator, character designer, and director; co-director of Finding Dory, director of Lightyear
- Joanna Priestley (attended 1972–1973) — animator
- Robert Richardson (BFA 1979) — Academy Award-winning cinematographer
- Mark Shasha (BFA 1983) — artist, author, illustrator, actor
- Leah Shore (BFA 2009) — animator, film director, known for multiple award-winning short films Old Man and I Love You So Much
- Daniel Sousa (BFA 1994) — animator, director of Oscar-nominated film Feral
- Helen Stickler (BFA 1991) — director
- Charles Stone III (BFA 1988) — director, Drumline (2002); creator of "Whassup?" Anheuser-Busch Budweiser commercial campaign
- Gus Van Sant (BFA 1975) — director, My Own Private Idaho (1991), Good Will Hunting (1997), Finding Forrester (2000), Elephant (2003) Last Days (2006), Milk (2008)
- Todd Verow (BFA 1989) — director

==== Actors ====
- James Franco (MFA 2012) — actor, artist
- Sam Hyde (BFA 2007) — actor, writer, comedian and co-creator of Million Dollar Extreme Presents: World Peace
- Jemima Kirke (BFA 2008) — artist, actor, TV show Girls
- Martin Mull (BFA 1965, MFA 1967) — actor, comedian, painter
- Ben Powers — actor on the CBS sitcom Good Times (1978–79)
- Charles Rocket (c.1967–1972) — former Saturday Night Live cast member; actor

=== Furniture design ===
- Amy Devers (MFA Furniture Design 2001) — furniture designer; television personality
- Hank Gilpin (MFA 1973) — furniture designer and woodworker
- Misha Kahn (BFA Furniture Design 2011) — artist
- Judy Kensley McKie (BFA Painting 1966) — furniture designer
- Brodie Neill (MFA Furniture Design 2004) — furniture designer
- Josh Owen (MFA Furniture Design 1998) — furniture designer
- Emi Ozawa (MFA Furniture Design 1992) — artist
- Matthias Pliessnig (BFA Furniture Design 2003) — furniture designer
- Jessi Reaves (BFA Painting 2010) — furniture designer and sculptor
- Janice Smith (MFA 1981) — furniture designer
- Rosanne Somerson (BFA Industrial Design 1976) — furniture designer; RISD professor, Furniture Design department head, provost, and RISD president 2015–2021
- Charles Tsunashima (BFA Industrial Design 1997, MFA Textiles 2000) — furniture designer, Tama Arts University faculty
- David Wiseman (BFA Furniture Design 2003) — home decorative arts and craft

=== Glass ===
- Martin Blank (BFA 1984) — glass artist
- Dale Chihuly (MFA 1968) — glass artist; founder of glass art program at the Rhode Island School of Design; co-founder of Pilchuck Glass School
- Katherine Gray (MFA 1992) — glass artist
- Paul Housberg (BFA 1975, MFA 1979) — fused and kiln-formed glass artist
- Josiah McElheny (BFA 1988) — glass sculptor, MacArthur Fellow
- Benjamin Moore (MFA 1977) — glass artist, teacher
- Mary Shaffer (BFA 1965, Illustration) — glass artist
- Therman Statom (BFA 1974) — glass artist
- Toots Zynsky (BFA 1973) — glass artist

=== Graphic design ===
- Tobias Frere-Jones (BFA 1992) — typographer, designer of Gotham
- Tom Geismar (BFA) — identity designer and corporate identity pioneer; designed marks for NBC, Mobil, Chase, Xerox, and MoMA
- Prince Carl Philip, Duke of Värmland (Carl Philip Edmund Bertil) (2007–2008, no degree) — graphic design studies for one year
- Michael H. Riley — Emmy Award-nominated designer and founder of design company Shine
- Michael Rock (MFA 1984) — co-founder and partner of 2x4; Cooper-Hewitt National Design Award recipient
- Carol Twombly (1984) — typographer, designer of Trajan, Myriad and Adobe Caslon

=== Illustration ===
- Roz Chast (BFA 1977) — cartoonist
- Elizabeth Updike Cobblah (MAT) — illustrator and teacher, daughter of John Updike
- Emiko Davies (BFA Printmaking 2002) — illustrator, food writer and food journalist
- Christopher Denise (BFA 1990) — illustrator of children's books, including many in the Redwall series
- Shepard Fairey (BFA 1992) — street artist, graphic designer
- Jon Foster (BFA 1989) — illustrator
- Steven Kellogg (BFA 1963) — children's book illustrator
- Bryan Konietzko (BFA 1998) — animator, writer, producer, and director; co-creator of Avatar: The Last Airbender
- Cynthia Lahti (BFA 1985) — artist
- Sonny Liew (BFA 2001) — comic book writer, artist
- Grace Lin (BFA 1996) — writer, illustrator
- Jason Lutes (BFA 1991) — comic book writer and artist, creator of the series Berlin
- Fred Lynch (BFA 1986) — journalistic illustrator
- David Macaulay (BArch 1969) — writer, illustrator, 2006 MacArthur Fellow
- David Mazzucchelli — comic artist and author of Asterios Polyp
- Kelly Murphy (BFA 1999) — writer, illustrator
- Antoine Revoy (BFA 1999) — writer, illustrator
- Paolo Rivera (BFA 2003) — comic book artist
- Brian Selznick (BFA 1988) — writer, illustrator
- Mark Shasha (BFA Illustration 1983) — writer, illustrator
- Walt Simonson (BFA 1972) — comic book writer, artist
- Chris Van Allsburg (BFA) — children's book illustrator, Caldecott winner
- David Wiesner (BFA 1977) — illustrator, Caldecott winner
- Kevin James Wilson (BFA 1981) — 2D artist and art teacher

=== Industrial design ===
- Archduke Dominic of Austria, Prince of Hungary and Bohemia, Prince of Tuscany (BFA Industrial Design, 1960)
- David Hanson (BFA FAV 1997) — robotics designer of Sophia
- Charles Tsunashima (BFA Industrial Design, 1997, MFA Textiles 2000) — industrial designer, Tama Art University faculty

=== Literature ===
- Emiko Davies (BFA Printmaking 2002) — cookbook author, food journalist and food blogger, known for a focus on regional Italian food
- Charlotte Perkins Gilman (attended 1878) — author of The Yellow Wallpaper; feminist
- Rachel B. Glaser (BFA 2005) — writer, "Pee on Water", "Paulina and Fran"
- Kenneth Goldsmith (BFA 1984) — poet, WFMU DJ, founding editor of UbuWeb
- Sarah Mantell (BFA) — playwright
- Manjushree Thapa (BFA 1989) — writer, Forget Kathmandu, Tilled Earth, Tutor Of History

=== Music ===
- Oliver Ackermann (BFA Industrial Design) — musician, A Place to Bury Strangers
- Paul Curreri (BFA 1998) — songwriter / guitarist / producer
- Chris Keating (BFA Film, Animation, Video, 2004) — musician, Yeasayer
- Justin Lo (BFA 1999) — Hong Kong singer, composer and record producer
- Marissa Nadler (MFA 2003, MAT 2004) — singer-songwriter
- Heather Nova (BFA 1989) — singer-songwriter
- Jesse Sykes (BFA 1989) — singer-songwriter
- Veronica Vasicka (BFA 1997) — DJ, radio show host, producer and owner of Minimal Wave Records

==== Musical bands ====
The following bands were formed by students attending RISD.

- Black Dice — formed in 1997
  - Hisham Bharoocha (BFA 1998) — artist and musician, former member of Lightning Bolt
  - Sebastian Blanck (BFA 1998) — artist and musician
- Fang Island — formed in 2005
- Les Savy Fav — formed in 1995
  - Syd Butler
  - Tim Harrington
- Lightning Bolt — formed in 1994
- Hisham Bharoocha (BFA 1998) — artist and musician, former member of Black Dice
  - Brian Chippendale (no degree) — artist, founded Fort Thunder
  - Brian Gibson (BFA 1998) — artist
- Rubber Rodeo — formed in 1980
- Talking Heads — formed in 1974
  - David Byrne (no degree)
  - Chris Frantz (BFA 1974)
  - Tina Weymouth (BFA 1974)

=== Textiles ===
- Pia Camil (BFA 2003) — contemporary artist
- Cynthia Schira (BFA 1956) — textile artist known for adding relief and irregularity to weavings made on a Jacquard loom
- Ruth Adler Schnee (BFA 1945) — a founding figure of contemporary textile design in America, best known for her modern prints and abstract-patterns of organic and geometric forms

== Notable current and past faculty ==
=== Fine Arts Division ===
The Fine Arts Division includes the following departments; ceramics, film/animation/video, glass, illustration, jewelry and metalsmithing, painting, photography, printmaking, sculpture, and textiles.

==== Ceramics ====
- Otto and Vivika Heino — ceramics

==== Film, animation, video ====
- Yvonne Andersen — professor in animation, department head
- Janet Perlman — animator, Oscar nominee for The Tender Tale of Cinderella Penguin
- Steven Subotnick — professor in animation

==== Illustration ====
- Jean Blackburn (BFA 1979) — archaeological illustrator, sculptor, and painter
- Lars Grant-West — illustrator for Wizards of the Coast
- Fred Lynch (BFA 1986) — journalistic illustrator
- David Macaulay (BArch 1969) — illustrator and author
- Barry Moser — illustrator
- Kelly Murphy (BFA 1999) — illustrator and author, E.B. White Award winner for Masterpiece
- Antoine Revoy (BFA film/animation/video 1999) — graphic novelist
- Mahler B. Ryder — mixed media collage, sculptor, jazz pianist, taught illustration 1969–1992
- Chris Van Allsburg (MFA sculpture 1975) — children's book author/illustrator, Caldecott winner for Jumanji and The Polar Express

==== Jewelry and metalsmithing ====
- John Prip — silver design

==== Painting ====
- Richard Merkin (MFA 1963) — professor emeritus, painter
- Duane Slick — painting faculty since 1995
- George William Whitaker — first instructor of oil painting
- Mabel May Woodward — painting faculty for over 20 years; during the early 20th century introduced the "action class," in which students studied the human figure as a machine rather than as a stationary object

==== Photography ====
- Diane Arbus — photographer
- Harry Callahan — photographer, former chair of the Department of Photography
- Joe Deal — photographer, professor emeritus, former provost
- Ann Fessler — author, filmmaker, installation artist, former department head and graduate program director
- Henry Horenstein — photographer
- Aaron Siskind — abstract expressionist photographer who, with Callahan, founded the photography department at RISD

==== Printmaking ====
- Andrew Raftery — engraver; has taught in the printmaking and painting department since 1991
- Brian Shure — master printmaker, realist painter, teaching 1996–2016
- Carol Wax — printmaker, visiting artist and faculty in the printmaking department

==== Sculpture ====
- Gilbert Franklin (1919–2004; BFA 1941) — sculptor, teacher 1942–1985, and former dean of fine arts

=== Architecture and Design Division ===
The Architecture and Design Division includes the following departments; apparel design, architecture, furniture design, graphic design, industrial design, and landscape architecture.

==== Apparel design ====
- Katie Gallagher — fashion designer
- Daniela Lalita — musician, model, and artist
- Nicole Miller — fashion designer and businesswoman

==== Architecture ====
- Thomas Bosworth — former chair of Department of Architecture; Seattle architect; professor emeritus, University of Washington
- James Ingo Freed — architect
- Norman Isham — Rhode Island historical architect
- Manfredi Nicoletti — Italian architect
- Monica Ponce de Leon — architect, designer of the Fleet Library
- Jane Silverstein Ries — first woman licensed in Colorado as a professional landscape architect
- Galia Solomonoff — Argentinian-born architect
- Friedrich St. Florian — architect, designer of National World War II Memorial
- Michael Webb — architect

==== Furniture design ====
- Tage Frid — RISD professor of Woodworking and Furniture design 1962–1985; also connected to the industrial design program
- Jens Risom — furniture design

==== Graphic design ====
- John Howard Benson — calligraphy, design theory, sculpture
- Malcolm Grear — professor emeritus, graphic designer
- Mihai Nadin — theorist, semiotics, computational design, HCI
- Ootje Oxenaar — Dutch graphic designer, designer of acclaimed but now vanished Dutch currency
- Michael Rock — graphic designer; writer; design professor at Yale University MFA graphic design program
- Nancy Skolos — graphic designer, co-founder of Skolos-Wedell studios, teaching at RISD since 1989
- Paul Soulellis — graphic designer, artist, publisher and teacher; founder of Library of the Printed Web

==== Industrial design ====
- Marc Harrison — industrial designer and pioneer of universal design and RISD professor of industrial design until his death in 1998
- Victor Papanek — designer and early pioneer of universal design
- Peter Yeadon — industrial designer

==== Landscape architecture ====
- Mikyoung Kim — landscape architect
- Elizabeth Greenleaf Pattee — landscape architect

=== Experimental and Foundation Studies Division ===
- Dawn Clements — foundations faculty
- Mark Milloff — painter, foundations faculty

=== Liberal Arts Division ===
- Mairéad Byrne — poet
- Jhumpa Lahiri — creative writing, author of the novel The Namesake
