= Elizabeth Miller =

Elizabeth Miller may refer to:

- Elizabeth Miller (Canadian academic) (1939–2022), professor at Memorial University of Newfoundland, specializing in Dracula
- Elizabeth Cleveland Miller (1889–1936), American children's author
- Elizabeth Miller (novelist) (1878–1961), American Hoosier novelist
- Elizabeth Miller (epidemiologist), British epidemiologist with expertise in vaccination
- Elizabeth Miller (geologist), structural geologist and emeritus professor at Stanford University
- Liz Miller (born 1957), British physician and writer
- Liz Miller (artist), American artist
- Elizabeth Miller (politician) (born 1967), Australian state politician
- Elizabeth C. Miller (1920–1987), American biochemist and cancer researcher
- Elizabeth C. Miller (ecologist), discoverer of Hemidactylus principensis
- Elizabeth Ruby Miller (1905–1988), American politician
- Elizabeth Smith Miller (1842–1911), advocate and financial supporter of the women's rights movement
- Elizabeth Miller (1907–1977), also known as Lee Miller, American photographer
- Betsy Miller (1792–1864), Scottish merchant

== See also ==
- Betty Miller (disambiguation)
- Miller (surname)
