= Gissler =

Gissler is a surname. Notable people with the surname include:

- August Gissler (1857–1935), German adventurer and treasure hunter
- Glenn Gissler (born 1957), American interior designer
- Sig Gissler, American professor of journalism
