= Poynton (surname) =

Poynton is a surname. Notable people with the surname include:

- Adrian Poynton (born 1979), British writer and comedian
- Alexander Poynton (1853–1935), Australian politician
- Arthur Blackburne Poynton (1867–1944), British classical scholar
- Sir Arthur Hilton Poynton (1905–1996), British civil servant
- Cecil Poynton (1901–1983), English association football player
- Charles Poynton (born 1950), Canadian technical consultant and writer
- Dorothy Poynton-Hill (1915–1995), American diver
- Gregor Poynton, Scottish politician
- Harold Poynton (1936–2018), English rugby league footballer
- Deborah Poynton (born 1970), South African painter
- Thomas Poynton (born 1989), English cricketer
- Tommy Poynton (1885–1942), English rugby league footballer
