= Katie Gallagher (disambiguation) =

Katie Gallagher (1986–2022) was an American fashion designer.

Katie Gallagher may also refer to:

- Katie Gallagher, a contestant on Survivor: Palau
- Katie Gallagher, a pen name of American author Sarah Addison Allen

== See also ==
- Katy Gallagher, an Australian politician
