= Progressive segmented frame =

Scheme to handle progressive scan video using interlaced equipment

Progressive segmented frame (PsF, sF, SF) is a scheme designed to acquire, store, modify, and distribute progressive scan video using interlaced equipment.

With PsF, a progressive frame is divided into two segments, with the odd lines in one segment and the even lines in the other segment. Technically, the segments are equivalent to interlaced fields, but unlike native interlaced video, there is no motion between the two fields that make up the video frame: both fields represent the same instant in time. This technique allows for a progressive picture to be processed through the same electronic circuitry that is used to store, process and route interlaced video.

The term progressive segmented frame is used predominantly in relation to high definition video. In standard-definition video, which typically uses interlaced scanning, it is also known as quasi-interlace, progressive recording or movie mode. Other names for PsF used by electronic equipment manufacturers include progressive recording (Sony), progressive scan mode (Sony), progressive shutter mode (Sony), frame shutter mode (Sony), frame mode (Panasonic and Canon), Digital Cinema (Panasonic), Pro-Cinema (Panasonic) and Cinema mode (Canon).

== History ==
PsF was designed to simplify the conversion of cinematic content to different video standards, and as a means of video exchange between networks and broadcasters worldwide. Brought to life by the movie industry in the end of the 1990s, the original PsF specification was focused on 24 frame/s content resulting in existing interlaced equipment having to be modified for 48 Hz scanning rate in order to work properly with 24 frame/s content.

Not everyone welcomed the PsF standard, however. Some industry observers maintained that native 24p processing would have been a better and cleaner choice. Charles Poynton, an authority in digital television, made the following remark in his book: "Proponents of [PsF] scheme claim compatibility with interlaced processing and recording equipment, a dubious objective in my view." William F. Schreiber, former Director of the Advanced Television Research Program at MIT, suspected that the continued advocacy of interlaced equipment originated from consumer electronics companies that were trying to get back the substantial investments they had made in obsolete technology.

== Usage ==
Despite the criticism, PsF quickly became a de facto standard for high-quality film-to-video transfer. One of the documented examples of PsF usage is the 2003 transfer of the film "Terminator 2: Judgment Day" to DVD, performed by Artisan Entertainment and THX. The original 24 frame/s movie was converted to PsF format and recorded to HD-D5 videotapes. This allowed for the creation of a digital master that was nearly identical to the original film, and made it possible to edit digitally at the native frame rate. The same digital master appears to be used for the 2006 Blu-ray Disc transfer of the movie.

PsF has been recognized by Recommendation ITU-R BT.709 as a legitimate way to transport progressive frames within an interlaced system. 25PsF and 30PsF rates have been added to the specification in addition to the more established 24PsF. "Fractional" frame rates, having the above values divided by 1.001, are also permitted; the resulting 23.976PsF and 29.97PsF rates are used in 59.94 Hz systems. No change from 59.94 Hz systems to 60 Hz (although provided for and anticipated) has occurred, allowing display on analog NTSC color televisions and monitors after down-conversion and encoding.

PsF became a means of initial image acquisition in professional Sony video cameras. It is employed in HDCAM and XDCAM video cameras, including the HDW-F900 CineAlta camera which was used by George Lucas for creating Star Wars, Episode 2, and by Alexander Sokurov for creating Russian Ark fully in the digital domain.

== Similar technologies ==
=== 2:2 pulldown (TV broadcast) ===
2:2 pulldown is widely used in 50 Hz interlaced television systems to broadcast progressive material recorded at 25 frame/s, but is rarely used in 60 Hz systems. The 2:2 pulldown scheme had originally been designed for interlaced displays, so fine vertical details are usually filtered out to minimize interline twitter. PsF has been designed to transport progressive content and, therefore, does not employ such filtering.

=== PALplus film mode (TV broadcast) ===
PALplus utilizes a digital stream embedded in the interlaced analog TV signal called widescreen signaling, which, among other data, describes whether the signal should be treated as interlaced ("camera mode") or progressive ("film mode").

=== Video recorders ===
PsF is utilized in some DV, HDV and AVCHD camcorders for 25-frame/s and 30-frame/s progressive-scan recording. To achieve this, the camera acquires 30 (NTSC) or 25 (PAL) independent images per second. These images are output as 60 (NTSC) or 50 (PAL) interlaced fields. The result is a progressive-scan content, which is compatible with traditional interlaced scanning systems.

This is how Sony described the progressive recording mode in the operating guide for a 60 Hz ("NTSC") Sony DCR-HC96 camcorder:

Note on the progressive recording mode
In a normal TV broadcast, the screen is divided into 2 finer fields and these are displayed in turn, every 1/60 of a second. Thus, the actual picture displayed in an instant covers only half of the apparent picture area. In progressive recording, the picture is fully displayed with all the pixels.

The booklet for the 50 Hz ("PAL") Sony DSR-PD175P camcorder describes its progressive recording mode as follows:

Progressive Scan Mode
The 25p image captured by the sensor system is recorded as an interlaced signal by dividing each frame into two fields. This enables compatibility with current editing and monitoring equipment that only accept interlaced signals, while maintaining the quality of the 25p image.

The operating instructions for the 60 Hz ("NTSC") Panasonic PV-GS500 camcorder describe its progressive recording mode as follows:

Pro-Cinema function
In addition to the effects when the Wide function is used, images can also be recorded at a rate of 30 frames a second with a strobe-like effect.

The HDV Progressive Primer whitepaper mentions Progressive Segmented Frame mode:

Progressive Scan Mode
In this mode, the captured image is divided into two halves, then recorded or output as interlace signal. The halves are called segments, not fields, because there is no temporal difference between them. This method is also called as PsF (Progressive segmented Frame) recording. The Progressive Scan mode is suitable for the feature films, documentaries, music videos which have to be recorded as interlaced video for viewing on interlaced monitors, but want to offer “progressive-look” to their motion. Besides, the video taken in the Progressive Scan mode can be edited and output as true progressive video if needed.

Consumer camcorders as well as most professional camcorders do not use PsF to record 24-frame/s video; instead they either record it natively in progressive form or apply 2:3 pulldown.

Most video formats including professional ones utilize chroma subsampling to reduce amount of chroma information in a video, taking advantage of the human visual system's lower acuity for color differences than for luminance. Such a reduction improves compression of the video signal, which is always desirable because of storage and transmission limitations. To ensure compatibility with interlaced-based systems, chroma information in PsF video is sometimes recorded in interlaced format, despite that the content is progressive. This may result in interlaced artifacts being noticeable on colored objects.

== Variants ==
- 24PsF (48sF, 1080sf24, 1920×1080/24/1:1SF) is the original PsF format, which is used in professional equipment for film-to-video transfer, for high definition mastering and for video exchange between networks. This may be the first universal video standard that transcends continental boundaries, an area previously reserved for film.
- 25PsF (1080sf25, 1920×1080/25/1:1SF) is used in 50 Hz systems for production that originates on video and is targeted for television distribution.
- 29.97PsF (1080sf29, 1920×1080/29.97/1:1SF) formats are sometimes used in 60 Hz systems for sitcoms and music shows. 29.97PsF as well as 30PsF (30p, 1080sf30, 1920×1080/30/1:1SF) formats are gaining popularity as an acquisition format for Web video delivery, because most video hosting web sites cannot stream video with rates higher than 30 frame/s.
