= Arthur Douglas =

Arthur Douglas may refer to:

- Arthur Douglas (sportsman) (1902–1937), Irish cricketer and rugby union player
- Arthur Douglas (bishop) (1827–1905), bishop of Aberdeen and Orkney, 1883–1905
- Arthur S. Douglas (1860–1949), American artist from Rhode Island
- Sir Arthur Douglas, 5th Baronet (1845–1913), Under-Secretary for Defence, New Zealand, of the Douglas baronets
- Drax the Destroyer, also known as Arthur Douglas, a Marvel Comics character
