= Kevin Zucker =

Kevin Zucker may refer to:

- Kevin Zucker (artist)
- Kevin Zucker (game designer)
