= RISD =

RISD may refer to:

- Rhode Island School of Design
  - Rhode Island School of Design Museum, or the "RISD Museum"
  - List of presidents of the Rhode Island School of Design
  - List of Rhode Island School of Design people
- Rhode Island School for the Deaf
- Richardson Independent School District
