= Mignanelli =

Mignanelli is a surname. Notable people with the surname include:

- Bertrando de Mignanelli ((1370–1455 or 1460), Italian merchant
- Daniele Mignanelli (born 1993), Italian footballer
- Fabio Mignanelli (d. 1557), Italian Roman Catholic bishop
- Giacomo Mignanelli (d. 1576), Italian Roman Catholic prelate
- Matt Mignanelli (born 1983), American artist
