= Michael H. Riley filmography =

This page is the filmography for designer Michael H. Riley. He has worked on title design for television series and feature films.

== Television ==
Year	Title	Notes
1995	Saturday Night Live	TV series
1996	Swift Justice	TV series
1997	George Wallace	TV movie
1997	Sleepwalkers	TV series
1998	L.A. Doctors	TV series
2000	American Experience	TV series documentary
2000	The $treet	TV series
2001	Band of Brothers	TV mini-series, Emmy Award nomination: Outstanding Main Title Design
2003	Karen Sisco	TV series
2005	Jake in Progress	TV series
2005	Criminal Minds	TV series
2006	Blade: The Series	TV series
2006	Standoff	TV series, Emmy nomination: Outstanding Main Title Design
2007	The Winner	TV series
2007	Army Wives	TV series
2007	Side Order of Life	TV series
2008	Terminator: The Sarah Connor Chronicles	TV series
2008	Miss Guided	TV series
2008	Family Foreman	TV series
2009	Taking Chance	TV movie, Emmy nomination: Outstanding Main Title Design
2009	Grey Gardens	TV movie
2009	Hawthorne	TV series
2009	Modern Family	TV series
2009	FlashForward	TV series
2009	Hank	TV series
2010	The Deep End	TV series
2010	Temple Grandin	TV movie, Emmy nomination: Outstanding Main Title Design
2010	The Defenders	TV series
2010	Raising Hope	TV series
2011	Criminal Minds: Suspect Behavior	TV series
2011	Too Big to Fail	TV movie, Emmy nomination: Outstanding Main Title Design
2011	Terra Nova	TV series
2011	The Secret Circle	TV series
2012	How to Be a Gentleman	TV series
2012	The Newsroom	TV series, Emmy nomination: Outstanding Main Title Design
2012	Go On	TV series
2013	Wendell & Vinnie	TV series
2013	Mary and Martha	TV movie
2013	The Goldbergs	TV series
2013	The Millers	TV series
2014	Turn: Washington's Spies	TV series
2014	NCIS: New Orleans	TV series
2015	Fresh Off the Boat	TV series
2015	The Player	TV series
2015	The Grinder	TV series
2016	Outsiders	TV series
2016	School of Rock	TV series

== Film ==
Year	Title	Notes
1992	Newsies	
1992	Passion Fish	Uncredited
1992	Passenger 57	Uncredited
1995	Nixon	
1997	Volcano	Teaser
1997	Men with Guns	Uncredited
1997	Gattaca	D&AD Black Pencil Award: Main title design
1997	MouseHunt	
1998	The Mask of Zorro	Uncredited
1999	Limbo	Uncredited
1999	Anna and the King	
2000	Unbreakable	Teaser - Uncredited
2000	Proof of Life	
2001	Along Came a Spider	Co-Designer, Main Title - Uncredited
2002	Spider-Man	Teaser
2002	Signs	Teaser
2002	S1m0ne	
2004	I, Robot	Teaser
2005	Rent	
2007	The Invisible	
2008	Mad Money	
2008	Kung Fu Panda	
2008	Traitor	
2008	Madagascar: Escape 2 Africa	
2009	12 Rounds	
2009	A Dog Year	Uncredited
2009	Road, Movie	
2010	How to Train Your Dragon	Special Sequence Designer
2010	The Back-up Plan	
2011	Kung Fu Panda 2	
2011	Footloose	
2011	Book of Dragons	Video short - motion graphics
2012	The Vow	
2012	Pitch Perfect	Uncredited
2013	21 & Over	Uncredited
2013	The Host	Uncredited
2013	The To Do List	
2013	Saving Mr. Banks	Uncredited
2016	Dirty Grandpa	
2016	The Magnificent Seven	
