= Betty Miller =

Betty Miller may refer to:

- Betty Miller (author) (1910–1965), Jewish author
- Betty Miller (pilot) (1926–2018), first female pilot to fly solo across the Pacific Ocean, 1963
- Betty G. Miller (1934–2012), American artist

== See also ==
- Elizabeth Miller (disambiguation)
