= Glenn Gissler =

American interior designer (born 1957)

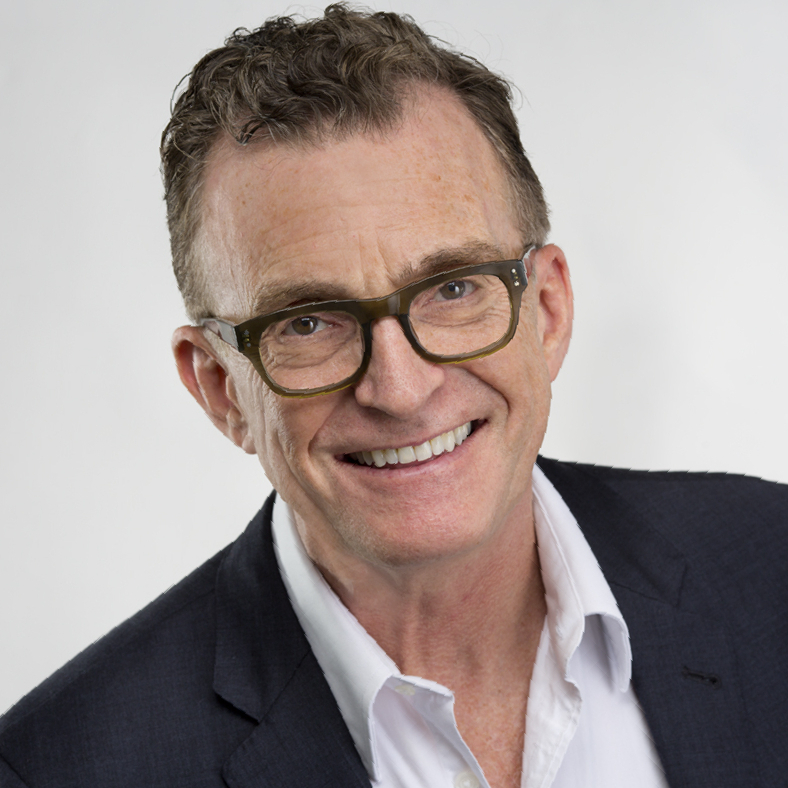
- Born: Lake Forest, Illinois, US
- Education: Boston Architectural College, Rhode Island School of Design
- Occupations: Interior designer, architect, art advisor
- Website: gissler.com

Glenn Gissler (born 1957) is an American interior designer, based in New York City. He is the owner of Glenn Gissler Design, Inc.

Gissler is known for his residential design work with such clients as fashion designer Michael Kors and comedy club impresario Caroline Hirsch. He has also consulted on residential projects for fashion designer Calvin Klein, hotelier Ian Schrager and other leaders in the financial and entertainment worlds.

In naming him one of New York's Top 50 Designers, New York Spaces wrote: "Gissler's interior design practice is a culmination of a lifelong interest in 20th-century art, literature, fashion, historic preservation, and architectural history. These interests are manifest in work that is stylistically diverse, but beautifully crafted and integrated into the architecture of the space."

== Early life ==
Gissler was born on September 13, 1957, in Lake Forest, Illinois, and raised in Milwaukee, Wisconsin. His father, Sig Gissler, a former editor of the Milwaukee Journal, is a retired adjunct professor of journalism at Columbia University and the former administrator of the Pulitzer Prize, and his mother, Mary Gissler, is a retired nurse. Gissler first showed interest in the world of art and design as a 9-year-old when he began enrolling in a variety of painting courses. He specialized in nudes and the human form.

=== Education ===
In 1976, Gissler started formal training in interior design as an undergraduate at the University of Wisconsin–Madison. At the same time, he was an active member of the Board of the Madison Trust for Historic Preservation. Gissler transferred to the Boston Architecture Center (now known as Boston Architectural College) for two years before attending the Rhode Island School of Design from 1980 to 1984. He graduated with degrees in both Fine Arts and Architecture. He appears on notable alumni lists for the University of Wisconsin–Madison arts and entertainment department and the Rhode Island School of Design architecture department.

== Career ==
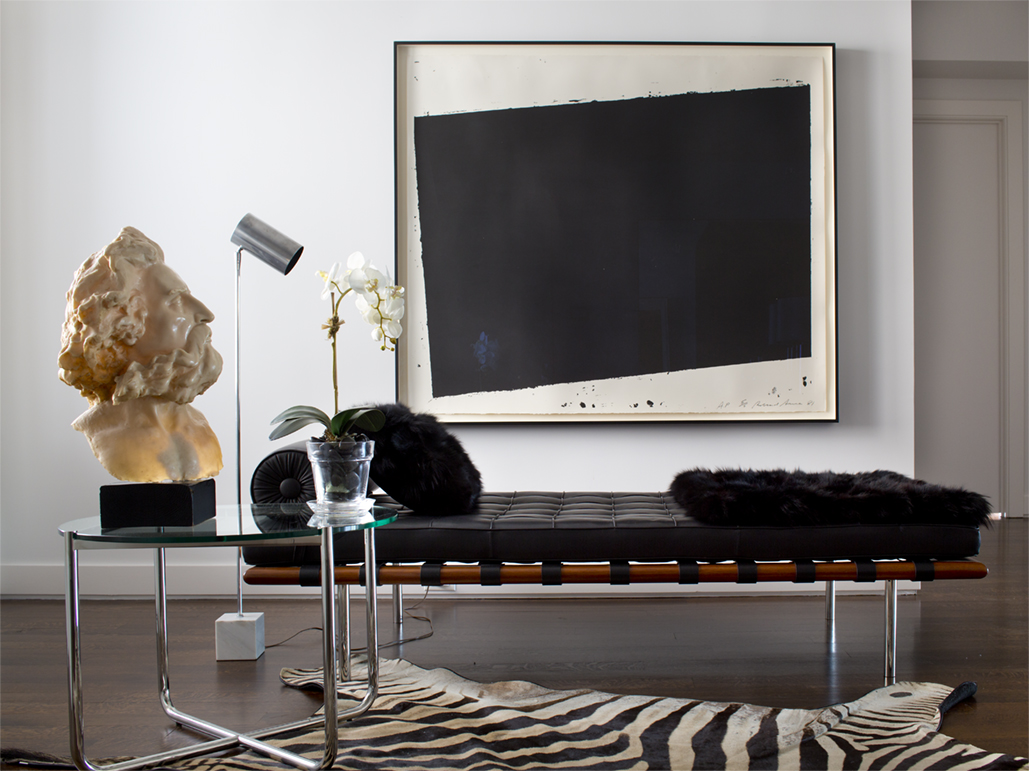
The Greenwich Village penthouse of Michael Kors, designed by Gissler.

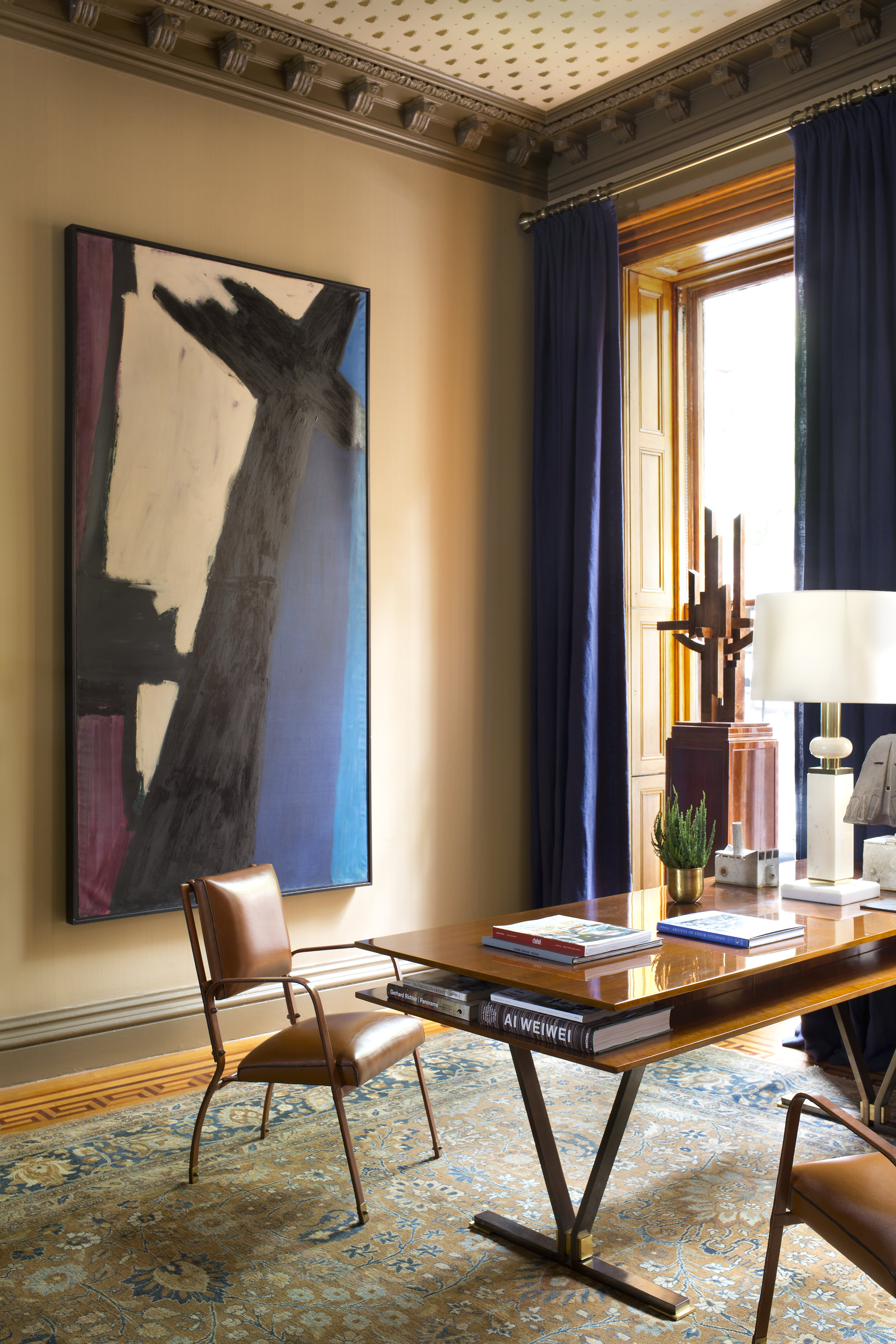
Gissler's Brooklyn Heights designer showhouse

Gissler began his professional career in the New York offices of interior designer Juan Montoya. He later worked as an interior designer for acclaimed architect Rafael Vinoly, generally focusing on office and high-end residential projects. He established Glenn Gissler Design, Inc. in 1987.

Gissler's approach to interior design borrows heavily from his training in architecture, as well as his interest in 20th-century art, fashion, literature, sociology, and in objects as cultural artifacts. He unites architectural concepts with artfully considered applications of furnishings, fabrics, and lighting, ultimately creating environments built around his clients’ personalities. Gissler’s notable clients include prominent members of the fashion, design, business, financial, law, and entertainment industries.

Gissler has served as an art advisor for many of his clients. He has placed works by Joan Mitchell, Larry Poons, Louise Bourgeois, Nancy Spero, Cy Twombly, Pablo Picasso, Brice Marden, Jacob Hashimoto, Donald Judd, Richard Tuttle, and many others.

From 2006 to 2016, Gissler sat on the Board of Governors of the Rhode Island School of Design Museum, and has taken a strong lead in building the institution’s collection of 20th century design through donations of objects by influential designers including Ettore Sottsass, Russel Wright, Aldo Rossi, Christopher Dresser, and Raymond Loewy and artists including Donald Baechler, Joan Mitchell, and Donald Judd. Gissler has also been a visiting critic at the Rhode Island School of Design, the Fashion Institute of Technology, and the Parsons School of Design.

From 1995 to 2015, Gissler was a member of Designers Collaborative, a New York-based network of leading interior design professionals and architects who meet regularly to discuss ideas, news, and trends affecting their industry.

Widely published, Gissler's work has appeared in the New York Times, InStyle, Elle Decor, Town & Country, House Beautiful, House & Garden, Luxe, Robb Report, Remodelista, and Architecturaldigest.com. He has also contributed to the book Interior Design Master Class, by Carl Dellatore.

In 2017, Gissler was one of 17 interior designers invited to outfit the Brooklyn Heights Designer Show House, a historic townhouse in Brooklyn Heights. He designed the living room of the residence using 20th-century furniture and art.

=== American Society of Interior Designers ===
In 1985, Gissler joined the American Society of Interior Designers (ASID), the United States' oldest and largest professional association for interior designers. He served as President of the ASID New York Metro Chapter from 2016 to 2017. During his tenure, he partnered with the International Contemporary Furniture Fair (ICFF) to produce ASID NY-sponsored events during the four day show. In addition, he revamped DESIGN, the chapter's quarterly magazine, and arranged for ASPIRE One Communications, Inc. to publish it. Gissler also succeeded in recruiting many industry leaders as new members of ASID.

== Awards and honors ==
- 1995: House Beautiful - Ten Best Show House Rooms in America
- 1999: Design Times - 10 Designers to Watch
- 2002: New York - 100 Best Architects & Decorators
- 2003: ASID New York Metro Chapter Interior Design Project Competition - First Place
- 2007: New York Home - 50 Names You Should Know in New York Design
- 2013: New York Cottages & Gardens - Innovation in Design Award for Interior Design
- 2014: New York Cottages & Gardens - Innovation in Design Awards for Gardens
- 2014: ASID-NY Metro Chapter Inspired Designer Award
- 2015: New York Cottages & Gardens - Innovation in Design Award for Interior and Kitchen Design
- 2016: New York Spaces - Top 50 Designers
- 2018: LUXE Gold List
