= ANIMUS (graphic novel) =

French graphic novel

- Paperback Cover
- Date: 8 May 2018
- Page count: 224 pages
- Publisher: First Second Books

Creative team
- Writer: Antoine Revoy
- Artist: Antoine Revoy
- ISBN: 1626721831

ANIMUS is a graphic novel written and illustrated by French cartoonist Antoine Revoy. Part ghost story, part detective-fiction, it was published by First Second Books on 8 May 2018.

== Story ==
The novel is set in a quiet neighborhood in Kyoto, Japan where, unbeknownst to the general public, children are mysteriously disappearing.

Two elementary school friends, Sayuri and Hisao, slowly come to realize that inauspicious, paranormal forces are at play in the most unlikely of places: the local playground. This playground is haunted by a trapped, snaggled-tooth ghost named Toothless, whose body was buried and never recovered. As Toothless reveals the playground's secrets, Sayuri and Hisao slowly come to realize that the tragic events in their hometown are connected to its supernatural powers. When one of their friends gets hurt, they resolve to exorcise the playground's evil. They set out on a search for Toothless's missing body, in hopes of releasing his spirit.

== Themes and motifs ==
Inspired by Revoy's childhood in Japan, ANIMUS muses upon themes of fear, captivity, animism, and the old and the new.

Revoy stated in a podcast interview that ANIMUS is designed as a puzzle.

== Reception ==
ANIMUS has received high praise for the quality of its black and white artwork, originality and thematic depth. However, some critics found the plot convoluted and its signature twist perplexing. Paste Magazine highlighted ANIMUS as "[...] a must-read for anyone invested in the next generation of horror hounds" while Kirkus Reviews deemed it "an eerie graphic novel mystery that is bewildering and unnerving in the best way possible". ANIMUS was distinguished as one of the 20 Best Kids Comics of 2018 and one of the 31 Best Scary Comics For Kids by Paste Magazine. The following year, it was selected by YALSA, a division of the American Library Association, as one of the 2019 Great Graphic Novels for Teens.
