= Union Dime Savings Bank =

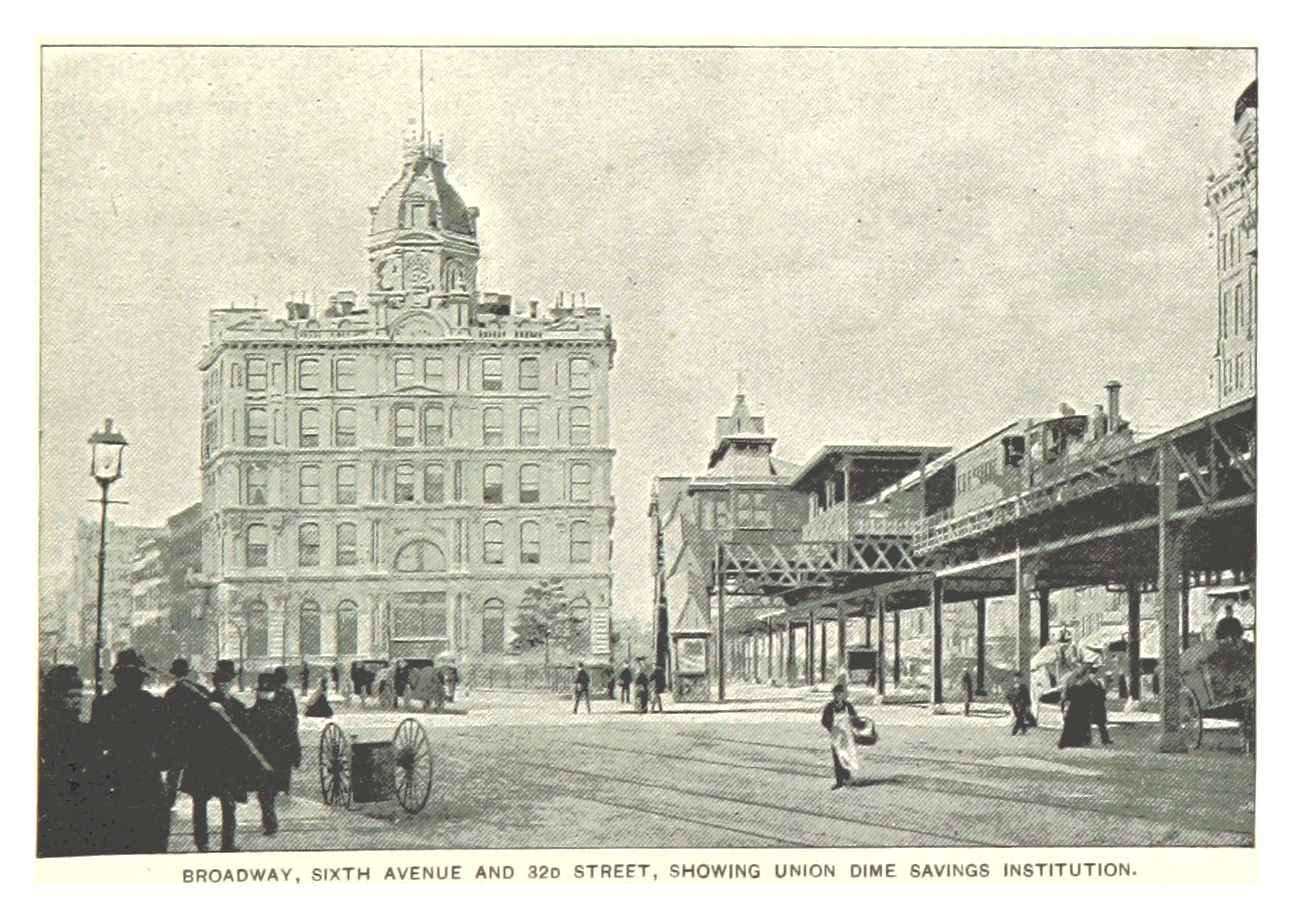
32nd Street, 1893

Union Dime Savings Bank was originally chartered in 1859 in New York City, US. By the time of bank deregulation in 1979 it was starting to suffer losses. With the direction of the Federal Deposit Insurance Corporation, it was acquired by Buffalo Savings Bank and, along with the New York Bank for Savings, became part of the renamed Goldome. In 1990, Manufacturers Hanover Trust bought $2.8 billion in deposits in 24 New York City branches for $27.7 million. By late 1991, Goldome failed and its New York assets were sold to Manufacturers Hanover Trust and the East New York Savings Bank.

An exhibition by Siri Berg based on Arthur Schnitzler's Reigen or La Ronde became a permanent installation of Union Dime Savings Bank.

== See also ==
- 1065 Avenue of the Americas – office building built for bank
