= Siri Berg =

American abstract artist (1921–2020)

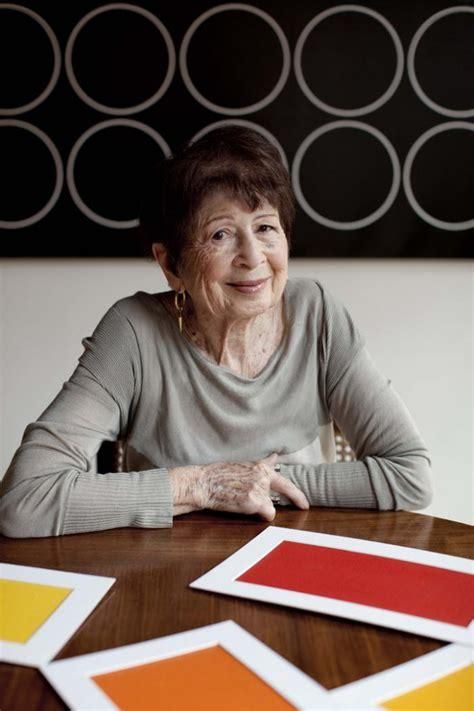
- Born: Siri Schlossman; September 14, 1921; Stockholm, Sweden
- Died: April 8, 2020 (aged 98); New York City, U.S.
- Occupations: Artist, teacher
- Website: www.siriberg.com

Siri Berg (September 14, 1921 – April 8, 2020) was a Swedish-born American abstract artist and teacher. Berg's work is included in the permanent collection of the Guggenheim Museum in New York, as well as the National Museum of American Jewish History.

== Early life ==
Berg was born Siri Schlossman in September 1921 in Stockholm, Sweden, the daughter of Henia (Gassler) and Arthur Schlossman, who both worked in business. Her father was from Germany and her mother from Poland. She earned her bachelor's degree in art and architecture in Brussels. At age 19 in 1940, she traveled to New York City on her own. The trip took 28 days on a freighter with eight passengers. Her aunt met her in New York City at Columbus Circle, and her parents made the voyage six months later.

== Career ==
In New York, she worked in fashion and store window design for Franklin Simon & Co. as well as private clients before transitioning to focus on art in the early 1970s. Berg lived in Riverdale in New York City when she started painting in 1961. She created the series "Cycle of Life" in 1967 tracing the life cycle from the embryo through youth, maturity, and old age. In 1979, she gave a lecture at Brandeis University National Women's Committee Riverdale Chapter's annual Study Group party which focused on the 10 year development of her art. She transitioned from a studio in her home in Riverdale to a studio in the Soho Arts district in 1981.

Berg taught color theory at Parsons School of Design for over 25 years. Berg was a member of the American Abstract Artists group (AAA).

=== Exhibitions ===
Her first solo exhibition was in 1970 at the East Hampton Gallery in New York City. That exhibition featured work based on Arthur Schnitzler's Reigen or La Ronde which became a permanent installation at Union Dime Savings Bank.

Berg presented "The Black Series and The Four Elements - Selections" in 1979 at the New School Associates Gallery in New York. It was her seventh solo show of paintings in New York City. Berg was part of a three-person show, "Unknown Universes", at Pace University in 1979. Her work was exhibited at the American Swedish Historical Museum in Philadelphia in 1980.

In 1980, the exhibition "Siri Berg: Aspects of the Circle; Paintings of the Seventies" was presented at Ward-Nasse Gallery in Soho, New York. The exhibit presented a ten-year survey of the artists' work to that point, including works from her "La Ronde Series", "Phases Series", "Black Series", "White Series", "White Series" and the "Four Elements Series".

In 1984, Berg's exhibit "The Geometric Angle in Sculpture" was presented at Martin/Molinary Art and Design. The exhibit featured her transition into working with found objects. The exhibition also featured painting Berg created in the 70s including her "Black Series" and "Four Elements" which would later be included in the Guggenheim Museum's permanent collection. The exhibition debuted Berg's "White Holes" and "Black Holes" which use painted and unpainted suction cups in various ways mounted on Masonite and displayed in clear Plexiglas boxes Berg called "Environmental Boxes". "The Big Bang" was also included in the exhibit which portrayed a mushroom cloud as a thick white circle made of painted flexible pipe.

Berg held an exhibit at QCC Art Gallery at the Queensborough Community College in 1990. The exhibit included two series of black and white works, "The Four Elements" and "Empty Spaces". In 1994, she participated in a group of 35 artists who illustrated the biblical poem "Aishet Hayil: Woman of Valor" from the Book of Proverbs. The collection was exhibited at Yeshiva University Museum in New York. At that time, Berg began working with Stockholm's Galerie Konstruktiv Tendens.

In 2011, Berg debuted her series It's All About Color at The Painting Center in New York.

In 2012, her work was presented by Hionas Gallery in the exhibit "Black and White 1976 - 1981: Redux 2012" held in New York, New York which highlighted her early black and white works as opposed to her typical use of bold color. In the same year, Berg's work was featured in the group show "American Abstract Artists International" held at the Museum of the Aragonese Castle in Otranto, Italy. Her exhibit presented by Hionas Gallery in 2013 was titled "Phases". In 2015, Berg's exhibit "Siri Berg: Color and Space" opened at Hionas Gallery.

== Technique ==
Berg's work consists of assemblages (art created from found objects), paintings and collages. Her works tend to be minimalist through the use of geometric abstraction or color. Her main influence is the Bauhaus due to their "revolutionary and unconventional approach". Her art has been described as "cerebral and calculated" and "a paradox - exuberance born of control".

== Personal life ==
She married twice and had two sons, Jeffrey and Arthur.

Berg died in April 2020 at the age of 98.
