= Emiko Davies =

Australian food author and journalist

- Born: Canberra, Australia
- Education: Rhode Island School of Design
- Occupations: cookery book author, food journalist, food blogger

Emiko Davies is an Australia-born cookery book author, food journalist and food blogger, known for a focus on regional Italian food. She is based in Florence, Italy.

== Life and career ==
Emiko Davies is from Canberra, Australia and raised between Australia and China. She is of Japanese-Australian ethnicity. Davies attended Rhode Island School of Design (RISD) in Providence, Rhode Island and graduated with a B.F.A. degree in Printmaking in 2002. She was inspired to cook by the book, Science in the Kitchen and the Art of Eating Well (La Scienza in Cucina E L'arte Di Mangiar Bene, 1891) by Pellegrino Artusi and through experiencing the food of Florence.

She has written about food for The Canberra Times, The Guardian, Newsweek, Condé Nast Traveller, Gourmet Traveller, Food52, amongst others. She had a weekly column on Regional Italian Food on Food52.

== Publications ==
=== Books ===
- Davies, Emiko (2016). Florentine: The True Cuisine of Florence. Melbourne, Australia: Hardie Grant Publishing. ISBN 9781743584071.
- Davies, Emiko (2017). Acquacotta: Recipes and Stories from Tuscany's Secret Silver Coast. Melbourne, Australia: Hardie Grant Publishing. ISBN 9781743792117.
- Davies, Emiko (2019). Tortellini at Midnight: And other heirloom family recipes from Taranto to Turin to Tuscany. Melbourne, Australia: Hardie Grant Publishing. ISBN 9781743586068.
- Davies, Emiko (2023). Gohan: Everyday Japanese Cooking. Melbourne, Australia: Smith Street Books. ISBN 9781922754523.

=== Articles ===
- Davies, Emiko (8 May 2019). "Tortellini at Midnight: An Insider's Guide to Florence, How to Discover the Essence of the Tuscan Capital". Newsweek.
- Davies, Emiko (8 March 2016). "From Canberra to Italy - the making of Emiko Davies' Florentine cookbook". GoodFood Australia.
