= Elliott Hundley =

American artist (born 1975)

Elliott Hundley (born 1975 in Greensboro, North Carolina) is an American artist, living and working in Los Angeles.

Hundley earned an MFA in the Department of Painting and Drawing at the University of California, Los Angeles in 2005, with a 1997 BFA in printmaking from the Rhode Island School of Design. He also attended the Skowhegan School of Painting and Sculpture in 2002, and had fellowships from the Fine Arts Work Center in Provincetown, Massachusetts, the Vermont Studio Center, and Bemis Center for Contemporary Art in Omaha, Nebraska.

Hundley's work has been exhibited at Daniel Reich Gallery, New York, the Andrea Rosen Gallery, New York and various venues in Los Angeles, including group exhibitions at Peres Projects. Hundley has been part of the LAXed exhibition at the Peres Projects Berlin in April 2006 and the Hammer Museum in May 2006. His work is in the permanent collection of the Museum of Contemporary Art, Los Angeles, the Judith Rothschild Foundation Collection at the Museum of Modern Art, New York, and the Guggenheim Museum, New York.

"Hundley's compositions are delicately balanced and formally elaborate. The ghosts of Robert Rauschenberg's combines permeate these constructions. Color shifts between flamboyant and subtle, from intensely saturated to whispered tonalities...Textures may vary between tender and silken to prickly and menacing. Gravity is defied and exposed...In Hundley's assemblages, time—ancient and contemporary—spills forward and backward, one condition fusing into the other. A state of grace, before the fall, remains an echo, a still palpable presence, against the cacophony of history."
