= Odette England =

Australian-British photographer

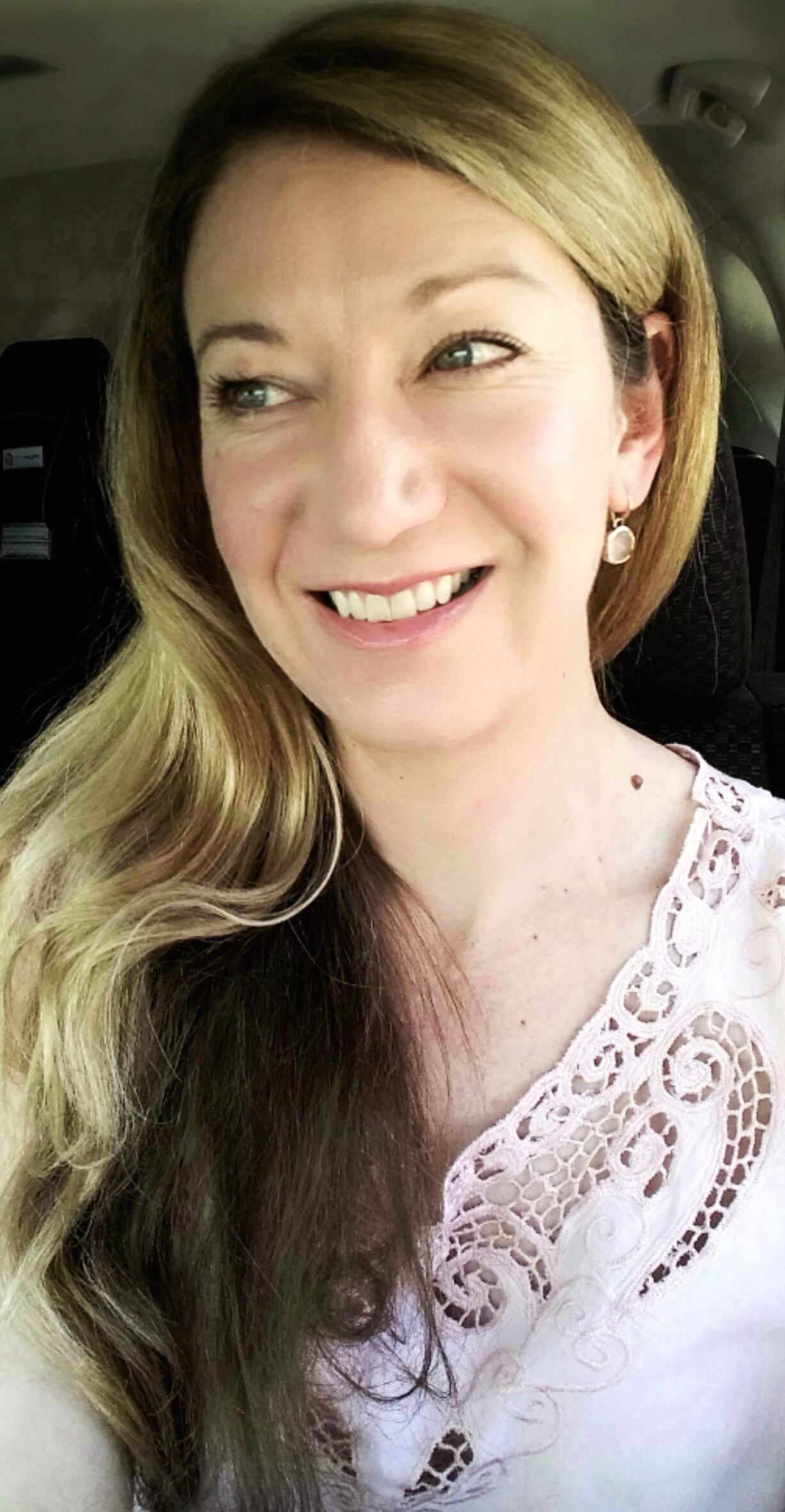
- Born: 15 January 1975 (age 51); Murray Bridge, South Australia
- Education: Rhode Island School of Design (MFA 2012), Australian National University (PhD 2018)
- Occupation: Photographer
- Website: odetteengland.com

Odette England (born 1975) is an Australian-British photographer whose artwork has been exhibited internationally. She often uses family photographs in her practice.

England's work is held in the collections of the Museum of Contemporary Photography, the New Mexico Museum of Art and the George Eastman Museum, where she exhibited in Of Time and Buildings with John Divola and Lori Nix.

In 2012, England won the CENTER $5,000 Project Launch Award. Of England's work, the juror, Virginia Heckert, Curator and Department Head of Photographs at The J. Paul Getty Museum wrote, "I kept returning to Odette England's Thrice Upon a Time for the story it tells about the loss of a family farm, and Ms. England's poignant effort to reclaim that loss by engaging her parents in the performative act of attaching negatives of the farm that she had taken previously to the soles of their shoes as they return to the site on a regular basis and walk the land that they once owned. The images derived from the battered and frayed negatives make tangible the anguish and grief the photographer wishes to convey".

In 2015, she was a finalist for the Australian Photo Book of the Year Award for her monograph Lover of Home. The book included images from Thrice Upon A Time. In speaking about the work in an exhibition as part of the South Australian Living Artist (SALA) Festival of 2015, Flinders University Art Museum and City Gallery (FUAM) director Fiona Salmon said that revisiting the property for the project brought mixed responses from England's parents: "She said that her mother was quite open and up for it, whereas her dad was quite upset by the process and found it very difficult to talk about the pictures".

England is an assistant professor and artist-in-residence at Amherst College. She is the director/curator of the Winter Garden Photograph project. The Winter Garden photograph project was created in 2020 for the 40th anniversary of Roland Barthes' book Camera Lucida. The project comprises two parts. The first is a 344-page edited volume of photographs and texts titled Keeper of the Hearth: Picturing Roland Barthes’ "Unseen Photograph," and the second was an exhibition of the works at the Houston Center for Photography held in 2020.

For the project, England invited more than 200 photography-based artists, writers, critics, curators, and historians from around the world to contribute an image or text that reflects on Barthes’ unpublished snapshot of his mother. Essayists include Douglas Nickel; Andrea V. Rosenthal, Professor of History of Art and Architecture, Brown University; Lucy Gallun, Associate Curator, Department of Photography, the Museum of Modern Art; and Phillip Prodger, Senior Research Scholar, Yale Center for British Art. The book also features a foreword by Charlotte Cotton, an independent curator and writer. Keeper of the Hearth is England’s first edited volume and was published by Schilt Publishing.

Her first photographic monograph Past Paper // Present Marks: Responding to Rauschenberg was published by Radius Books in 2021. She developed the project with fellow artist Jennifer Garza-Cuen. The book comprises photograms made in Robert Rauschenberg's swimming pool in Captiva, Florida, and it features essays by Dr. Susan Bright, David Campany, and Nicholas Muellner.

England's monograph Dairy Character, also published in 2021, received the Light Work Book Award in 2021 and was shortlisted for the Australian Photobook Award in 2022. The monograph, which was published by Saint Lucy Press, combines England's recent photographs with family snapshots, autobiographical short stories and vintage photographs to create a loose narrative that reflects her life growing up on a rural farm in southern Australia. The book also considers gender roles and the gender-based repression of women and girls in rural farming communities.

In 2022, England received a fellowship in photography from the John Simon Guggenheim Memorial Foundation. England published The Long Shadow: Unwrapped – Marion Post Wolcott's Labor and Love in 2024 a reexamination of the career of Marion Post Wolcott.
