= Matt Mignanelli =

American artist (born 1983)

- Born: 1983 (age 42–43); Providence, Rhode Island, U.S.
- Education: Rhode Island School of Design
- Known for: Painting Large-Scale

Matt Mignanelli (born 1983) is an American artist best known for his large-scale abstract paintings. Mignanelli lives and works in New York City.

== Early life and education ==
Mignanelli was born in Providence, Rhode Island in 1983. He graduated from the Rhode Island School of Design in 2005, earning a Bachelor of Fine Arts degree. After graduation, Mignanelli moved to Manhattan.

In 2011, he received a grant and was an artist-in-residence at the Vermont Studio Center in Johnson, VT.

== Work and critical reception ==
Mignanelli's paintings examine the relationship between structure and nature, incorporating graduating light and geometric forms to reflect urban and natural landscapes. His process involves freehand painting of geometric shapes, splashes of paint, and diluted washes layered over gestural underpaintings. He has stated that his use of enamel and the color blue references utilitarian applications in municipal and industrial settings, such as mailboxes and dumpsters.

In the 2018 monograph Blue Paintings, published by Denny Dimin Gallery, curator Aaron Levi Garvey analyzed Mignanelli's work, noting its focus on contrasts between structured daily life and moments of subconscious exploration.

Mignanelli's work has been reviewed in Interview magazine, ARTnews, Vice, Galerie Magazine, San Francisco Arts Quarterly (SFAQ), Whitewall Magazine, Robb Report, La Repubblica, San Francisco Examiner, GalleristNY, POST NEW, Complex, NY Arts Magazine, Dazed & Confused, and The Art Dossier.

He has lectured at Parsons School of Design and appeared in the 2013 season of VICE Magazine's Art Talk video series. In 2008, he worked alongside director Michel Gondry on Björk's music video "Declare Independence," in which he is shown painting.

== Exhibitions ==
Mignanelli's paintings have been exhibited extensively throughout the United States and internationally at locations including the SCAD Museum of Art, Goss-Michael Foundation, Denny Dimin Gallery, Hollis Taggart, 5 Bryant Park, Richard Heller Gallery, LUCE Gallery, Anonymous Gallery, Dubner Moderne, Kristin Hjellegjerde, Bleecker Street Arts Club, Artpark Warsaw, Guerrero Gallery, Spinello Projects, Art Copenhagen with Marianne Friis Gallery, and Recoat Gallery.

Mignanelli's selected solo and two-person exhibitions include:

- Between Nature & Structure at 5 Bryant Park (New York, 2020–21)
- Matt Mignanelli & Erin O'Keefe at Denny Dimin Gallery (Hong Kong, 2019)
- Nocturnes at Denny Dimin Gallery (New York, 2018)
- Power Dynamics at Dubner Moderne (Lausanne, 2018)
- Matt Mignanelli -- Johnny Abrahams, Two On Two at The Hole (New York, 2016)
- Grattan Street at LUCE Gallery (Torino, 2015)
- Matt Mignanelli - Russell Tyler, Between The Lines at Anonymous Gallery (Mexico City, 2015)
- Stories Unfold at Richard Heller Gallery (Los Angeles, 2014)
- Nonstop at Dubner Moderne (Lausanne, 2013)
- Matt Mignanelli - Ryan Wallace at Bleecker Street Arts Club (New York, 2013).

== Collections ==
His work can be found in private collections and also in the public collections of The Estée Lauder Collection, New York, The Morgan Stanley Collection, New York, The Ernesto Esposito Collection, Naples, and The Red Bull Collection, London.
