= Michael H. Riley =

- Born: Michael Harold Riley
- Education: Rhode Island School of Design
- Occupation: Designer

Michael Harold Riley (born November 1, 1968, in Palo Alto) is an American motion graphics designer, art director and the founder of design company Shine. Has directed the television title sequence for Turn: Washington's Spies, the film title sequence for Kung Fu Panda, film sequences for How To Train Your Dragon, and worked on the redesign of the animated MGM theatrical logo. He has been nominated for an Emmy Award six times including for the main title design on Temple Grandin.

== Early life and education ==
Riley grew up in Palo Alto, California. As a teenager, he ran a T-shirt silkscreen business called No-wear with a friend. In 1991, Riley earned a Bachelor of Fine Arts degree from Rhode Island School of Design. He had a design internship at M&Co. under Tibor Kalman. He has two sons named Luke and Jack.

== Career ==
In 1991, Riley joined R/GA in New York City. In 1996, he became a partner at design company Imaginary Forces in Hollywood.

Riley created the title design for Gattaca with Andrew Niccol. In 1998, the film won the D&AD Black Pencil Award for main title design. Riley was nominated for an Emmy Award, Outstanding Main Title Design, for Band Of Brothers in 2002.

In 2005, Riley founded design company Shine in his garage and serves as creative director. Riley's wife Laura came up with the name "Shine." Riley later recruited Bob Swensen as executive producer. The company moved to a studio on Los Angeles' Miracle Mile.

He received an Emmy nomination as creative director for Outstanding Main Title Design in 2007 for Standoff, 2009 for Taking Chance, 2010 for Temple Grandin, in 2011 for Too Big to Fail, and in 2013 for The Newsroom.

In 2020, Riley's studio Shine designed the end credits sequence for Birds of Prey. It received "Special Jury Recognition" and "Audience Award Winner" from SXSW. Also in 2020, Riley designed the title sequence of the HBO series Perry Mason. The 2021 Type Directors Club recognized the Perry Mason title sequence with the "Judge's Choice Award".

Riley is a member of the Directors Guild of America and the Television Academy. He was an adjunct faculty member at the Art Center College of Design in Pasadena, California.

== Partial filmography ==
- Saturday Night Live (1995)
- Gattaca (1997)
- Band of Brothers (2001)
- Kung Fu Panda (2008)
- Modern Family (2009)
- Taking Chance (2009)
- How to Train Your Dragon (2010)
- Temple Grandin (2010)
- Raising Hope (2010)
- Too Big to Fail (2011)
- Footloose (2011)
- The Newsroom (2012)
- Pitch Perfect (2012)
- Saving Mr. Banks (2013)
- The Millers (2013)
- The Goldbergs (2013)
- Fresh Off the Boat (2015)
- The Magnificent Seven (2016)
- La La Land (2016)
- Genius (2017)
- Young Sheldon (2017)
- S.W.A.T. (2017)
- Battle of The Sexes (2017)
- The Immortal Life of Henrietta Lacks (2017)
- Dickinson (2019)
- Birds of Prey (2020)
- Perry Mason (2020)
- The Harder They Fall (2021)
- Power Book III: Raising Kanan (2021)
- BMF (2021)
- The Mysterious Benedict Society (2021)

== See also ==
- List of Rhode Island School of Design people
