= Susan Thayer =

American ceramicist (born 1957)

Susan Thayer (born 17 October 1957 in New York, NY) is an American ceramicist known for her intricately painted porcelain teapots. Inspired by her grandmother's china as well as by historical European ceramics, she often combines traditional elements with other more contemporary designs in her work. In order to maintain a high level of detail, Thayer must often fire each individual piece between ten and twenty times. She currently lives and works in Portland, Oregon.

== Education and career ==
Thayer graduated from the Rhode Island School of Design in Providence, RI, in 1982 with a BFA in ceramics. After graduation, she remained in Providence and opened a porcelain production studio, though by 1986 she grew discouraged by "the limits imposed by the demands of production." This discontent led her to begin creating one-of-a-kind pieces, drawing on originality rather than the uniformity of mass production. These pieces are often inspired by traditions such as the ceremony and grandeur of a dinner table in all of its propriety: set with dishes on placemats and with multiple spoons, forks, and knives designated for different courses. In addition to serving as an image of tradition, the dinner table—like the teapot—also suggests the notion of people coming together in a ritualistic setting. In conjunction with this classic imagery, her distinctive teapots are also inspired by change, which she perceives as "both desirable and inevitable." That sense of change manifests itself in her teapots as slight alterations of the original form: the perfect spouts start to lengthen or warp, or surface designs are rendered in glow-in-the-dark paint.

== Work ==
Thayer's work is fluid in nature and intentionally "imperfect." She does not take on commissions, preferring to follow her own ideas.

Thayer's pieces are in the permanent collection of the Smithsonian American Art Museum, the De Young Museum, the Museum of Contemporary Craft, the Museum of Fine Arts Boston, The Racine Art Museum, and in the Newark Museum. Her work was shown in 2003 in "The Artful Teapot" at the George R. Gardiner Museum of Ceramic Art and the Long Beach Museum of Art, and in 1993, Feats of Clay V, at Gladding, McBean & Company in Lincoln, California.
