= Charles Tsunashima =

French-Japanese designer

Charles Tsunashima (綱島 崇シャルル, Tsunashima Takashi Charles, born in 1974 in Tokyo, Japan) is a French-Japanese designer of furniture, textiles, clothing and interiors. He is the founder of the company Gener8 Inc. ("Genereight").

== Early life ==
Tsunashima studied in secondary school at the St. Mary's International School in Tokyo, Japan. He received a Bachelor of Fine Arts in Industrial Design in 1997 and a Master of Fine Arts in Textiles in 2000 from the Rhode Island School of Design.

== Career ==
Tsunashima began his career as a designer for Issey Miyake and Knoll, Inc. In 2006, Tsunashima founded the craft and design company Genereight in Sumida, Tokyo, for which he serves as furniture maker (primarily in bamboo) and oversees all aspects of product design. He currently teaches the courses FUTURE CRAFT at the Tama Art University in Tokyo, in partnership with the ArtCenter College of Design in Pasadena, California. He is a co-instructor of the schools' Pacific Rim project, an international collaborative research effort culminating in public exhibits.
