= Peter Yeadon =

American architect

Peter Yeadon (born 1965) is an American architect and designer. He is a professor of Industrial Design at the Rhode Island School of Design, where he has taught since 2002.

== Early years and education ==
Yeadon was born in Truro, Nova Scotia, Canada. After studying engineering at Dalhousie University, he graduated with a Master of Architecture degree from Dalhousie University in 1989. Prior to teaching at Rhode Island School of Design, he was a faculty member at Cornell University and the University of Toronto.

== Career ==
Based in New York City, Yeadon is known for his research in advanced materials for architecture and industrial design. At the start of the 21st Century, he was an early proponent of adapting emerging material technologies to architecture, producing projects, essays, and lectures on the potential of biotechnology and nanotechnology. By 2005, Yeadon was recognized as a thought leader on nanotech in architecture, presenting “Year 2050: Cities in the Age of Nanotechnology” at the UIA XXII World Congress on Architecture in Istanbul, Turkey.

Throughout the mid-2000s, Yeadon expanded his focus on nanotechnology and biotechnology in architecture and design, shifting his interest toward programmable matter and nanorobotics (molecular machines, including DNA-based devices). His “nBots: Nanorobotic Environments” project was an early illustration of an architecture made of self-assembling nanomachines. During the same period, Yeadon also involved his RISD students in exploring design applications for nanomaterials and nanomachines.

By 2010, Yeadon was more fully focused on putting theory into practice. He had been experimenting with nanomaterials and smart materials, and he began using carbon nanotubes (CNTs) to create new substances for architecture and design, at a lab at MEx in Brooklyn. At the same time, he was also developing applications that make use of synthetic biology. Yeadon created buckypapers and electrically-conductive CNT coatings for artificial muscles in that lab, and was perhaps the first architect to experiment directly with carbon nanotubes, nanosheets, and nanoparticles. By the end of that pivotal year, he returned to writing, targeting “Four Approaches to Nanotechnology in Design Innovation.” That work evolved throughout the 2010s and into his practice today, Yeadon Space Agency, which pursues materials-driven innovation, and his teaching.

He serves on the Advisory Council of the Climate Museum.

== Honors and awards ==
- 1989 The Royal Architectural Institute of Canada Medal of Excellence.
- 1995 Canadian Architect Award of Excellence
- 1999 Ontario Association of Architects Unbuilt Projects
- 1999 The Prix de Rome (Canada) (Rome Prize) in Architecture for Professionals.
- 2003 AIA Boston Society of Architects Unbuilt Architecture Award
- 2008 PICNIC Green Challenge Finalist
- 2012 Tri-State Open Science Challenge Award
- 2016 LAGI Glasgow Award
- 2017 MacDowell Fellowship.
- 2018 The RISD John R. Frazier Award for Excellence in Teaching, "The award is presented each year at Commencement to one full-time and one part-time faculty member who embodies the highest ideals to which our faculty aspire, and who has had an enduring influence on student learning. All students, faculty, staff, alumni, and trustees are invited to take time to carefully consider a nomination for the Frazier Award for Excellence in Teaching."

== Collections ==
Peter Yeadon - Prix de Rome project records, Canadian Centre for Architecture.

Peter Yeadon - Kinetic Reconstructive System, Moholy-Nagy Foundation.
