= 1065 Avenue of the Americas =

Office skyscraper in Manhattan, New York

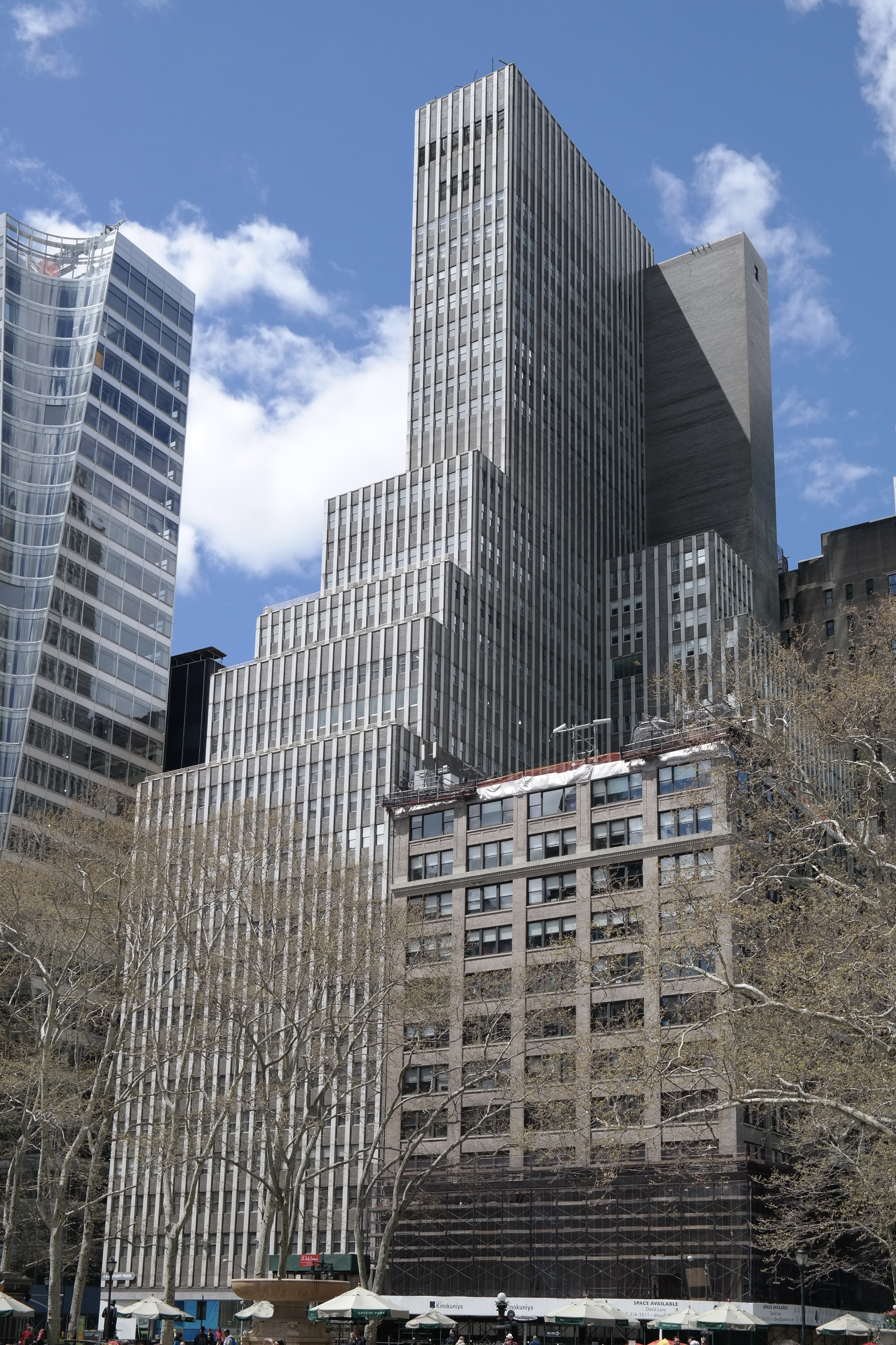
- View from Bryant Park
- Interactive map of the 1065 Avenue of the Americas area

General information
- Status: Completed
- Type: Office
- Architectural style: International style
- Location: 1065 Sixth Avenue, Manhattan, New York
- Coordinates: 40.75407°N 73.98540°W
- Construction started: 1955
- Completed: 1957
- Owner: Savanna

Height
- Roof: 451 ft (137 m)

Technical details
- Floor count: 38
- Floor area: 680,000 sq ft (63,000 m^{2})

Design and construction
- Architects: Sidney Goldstone and Kahn & Jacobs

1065 Avenue of the Americas (also known as 5 Bryant Park) is a 451-foot-tall (137 m) office building at 1065 Sixth Avenue between 40th and 41st Street in the Midtown Manhattan neighborhood of New York City. It was completed in 1957 and has 38 floors totaling approximately 680,000 square feet. Architectural firm Kahn & Jacobs designed the building in collaboration with Sidney Goldstone for the Union Dime Savings Bank. In 2007 the building underwent a $107 million renovation and in 2020 the entrance and lobby was refurbished.

== See also ==
- List of tallest buildings in New York City
