= Willem Van Lancker =

Co-founder and Chief Product Office of ebooks company Oyster

- Born: Providence, Rhode Island, US
- Education: Moses Brown School, Rhode Island School of Design
- Occupations: Head of Incubations at Thrive Capital, Former Co-founder & Chief Product Officer of Oyster
- Website: www.willemvanlancker.com

Willem Van Lancker is an American entrepreneur and product designer, who is best known for being the co-founder and Chief Product Officer of ebooks company Oyster. He is currently the Head of Incubations at Thrive Capital, a technology investment firm based in New York City.

== Biography ==
Willem Van Lancker was born in Providence, Rhode Island. He attended the private high school Moses Brown School, where he was named the 2016 Outstanding Young Alumnus. Van Lancker received a BFA degree in Graphic Design in 2011 from Rhode Island School of Design. He briefly attended Harvard Business School for graduate courses but did not complete his degree. It was at Harvard Business School where he met Eric Stromberg, one of the future co-founders of Oyster.

He began his career at Adidas in 2008 as an intern. Van Lancker later interned at Apple in 2009 where he helped create Apple's emoji. From 2010 until 2012, Van Lancker was a user experience designer for Google Maps where he worked on Google Maps for iOS and "The New Google Maps." Oyster was founded in 2012 by Van Lancker, Eric Stromberg and Andrew Brown. After Oyster was acquired by Google in 2015, Van Lancker and the rest of the staff moved to Google.

Van Lancker was named one of Forbes Magazine's 30 Under 30 in 2015.

On April 6, 2022, Rhode Island Governor Daniel McKee announced that Rhode Island's new license plate was designed by Van Lancker after the state held an open call for entries for a new design. The design features 5 waves.
