= Rachel Stern =

American photographer, professor

- Born: 1989 (age 36–37)
- Education: Rhode Island School of Design; Columbia University
- Occupations: Fine-art photographer, professor
- Website: www.msrachelstern.com

Rachel Stern (born 1989) is an American photographer and educator.

== Education ==
Stern studied at the Rhode Island School of Design, achieving a BFA in photography and art history in 2011. Stern attend and graduated from Columbia’s MFA Visual Arts program in 2016.

In 2014, Stern attended the Skowhegan School of Painting and Sculpture.

== Career ==
In 2019, Stern released Slow Morpheus, a monograph published by Matte Editions.

Stern's exhibitions often take inspiration from the literary canon, with her 2023 exhibition at the Camera Club of New York including text from Oscar Wilde’s Salome. Stern's 2016 exhibition Yes, Death also took inspiration from Oscar Wilde, with the title originating from an Oscar Wilde quote:“Yes, death. Death must be so beautiful. To lie in the soft brown earth, with the grasses waving above one’s head, and listen to silence. To have no yesterday, and no tomorrow. To forget time, to forget life, to be at peace.” Additionally, Stern has taken inspiration from Arthur Miller’s The Crucible and Voltaire’s Candide.

Stern's photographs have appeared in the New York Times.

=== Exhibitions ===
- Yes, Death - 2016 - Black & White Gallery/Project Space - Southampton, NY, USA
- More Weight - 2018 - Brandeis University Art Kniznick Gallery - Waltham, MA, USA
- Orpheus Looked - 2019 - MCCC James Kerney Campus Gallery - Trenton, NJ
- Ghost in The Machine - 2023 - Getty Images - Online
- One Should Not Look at Anything - 2023 - Camera Club of New York - New York, NY, USA

=== Teaching ===
Stern has taught both high school and college courses in photography. As of 2024, Stern is the Assistant Professor of Visual Arts, Photography at Union College in Schenectady, New York.
