= Matthias Pliessnig =

Matthias Pliessnig is an acclaimed furniture designer based in Providence, Rhode Island whose work uses steam bent wood. His style is "kinetically contemporary" and he uses "computer-aided curves with laborious craftsmanship" to handcraft chairs and benches.

Pliessnig is a graduate of Rhode Island School of Design and the University of Wisconsin (Madison). His interest in woodworking developed after he decided to build a boat and was inspired to apply those techniques, particularly steam bending of wood strips around a mold, to furniture making. The New York Times reported that his studio "looks more akin to a boat-builder’s garage than an icy SoHo loft, which makes sense when you consider the lunular shapes of Pliessnig’s chairs."

His first solo exhibition was hosted by Philadelphia's Wexler Gallery in 2008. Plessing's 2003 Shell is made of laminated mahogany wood strips around a concrete form. His work Bends is a bowed bench made from a grid of wood that "gives way to support the sitter".

In 2010, he was named a fellow by United States Artists.
