= Elizabeth Miller (epidemiologist) =

British epidemiologist

Elizabeth Miller OBE FMedSci is a British epidemiologist and professor at the London School of Hygiene and Tropical Medicine. She worked at the Public Health Laboratory Service and Public Health England, researching the safety and effectiveness of new and existing vaccination programmes. Prominent work included investigating the link between MMR vaccine and autism, finding no evidence to support a causal association between these.

== Career ==
Miller joined the Public Health Laboratory Service as a medical epidemiologist in 1978. Uptake of diphtheria-tetanus-pertussis vaccine had fallen in the United Kingdom, following a 1974 report that linked whole-cell pertussis vaccine to brain damage (see Pertussis vaccine § Controversy in the 1970s–1980s). Miller's first role with the Public Health Laboratory Service was working on large safety and efficacy studies of pertussis vaccines. Her work confirmed the safety of the vaccine and contributed to the subsequent increase in acceptance of the vaccine.

Her subsequent career investigated the safety and effectiveness of various vaccines, using methods including clinical trials, records linkage, and mathematical models. She investigated concerns of a potential link between the MMR vaccine and autism, finding no evidence of a causal association between these. She led research that showed multiple childhood vaccinations did not "overload the immune system" or cause an increase in secondary infections. She contributed to a change in policy that led to the use of meningitis C conjugate vaccines in Africa. She has led studies of the effect of vaccination against COVID-19 in the household setting.

She became the Head of the Immunisation Division at the Public Health Laboratory Service and remained in this role when the organisation became Public Health England. After leaving Public Health England, Miller became professor of vaccine epidemiology at the London School of Hygiene and Tropical Medicine and a visiting professor in the School of Public Health at Tel Aviv University.

Miller led the National Vaccine Evaluation Consortium for more than twenty years. She was a member of the World Health Organization (WHO) Strategic Advisory Group of Experts on Immunization from 2007 to 2013 and a founder member of the WHO Global Advisory Committee on Vaccine Safety.

== Honours ==
Miller was created an Officer of the Order of the British Empire in the 2004 New Year's Honours. She was elected a Fellow of the Academy of Medical Sciences in 2011.
