= Oyster (company) =

Commercial streaming service for digital e-books

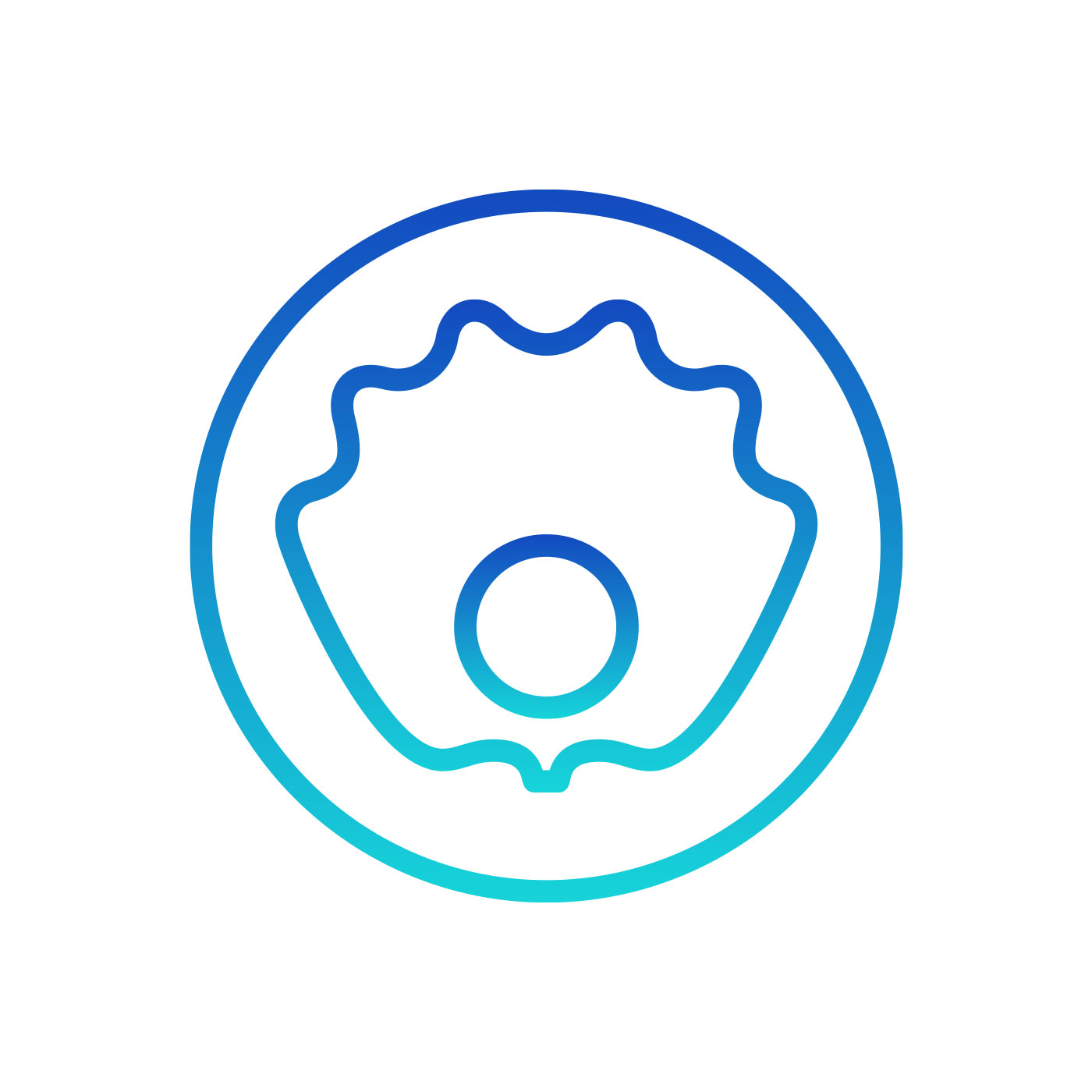
- Company type: Private
- Founded: 2012
- Dissolved: 2016
- Headquarters: New York City, New York, United States
- Owner: Alphabet Inc.
- Founders: Eric Stromberg, Andrew Brown, Willem Van Lancker
- Key people: Eric Stromberg, Andrew Brown, Willem Van Lancker
- Industry: Publishing, eBooks
- Website: www.oysterbook.com
- Users: 100,000 subscribers (September 2015)
- Launched: 6 September 2013

Oyster was a commercial streaming service for digital e-books, available for Android, iOS, Kindle Fire, and NOOK HD/HD+ devices. It was also available on any web browser on a desktop or laptop computer. Oyster held over 1 million books in its library, and as of September 2015, the service was only available in the United States.

In September 2015, Google acquired Oyster. No terms were disclosed but speculation put the price at somewhere between $20 million and $30 million. As a part of the acquisition it was reported that the founders would be leading Google Play Books in New York. In conjunction with the acquisition, Oyster shut down its existing service in early 2016.

== History ==
The company was founded in 2012 by Eric Stromberg, Andrew Brown, and Willem Van Lancker, and was headquartered in New York City.

In October 2012, Oyster received $3 million in seed funding led by Founders Fund. On January 14, 2014, Oyster announced a $14 million funding round, led by Highland Capital Partners.

Oyster launched on September 5, 2013, opening paid access, at $9.95 a month, via invitations available on a first-come, first-served basis. The service was the first subscription service to bring on a "Big Five" publisher in HarperCollins, with Mashable calling the service the "first true Netflix-for-E-books." Common early criticisms included limited content and lack of multi-platform support, but its reading experience and design were widely praised. Within ten days, users had read over a million pages.

On October 16, 2013, Oyster launched support for the iPad. The company also removed invitations as a requirement to join, and offered a 30-day free trial to all new users. Along with an iOS app redesign, the website additionally allowed for browsing of curated book lists.

In June 2014, the company expanded its services to Android and Kindle Fire devices, and in July 2014, the company launched a web reader application.

In November 2014, Oyster launched its online editorial magazine, The Oyster Review, and its Author Advisory Board. Oyster's Author Advisory Board was composed of authors Roxane Gay, Megan Abbott, and Lauren Oliver.

In April 2015, Oyster launched an ebook store, offering complete catalogues from all of the Big Five publishers for individual purchase, as a complement to its existing subscription service, Oyster Unlimited.

In September 2015, Oyster announced that it would sunset the existing Oyster service "over the next several months" and the company was to be acquired by Google. Google and Oyster did not comment but there was speculation that Google planned to enter the subscription market for ebooks. The company co-founders joined Google to work on the company’s Google Play Books.

== Features ==
Oyster offers several different reading modes, access to over 1 million titles, and book recommendations from its editorial staff. Users could also take advantage of highlighting and notes features and share their activities with friends using the platform. In June 2015, Oyster added a new feature, called Lumin, to help readers sleep better. The feature adjusts a reader's phone or tablet's light based on location and time of day, reducing the amount of blue light at night. Studies have shown that the blue light from smartphones and tablets can interfere with sleep.

== Content ==
Oyster offers over 1,000,000 titles from over 1,600 publishers. Of the Big Five publishers, HarperCollins, Simon & Schuster, and Macmillan Publishers had titles available through Oyster Unlimited, as well as a number of smaller presses including Perseus Book Group and Houghton Mifflin Harcourt. Smashwords, a self-publishing platform, also distributes to Oyster and appears to be the primary publisher of works available on Oyster Unlimited. All of the Big Five publishers offered books for purchase in Oyster's ebook store.

In January 2014, Oyster brought the entire Harry Potter series to the service through a partnership with J.K. Rowling and Pottermore. Oyster created a special user interface for reading the books as well as several exclusive interactive features to showcase the collection.

Carolyn Reidy, CEO of Simon & Schuster, told a panel at Digital Book World in 2014 that the publisher had not signed up over "unresolved questions about how to avoid devaluing books and cannibalizing sales." However, in May 2014, the publisher added their entire backlist at that point, consisting of about 14,000 titles, to the platform.

== The Oyster Review ==
In addition to the company's subscription service, Oyster also produces and edits a "literary magazine for the life well-read" called the Oyster Review. The magazine operates as a discovery vehicle for the subscription service's content and brings in author's for interviews and guest essays. Contributors include: Choire Sicha, Lauren Oliver, Megan Abbott, Longform, Of a Kind, San Fermin, Rainbow Rowell, Jeff Vandermeer, Teju Cole, and Judy Blume.

The launch of the Oyster Review led to some speculation that Oyster would be going the route of other subscription services like Netflix who create their own content. Oyster's Kevin Nguyen however was resistant to the notion: "We’ve seen other people try to do it themselves and underestimate how good publishers are at their job,” Mr. Nguyen said. “We’re interested in joining the literary conversation, not do what publishers do.”

== Data Collection ==
On Christmas Day 2013, The New York Times reported that Oyster and Scribd were among new ebook platforms which collected data on users' reading habits.

== Critical reception and design ==
Reviews of Oyster from tech outlets had been largely positive with the service garnering several awards and "best of" recognitions. Reports and reviews largely focus on the service's excellent user experience, design, and focus on mobile reading.

In 2013, Oyster was named TechCrunch's "Best iOS Apps of the Year." Wired had described the app's design as "gorgeous", and PandoDaily said the app "makes Amazon look old,". The New York Times called it the "prettiest of the ebook subscription services." Shortly after the launch of company's Android app, the service was awarded Google's "Beautiful Design Award."

In a review of the service, The New Yorker's Ian Crouch wrote that the app "takes its name from a line in 'The Merry Wives of Windsor' ('the world’s mine oyster,' spoken, incidentally, by a thief)." He also noted the app as being "handsomely designed."

== See also ==
- Kindle Unlimited
- Scribd
