= Antoine Revoy =

French author and illustrator

Antoine Revoy (born 1977, Paris, France) is a French author and illustrator. He is the creator of the horror story graphic novels ANIMUS (originally titled The Playground) published by First Second Books, and The Harrowing Game, (originally titled Ghost Notes), published by 23rd St. Books. Revoy is married to illustrator Kelly Murphy.

== Early life ==
Revoy was born in Paris, France and raised in Tokyo, Japan, following which his family moved to Mexico City, Mexico. As a sixteen-year-old, he was contacted by Japanese manga publisher Weekly Morning to create comics but opted to attend college instead. He graduated from the Rhode Island School of Design with a Bachelor of Fine Arts in Film/Animation/Video in 1999.

== Career ==
Revoy began his career as a designer in Dublin, Ireland and Paris, France. Following a move to the United States, he started working as an illustrator, creating artwork for the horror story chapter book Haunted Houses written by Robert D. San Souci. Revoy has created editorial illustrations for The New York Times and Der Spiegel, winning awards from the Society of Illustrators, American Illustration, PRINT Magazine, Spectrum and gold medals from the Society of Illustrators of Los Angeles and Graphis. He teaches at his alma mater, the Rhode Island School of Design (RISD), where he has been distinguished as a RISD Illustration ICON, and is a Master of Fine Arts thesis mentor at the School of Visual Arts in New York.
