= Matthew Leifheit =

American photographer, magazine editor, professor

- Born: 1988 (age 37–38); Marshfield, Wisconsin, U.S.
- Education: Rhode Island School of Design; Yale University
- Occupations: Fine-art photographer, magazine editor, professor
- Employer(s): Freelance photographer, Yale School of Art, MATTE Magazine
- Website: www.matthewleifheit.com

Matthew Leifheit (born 1988) is an American photographer, writer, magazine-editor, publisher, and professor. He is based in Brooklyn, New York.

== Early life and education ==
Leifheit was born in 1988 and raised in Marshfield, Wisconsin. As of 2022, only day (12) was publicly known of his exact birthdate. He attended the Rhode Island School of Design (RISD), graduating in 2011 with a Bachelor of Fine Arts degree in Photography. In 2015, Leifheit enrolled at Yale University graduating in 2017, receiving a Master of Fine Arts degree.

== Publishing ==
=== MATTE Magazine ===
In 2010, while at RISD, Leifheit founded MATTE Magazine, a magazine platform for new ideas in photography which he edits and publishes. MATTE Magazine often features a photographer's work, a portrait of the photographer by Leifheit, and an interview of the artist conducted by Leifheit.

=== Vice magazine ===
After graduating RISD, Leifheit was hired as photo-editor by Vice. While a photo-editor at Vice, Leifheit put a photograph by Robert Mapplethorpe on the cover of the 2014 fashion issue. In 2016, he wrote an article featuring the work of Neil Winokur, highlighting an "overlooked" photographer with work in many museum collections including Museum of Modern Art and the Metropolitan Museum of Art.

=== MATTE Editions ===
In 2018, MATTE Editions published a monograph by Matthew Morocco titled Complicit. In 2019, MATTE Editions published Slow Morpheus, a monograph by photographer Rachel Stern.

In addition to editing and publishing, Leifheit has also written on art and photography for Time and Aperture.

== Photographic practice ==
Leifheit's photography focuses on the human figure and their lived environment; his work features a variety of locations from Fire Island, Key West, the crowds surrounding New York City's Freedom Tower, Providence, and others. In addition to his fine art photography work, Leifheit works as an assignment photographer for a variety of publications including The New York Times and The New Yorker, photographing subjects such as Vince Aletti and Mary Boone.

=== Exhibitions ===
==== Selected solo exhibitions ====
- 2012 - Matte Magazine - Printed Matter, Inc, New York City, New York
- 2017 -Your Georgio, M.A.W. - 56 Henry St, New York City, New York
- 2018 - Fire Island Night - Deli Gallery, New York City, New York
- 2019 - Nothing More American - Florence Griswold Museum, Connecticut

==== Selected group exhibitions ====
- 2012 - :):):) - curated by Raphael Cohen and Bea Walling, RISD Museum, Providence, Rhode Island
- 2014 - AA Bronson and Michael Bühler-Rose Present ‘The Botanica,’ Invisible Exports, New York City, New York
- 2015 - FOAM Talents Exhibition 2015 - Paris Photo, Brussels, London
- 2017 - The Most Beautiful Part/La Parte Mas Bella, Museo de Arte Moderno, Mexico City
- 2018 - The Secret Gay Box, Tom of Finland Foundation, Los Angeles, California

== Awards and recognition ==
- Camera Club of New York Curatorial Fellowship, 2013
- Yale Fund for Lesbian and Gay Studies, 2016
- Beinecke Rare Book & Manuscript Library Fellowship, 2016
- Yale School of Art Richard Benson Prize, 2017
