= Alice Malhiot =

Canadian architect (1889–1968)

Alice Charlotte Malhiot (August 13, 1889 – June 10, 1968) is believed to be the first Canadian woman to graduate from an architectural school.

== Biography ==
The daughter of Zephirin Malhiot, a civil engineer, and Domiltide "Tilly" Hart, she was born in eastern Ontario. She received a diploma in architecture from the Rhode Island School of Design in 1910. Malhiot returned to Calgary, where she was employed by architecture firm Lang & Major until 1913. In 1911, she enrolled in the Department of Architecture at the University of Alberta. It was reported that she was the first woman to graduate from a Canadian architecture school in 1914, but it was later determined that she had graduated only in the field of sanitary science.

Following a decline in the economy, Malhiot was only able to find employment as a clerk and then stenographer. In 1917, she married Hugh Ross, a lumber dealer. She worked from her home in Duffield, Alberta, preparing designs for buildings for her husband's business. After her husband died in 1944, she worked for an Edmonton construction firm designing single family homes. Mahliot went on to complete post-graduated studies in interior design, landscape architecture and town planning at the Rhode Island School of Design.

She died in Edmonton at the age of 78.
