= Fred Lynch (illustrator) =

American illustrator and educator

Fred Lynch is an American illustrator and educator from Cumberland, Rhode Island. Lynch is best known for his editorial and book illustrations for The Atlantic, Penguin and Random House as well as in situ paintings of the Boston-area and Italy. He is also known for journalistic illustration, urban sketching, teaching, and lecturing internationally about on-site art making. Lynch was a featured artist on a Boston episode of the Travel Channel's television series Bizarre Foods with Andrew Zimmern, as an expert about the route of Paul Revere's Midnight Ride.

== Teaching ==
Lynch is an illustration professor at the Rhode Island School of Design (RISD), where he has won the John R. Frazier Award for Excellence in Teaching. Lynch graduated in Illustration from Rhode Island School of Design in 1986. He is also a professor and chair of the Illustration Department at Montserrat College of Art and a recipient of the Carlos Dorrien Award for Teaching Excellence.

Artist Shepard Fairey's first project to garner international attention, the "André the Giant Has a Posse" sticker campaign, which later evolved into the "Obey Giant" campaign, began in 1989 as an assignment in Lynch's class at the RISD.
