= Elizabeth Miller (geologist) =

American structural geologist

- Education: Rice University
- Scientific career
- Fields: structural geology, tectonics
- Workplaces: Stanford University
- Thesis: Geology of the Victorville Region, California (1977)
- Doctoral advisor: B. Clark Burchfiel

Elizabeth L. Miller is a structural geologist and emeritus professor at Stanford University. Her research focuses on the dynamics of tectonics and research of the crust and mantle, utilizing field mapping, petrography, and structural analysis. She is an expert on the tectonic evolution in the Arctic, ranging from Alaska and Canada to far east Russia.

She was elected a fellow of the Geological Society of America in 1985.

== Education and career ==
Elizabeth Miller grew up in Brazil, and later came to the United States for college.

She received a B.A. from Franklin & Marshall College in 1973. She completed a master's degree (1976) and a Ph.D. (1977) at Rice University. Her M.S. work examined the Numidian Formation and the Mogod Mountains in Tunisia. and her Ph.D. research examined the geology around Victorville, CA. As of 2024 she is an emeritus professor at Stanford University.

Miller was the first woman to lead the Stanford Geological Survey, from 1979-1995, with one break in 1986.

== Research ==
Miller’s research focuses on the geology of several regions - the North American Cordillera, Russia, the Arctic, and Alaska. She utilizes geologic mapping, petrography, and structural analysis in her research, applying an interdisciplinary approach to understanding the nuances of lithospheric-scale deformation of these plates and boundaries. An excerpt from the citation for her Career Contribution awards sums up her contributions well. Miller "combines her geologic mapping expertise with a stunning array of petrologic, stratigraphic, structural, metamorphic, igneous, geochemical, geochronological, thermochronological, and geophysical investigations, and set a standard for how multidisciplinary studies should be done." Her work over the years has provided crucial links between surface process, shallow crustal brittle process, mid-crustal ductile process, and metamorphism. She has also examined how the mountains of the Sierra Nevada range were formed.

== Selected publications ==
The Snake Range Décollement: An exhumed Mid-Tertiary ductile-brittle transition. This paper examines how the Snake Range in Nevada was formed and explores the possible geologic mechanisms that led to some of its more interesting geologic features. The results suggest that the Snake Range Decollement developed as a ductile-brittle transition zone at 6-7 km depth in the crust, and that similar extensional detachment faults can be developed locally between brittley extended rocks and underlying ductile extension and intrusion.

Baltica in the Cordillera?. U-Pb zircon dating from Paleozoic strata in several study sites in the Arctic suggests an origin from Gondwana or Baltica, providing a more definitive answer to the geochronological origin of Baltica affinity terranes in the Cordillera. This paper proposes a much simpler history of Cordillera than that proposed in Colpron and Nelson (2009).

New insights into Arctic paleogeography and tectonics from U-Pb detrital zircon geochronology. Zircon dating in the Arctic Ocean helped piece together when and how the basin was formed. Mapping techniques are used to identify stratigraphic units and fold belts. While a previous plate tectonic model shows a counterclockwise rotation of the Arctic Alaska-Chukotka microplate away from the Canadian Arctic margin, zircon data suggests that the Chukotka part of the microplate originated closer to the Taimyr and Verkhoyansk (east of the Polar Urals) and not from the Canadian Arctic.

Extensional origin of ductile fabrics in the Schist Belt, Central Brooks Range, Alaska—I. Geologic and structural studies. High strain foliations and dip-down stretching libations observed in the rock units suggests that the tectonites were deformed during mid-Cretaceous crustal extension, not during the Brooks Range orogeny, as was previously thought. Examines the myolinites and schist fabrics within this schist belt to disprove a previous theory suggesting they were formed through contractional deformation within the Brook Range orogeny.

== Honors and awards ==
Miller was elected to the fellowship of the Geological Society of America in 1985, an honor for geologists who have made significant contributions to their discipline.

In 2018 Miller earned the Career Contribution Award by the Structural Geology and Tectonics division of Geological Society of America. She was presented with this honor, for her research advances in understanding the tectonic process of the crust and mantle and her influence on students she has mentored over the years.

In 2021, Miller was awarded the Excellence in Teaching Award by the School of Earth, Energy and Environment at Stanford University.
