= Deborah Poynton =

South African painter (born 1970)

- Born: 1970 (age 54–55); Durban, South Africa
- Education: Rhode Island School of Design
- Known for: Painting realism

Deborah Poynton (born in 1970) is a South African painter best known for her monumental, hyper-realistic, hyper-detailed, nude portraits, usually of friends and family. She lives and works in Cape Town.

== Early life and education ==
Born in Durban, South Africa in 1970, her parents founded and ran an anti-apartheid conference centre and died when she was a child. Poynton grew up in South Africa, England, Swaziland and the United States, often moving to different boarding schools.

Poynton knew from the start that she wanted to be an artist. Before returning to South Africa to paint, she attended the Rhode Island School of Design for two years between 1987 and 1989, but did not graduate.

== Career ==
Poynton's paintings are more about the act of looking, of exposing the "trickery" behind traditional artistic practices, than they are windows onto a surreal world. By constructing spaces, placing slightly discordant objects amongst seemingly natural landscapes, Poynton creates a tension within her work that is intended to make the viewer uncomfortably aware of the act of perception. While most of her work can be categorized as realism, a few series depart from her usual aesthetic in a more abstract project. Her current exhibition, Scenes of a Romantic Nature, draws on her connection to Germany by referencing the landscape paintings of German artist Caspar David Friedrich.

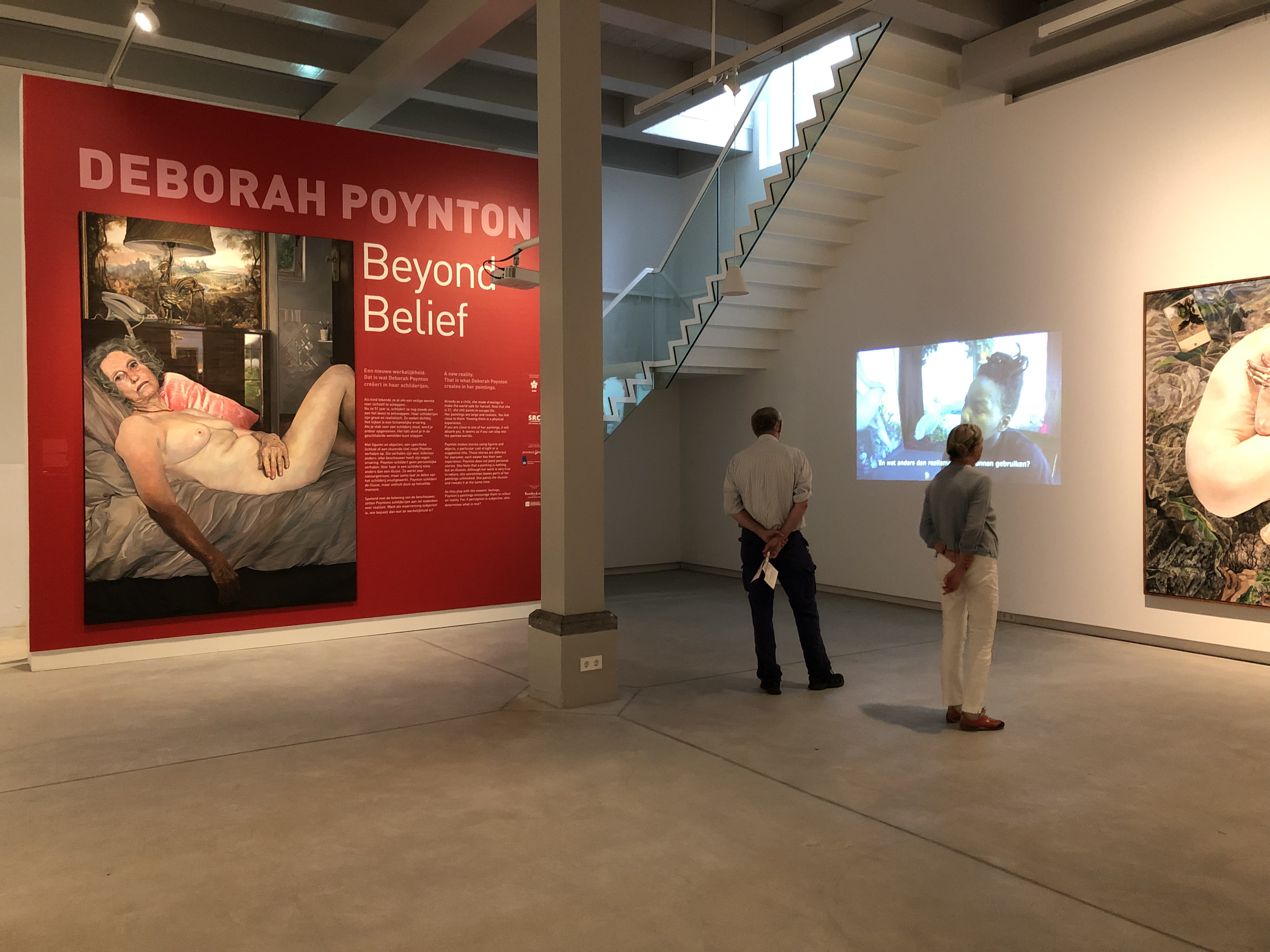
Deborah Poynton’s work at the Drents Museum in Assen, 11 July to 3 October 2021

Her work often conflates tropes from traditional art history, from compositional techniques to poses of her subjects, and the indices of contemporary life to create a sense of chaotic inscrutability; in this way, Poynton creates work which is aesthetically engaging and intellectually confounding. This quality of her work is exemplified in her series Safety & Security, 2006.

From 11 July to 3 October 2021, Deborah Poynton’s most recent work was on display at the Drents Museum in Assen. The exhibition entitled Beyond Belief was Poynton's first museum exhibition in Europe.
