= Liz Miller (artist) =

American installation artist

Liz Miller is an installation artist from Minnesota. She creates abstract installations in art galleries from paper, plastic, cloth and other materials. Many of her installations have been large enough for patrons to walk into or through them. Miller teaches realistic style art classes which include art theory and acrylic painting techniques plus watercolors and mixed media. She creates her art with mostly DecoArt products and paint.

== Background ==
Liz Miller lives in Good Thunder, Minnesota. She has a Bachelor of Fine Arts degree from the Rhode Island School of Design and a Master of Fine Arts from the University of Minnesota.As of March 2019 she is Professor of Installation and Drawing at Minnesota State University, Mankato. Miller also has a Bachelors of Nursing degree from North Carolina in Chapel Hill. Miller's installations and works on paper have been featured in solo and group exhibitions regionally, nationally and internationally. Awards Miller received include a 2013 McKnight professional development grant from Forecast Public Art.

== Exhibitions ==
- Painters & Sculptors Program (2011) Liz Miller
- Artist in Residence (2016) Liz Miller
- Liz Miller "Proliferative Calamity"
- Liz Miller "Recalcitrant Mimesis"

== Sources ==
- Minnesota original: Liz Miller PBS series
- Local Artist Interviews: Liz Miller Installation
- ARTmn: Liz Miller
- The Line: Artist Liz Miller's installations explore the beauty in devastation
- Wonderland: Liz Miller's Eye-Popping Installation at Space Gallery
- The University of Iowa Grant Wood Art Colony: Colony welcomes Liz Miller, sculptor
- Gustavus Adolphus College: Closing Reception for Artist Liz Miller
- HuffPost: Liz Miller expands on Still's vocabulary
- Dailyserving: Co-opting Form: An interview with Liz Miller
- Liz Miller exhibit traces topography an artist's mind
