= Katie Gallagher =

American fashion designer

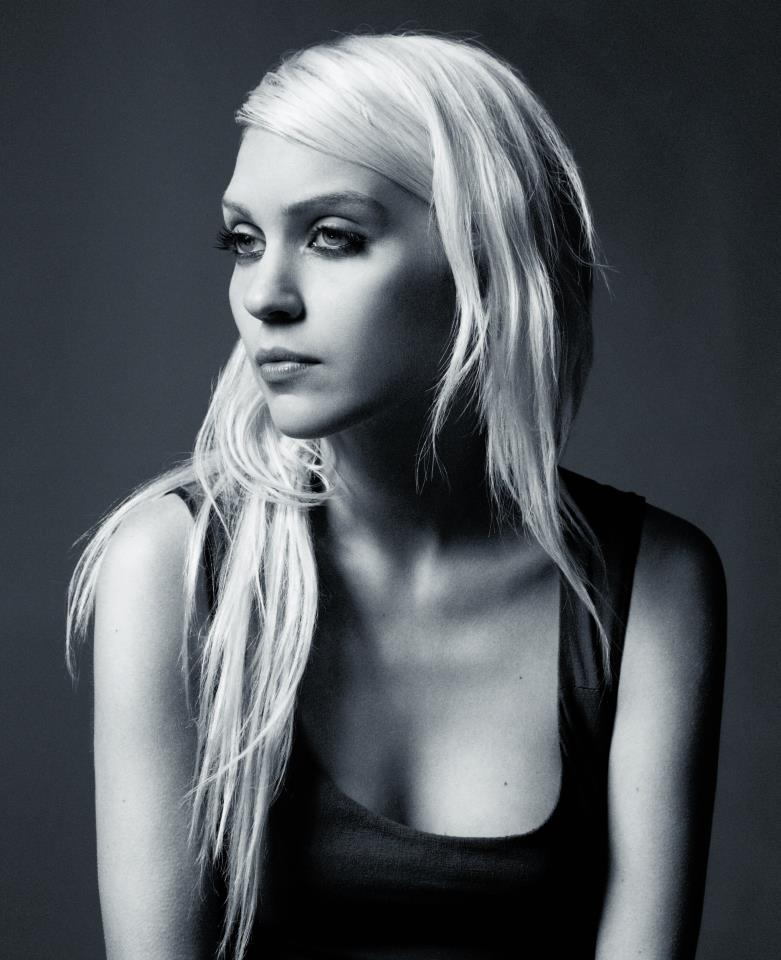
- Katie Gallagher portrait (2012)
- Born: August 15, 1986; Pennsylvania, U.S.
- Died: July 23, 2022 (aged 35); New York City, U.S.
- Education: Rhode Island School of Design
- Label: Katie Gallagher

Kathryn Marie "'Katie" Gallagher (August 15, 1986 – July 23, 2022) was an American fashion designer and founder of her own brand in New York City. Gallagher's designs were featured in Vogue Italia, Elle, Interview magazine, and Refinery 29 magazines. Refinery 29 identified as one of six designers to watch. In January 2010, Gallagher was named as a semi-finalist in the 2009/2010 Ecco Domani Fashion Foundation search for emerging fashion designers.

== Early life and education ==
Katie Gallagher was born in western Pennsylvania and spent her early childhood there. About her youth, Gallagher said, "I never wore shoes, and I hated wearing clothes (but always wore my cat on my head)!" From seventh grade through high school, she lived in State College, Pennsylvania, and taught herself to sew. She shopped for vintage clothes, and altered them on a little Singer sewing machine.

Gallagher declared apparel design as her major after her freshman year at the Rhode Island School of Design. Her first apparel design project at RISD was a dress fabricated from springs she made herself. Gallagher interned for Anna Sui during the summer following her sophomore year, and for threeASFOUR between her junior and senior years and also during winter break in her senior year. Her senior thesis project was a collection entirely in black. The collection included tailored dresses, silk and leather jackets, and detailing that included silver chains and ruffles. The work that Gallagher produced at RISD attracted the attention of fashion magazines including Interview magazine and Vogue Italia, and buyers from fashion boutiques SEVEN New York in New York and I.T in Hong Kong. Magazine editors began to interview Gallagher during her senior year. Katie Gallagher graduated with a Bachelor of Fine Arts in Apparel Design degree in 2009.

== Career ==
Gallagher moved to New York City and established "Katie Gallagher". She moved to the Chinatown area of Manhattan. Gallagher began work on her SS10 (spring/summer 2010) collection in anticipation of showing the apparel at New York Fashion Week in September 2009. She made sketches and paintings to establish the design for the line prior to fabrication. The SS10 collection, entitled "Veil", was well received by the press. She submitted photos of the line to the Ecco Domani Fashion Foundation for consideration in their 2009/2010 search for emerging designers. In January 2010, Gallagher was notified that she was a semi-finalist in the Ecco Domani Fashion Foundation 2009/2010 search.

Gallagher presented collections for SS10, AW10, SS11, AW11, SS12, and AW12 at New York Fashion Week. Her SS10 collection was called "darkly futuristic, sleek" in Refinery 29. "The Heart of the Woods and What I Found There", her AW10 collection, featured "dark layered separates, with flashes of cream, grey and green". Considered "sporty yet aggressive", Gallagher's SS11 collection, "Arena", was inspired by athletics, in particular running. "Gris-Gris", her AW11 collection named after the voodoo talisman bag, featured "grays and blacks, asymmetries and paradoxical volumes", and "heavily blackened eyes, and a cyborg-esque eye detail". In discussing her SS12 collection, "Red Red Blood", Gallagher specified that it was, "Not the blood of nightmares of brutality, but the blood that's sanguine, living and the brightest red." Detailing included makeup inspired by the bloodstream, and hair inspired by the heart. AW12 "Silent Soil" was inspired by the forest. The collection featured fabrics including boiled wool, shearling, leather, silk, and chiffon. Gallagher's "trademark" leggings were used in the collection, but not highlighted as in past shows.

Selected designs from Katie Gallagher's work have been pulled, borrowed for editorial shoots, by Daphne Guinness, and on a continuing basis by Lady Gaga's stylist, Nicola Formichetti. The list of stockists for the Katie Gallagher line has grown to include high-end stores around the world.

In explaining her method of designing, Gallagher said, "Everything I make starts with my paintings, which I've done every season prior to construction. I love to try to re-create a three-dimensional version of whatever I've drawn; it requires pretty unconventional pattern-making."

On November 5, 2012, Gallagher launched the Katie by Katie Gallagher diffusion line of clothing that includes both separates and jewelry pieces.

== Death ==
Katie died unexpectedly at her home in New York City on July 23, 2022. On March 24, 2023, the NYPD announced that her death was ruled a homicide. Her death was later connected to a series of drug-facilitated robberies and in December 2023, 33-year-old Kenwood Allen was charged for the crime spree.

== Designer collections ==
- SS10 "Veil" was shown in September 2009 at New York Fashion Week at The Tribeca Grand Hotel.
- AW10 "The Heart of the Woods and What I Found There" was shown in February 2010 at New York Fashion Week at The Soho Grand Hotel.
- SS11 "Arena" was shown in September 2010 at Stoll. New York Fashion Week.
- AW11 "Gris-Gris" was shown in February 2011 at New York Fashion Week at Milk Studios.
- SS12 "Red Red Blood" was shown in September 2011 at New York Fashion Week at Milk Studios and Paris Fashion Week at Stealth Projekt.
- AW12 "Silent Soil" was shown in February 2012 at New York Fashion Week at The Standard Hotel and Paris Fashion Week at Stealth Projekt.
- SS13 "Everything Forever" was shown in September 2012 at New York Fashion Week at The Standard Hotel.
- AW13 "The Winter Froze You Away" was shown in February 2013 at New York Fashion Week at The Standard Hotel.
- SS14 "Bloom" was shown in September 2013 at New York Fashion Week at 55 Gansevoort.
- FW14 "Wonderworld" was shown in February 2014 at New York Fashion Week at The Highline Hotel.
- SS15 "Fantasm" was shown in September 2014 at New York Fashion Week at The Highline Hotel.
- FW15 "Navy Eyes" was shown in February 2015 at New York Fashion Week at Pier 59 Studios.
- SS16 "Chinatown" was shown in September 2015 at New York Fashion Week at Supermarket Gallery and Paris Fashion Week.
- FW16 "Veiled" was shown in February 2016 at New York Fashion Week at The Roxy Hotel.
- SS17 "Eclipse" was shown in September 2016 at New York Fashion Week at Foley Gallery.
- FW17 "Hallow" was shown in February 2017 at New York Fashion Week at Projective Space.
- SS18 "Rain" was shown in September 2017 at New York Fashion Week at 725 Washington Street.
- FW18 "True Red" was shown in February 2018 at New York Fashion Week at Mailroom NYC 110 Wall Street.
- SS19 "Rosemary" was shown in September 2018 at New York Fashion Week and Paris Fashion Week.
- FW19 "TenTenTen" was shown in February 2019 at New York Fashion Week and Paris Fashion Week.
- SS20 "Bath House" was shown in September 2019 at New York Fashion Week and Paris Fashion Week.
- FW20 "The Danger of Tears" was shown in February 2020 at New York Fashion Week and Paris Fashion Week.
- SS21 "Orpiment" was shown in September 2020 at New York Fashion Week via CFDARunway360.
- FW21 "Ocean Grey" was shown in February 2021 at New York Fashion week via CFDARunway360.
- SS21 "Cicadas" was shown in October 2021 during Paris Fashion Week.
- FW22 "Chordeva" was shown in February 2022 during New York Fashion Week.
