= Arthur S. Douglas =

American painter (1860–1949)

- Born: July 11, 1860; Phenix, Rhode Island, U.S.
- Died: August 25, 1949 (aged 89); Providence, Rhode Island, U.S.
- Resting place: Greenwood Cemetery, West Warwick, Rhode Island
- Education: Rhode Island School of Design

Arthur S. Douglas (July 1, 1860 – August 25, 1949) was an American landscape painter and printmaker and one of the earliest students at Rhode Island School of Design.

== Biography ==
Douglas was son of James and Mary Douglas. He was born on July 11, 1860, in Phenix, Rhode Island.

At the age of eighteen, Arthur enrolled in the new art school being founded by a member of a prominent Rhode Island family, Helen Adelia Rowe Metcalf. Mrs. Metcalf belonged to the Centennial Women, a group formed to raise funds for Rhode Island's exhibit at the Centennial Exposition in 1876. The group had $1,675 remaining after the event. Inspired by foreign exhibits on design and interior decorating Metcalf persuaded the group to donate the money to found what would become the Rhode Island School of Design. Metcalf directed the school until her death in 1895. Her daughter, Eliza Greene Metcalf Radeke, then took over until her death in 1931. Even in its infancy RISD was a creative watershed for emerging artists, design students and art collectors.

At the age of 18, Arthur Douglas enrolled in the first school term and is listed on the school registry as a day student, number # 68. During the eight terms Douglas spent at RISD, he was often used as a pupil instructor in lieu of student tuition, which was twenty dollars per term for days and six dollars per term for evenings.

While attending RISD, Douglas exhibited with the newly formed Providence Art Club at their first exhibit held April 7 – May 7, 1881, and sold his painting Head of Fighting Gladiator for $40. At the 2nd Providence Art Club exhibition held November 15 – December 20, 1881, he sold: Sunset at Rocky Point for $15 and Old Wreck at Narragansett Pier for $10.

Among the contributors to this Providence Art Club exhibition were such notables as Sydney Richmond Burleigh, an outstanding water colorist of that era (Douglas is mentioned in Sydney Burleigh's Art Club Scrapbook). Charles Walter Stetson, a famous etcher, as well as W. Woodward and Edward Bannister. After reviewing this exhibition, artist George Whitaker wrote in the December 3, 1881, issue of the Providence Journal, that "Arthur Douglas of the Rhode Island School of Design showed meritorious work".

Upon graduation from RISD, Douglas traveled in Europe as a companion to a wealthy person. While in Yorkshire, UK, he painted landscapes and seascapes of the North Sea Coast; three water colors are East Cliffs, Whitby (Auctioned at Christie's Fine Art Auction May 22, 1991, lot 99), Off of Whitby Harbor (Auctioned at Sloan and Company Fine Art Auction September 15, 1991, lot 2282) and Castle Hill, Scarborough (Auctioned at Sloan and Company Fine Art Auction October 26, 1991, lot 1718).

During the years of 1890 through 1894, Douglas established an engraving company in Phenix, RI - Arthur S. Douglas and Company.

At some point, Douglas opened his own studio in the Lapham Building, Providence and thereafter moved to College Street, where he continued painting and teaching. In 1918 he exhibited 2 paintings with the Society of Independent Artists, #215 Brook, #216 A Day in June.

Later he established studio in his home on Sackett Street, where he did commissioned portraits. He developed cancer of the esophagus. The last three years of his life were spent in a nursing home on Blackstone Street in Providence. By this time indigent, unable to speak, and taking medication to ease his pain, he continued to paint and give lessons in brush techniques, color mixing, spacing and balancing of a painting's subject matter. Arthur Douglas died on August 25, 1949, at the age of 89 in Providence, Rhode Island. He was interred in Greenwood Cemetery, West Warwick, Rhode Island.

The 27 works of this Arthur Douglas Collection were exhibited at the Providence Water Color Club on May 18 through the 25th, 1968, at 6 Thomas Street, formerly Angell's Lane. This collection is a visual testimony of a dedicated Rhode Island artist who was one of the first to graduates of the Rhode Island School of Design.
