= Charles Poynton =

Canadian technology writer

Charles A. Poynton is a Canadian technical consultant and writer based in Toronto. He gives seminars on digital video systems and has written two books, A Technical Introduction to Digital Video (Wiley, 1996; ISBN 0-471-12253-X) and Digital Video and HDTV: Algorithms and Interfaces (Morgan Kaufmann, 2003; ISBN 1-55860-792-7). He is currently a columnist at Spectracal.com.

Poynton is a Fellow of SMPTE, and was awarded the David Sarnoff Gold Medal in 1993 for his work to "integrate video technology with computing and communications". He is also a Fellow of the Colorist Society International (CSI).

He is a popular teacher of seminars and travels widely for this purpose.

In 1981, he founded Poynton Vector Corporation to design and build digital television processing equipment for NASA's Johnson Space Center. From 1985 to 1995, this equipment converted the field-sequential color television signal from the Space Shuttle to NTSC, for viewing, recording, and distribution to television networks.
