= Kevin Zucker (artist) =

American artist (born 1976)

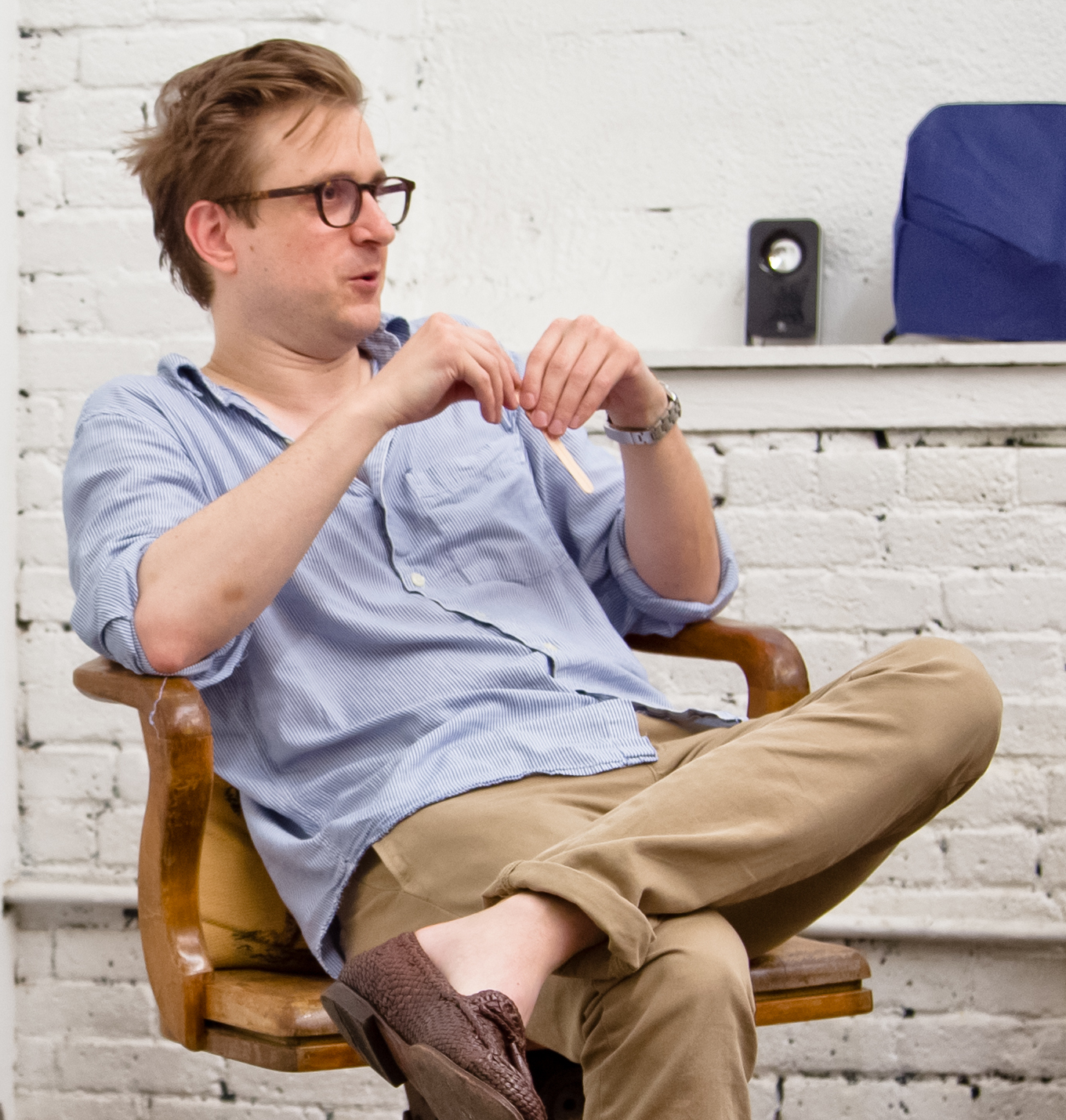
Zucker in his studio in 2013

Kevin Zucker (born 1976) is an American artist who lives and works in New York City.

== Life ==
The artist received a BFA from the Rhode Island School of Design in 2000, and an MFA from Columbia University in 2002.

Zucker's work has been exhibited in high-profile museum shows at PS1 Contemporary Art Center, the Brooklyn Museum, the New Museum of Contemporary Art, the Moore Space and others. He is represented by 11R Gallery in New York and has had solo exhibitions at noteworthy galleries internationally, including Mary Boone Gallery, Greenberg Van Doren Gallery, and Zach Feuer Gallery (LFL) in New York, Linn Luehn in Cologne, Paolo Curti in Milan and Arario Gallery in Beijing.

Zucker works in painting, drawing and photography. His primary subject is the conception of fictional spaces, conceived with the aid of computers and information found on the internet and executed by mixing digital and traditional painting, drawing and printmaking techniques. He currently teaches as a full-time faculty member of the Rhode Island School of Design Painting department.

== Reviews ==
- "Artforum review of Kevin Zucker exhibition". Artforum. 45 (8).
- "November, 2007 review of Kevin Zucker in Art in America magazine". Art in America. November 2007. Archived from the original on October 13, 2008 – via FindArticles.

== Curatorial Projects ==
- VIEW THIRTEEN: PRACTICAL F/X: Exhibition curated by Kevin Zucker at Mary Boone Gallery, NY
