= Sig Gissler =

American former professor of journalism

Sig Gissler is an American former professor of journalism at Columbia University and the former administrator of the Pulitzer Prize.

== Biography ==
Sig Gissler was born in Chicago. He is a graduate of Lake Forest College and completed graduate work in political science at Northwestern University. After writing for the Libertyville Independent-Register and serving as executive editor of the Waukegan News-Sun, he joined The Milwaukee Journal in 1967.

Following a Knight Fellowship at Stanford University in 1976, he became editorial page editor of the Journal; in 1985, he was appointed editor of the newspaper. During his tenure, the Journal assembled a more diverse staff and completed a year-long examination of racial issues in 1991.

After his nominal retirement in 1993, he taught at Stanford and Indiana Universities as a visiting professor. In 1994, he joined the full-time faculty of the Columbia University Graduate School of Journalism, where he served as a senior fellow at the now-defunct Freedom Forum Media Studies Center; spearheaded a Ford Foundation-sponsored workshop on journalism, race and ethnicity ("Let's Do It Better"); and taught seminars on new media and the coverage of racial and ethnic issues in urban America in addition to the Journalism School's introductory reporting and writing course. In 2002, he received the Columbia University Presidential Teaching Award. From 2002 to 2014, he served as the administrator of the Pulitzer Prizes while remaining a special faculty member at the Graduate School of Journalism.

As administrator, he declined to revoke the controversial Pulitzer Prize awarded to Walter Duranty. In a press release of 21 November 2003, he stated that with regard to the 13 articles by Duranty from 1931 submitted for the award "there was not clear and convincing evidence of deliberate deception, the relevant standard in this case."
