= American Psycho (conceptual novel) =

American Psycho is a conceptual artist's book by Mimi Cabell and Jason Huff, based on the 1991 novel by Bret Easton Ellis. The entire text of Ellis's novel was sent through Gmail, one page at a time, to collect Google's contextual advertisements generated for each page. The advertisements were used to annotate the original text as footnotes, and Ellis's body text was then erased — leaving only chapter titles and constellations of ad-derived footnotes. The physical book, published by Traumawien in 2012, replicates the design of the 1991 Vintage Contemporaries first edition and runs to 408 pages.

== Background ==
Cabell and Huff, both Rhode Island School of Design MFA graduates, created the work in 2010. The project exploited Gmail's then-active practice of scanning email content to generate targeted advertising. By emailing the full text of Ellis's novel page by page, they generated 819 contextual advertisements across the length of the book. The results revealed patterns in Google's algorithmic reading: violent passages generated ads for knives and knife sharpeners, while a passage containing a racial slur caused all ads to disappear. The most frequently appearing ad, for Crest Whitestrips, appeared alongside both the most graphic and most mundane sections with no discernible logic.

A PDF edition was also released through Traumawien, with the original Ellis text rendered in white (invisible in print but recoverable by copying and pasting in a PDF reader), an intentional gesture toward subversive filesharing.

== Publication ==
The book was first published in 2012 by Traumawien, a Vienna-based independent publisher of conceptual digital literature active from 2010 to 2016. It is carried by Printed Matter in New York.

The work has a dedicated entry in Library of Artistic Print on Demand: Post-Digital Publishing in Times of Platform Capitalism (Spector Books, 2025), a 720-page hardcover publication edited by Annette Gilbert and Andreas Bülhoff and distributed by ARTBOOK | D.A.P. It is also referenced in Hannes Bajohr's essay "Print on Demand as Strategy and Genre: Auto-Factography and Post-Digital Writing" within the same volume.

== Exhibitions ==
- Erreur d'impression — Jeu de Paume, Paris, 2012.
- Collect the WWWorld: The Artist as Archivist in the Internet Age — 319 Scholes, Brooklyn, New York, 2012. Curated by Domenico Quaranta. Other artists in the exhibition included JODI, Jon Rafman, Ryan Trecartin, Penelope Umbrico, Evan Roth, Clement Valla, Oliver Laric, and Eva and Franco Mattes.
- Young Artists' Biennial — Bucharest, Romania.
- Library of the Printed Web — curated by Paul Soulellis. Soulellis used the work as a primary example in his taxonomy of printed-web practices, categorizing it under "performing" — artists using a procedural methodology with a narrative that materializes between web and print.

== Collections ==
The work is included in the Library of the Printed Web, a collection of 244 web-to-print artists' publications by 130 artists founded by Paul Soulellis in 2013. The collection was acquired in its entirety by the MoMA Library in January 2017, where it is preserved as a self-contained archive with its own call number designation and is accessible to the public by appointment.

== Reception ==
=== Academic ===
Karl Wolfgang Flender published a full-length academic article, "American Psycho: Reading an Algorithm in Reverse," in Interface Critique Journal (Heidelberg University Press, 2019), analyzing the work as media archaeology and algorithmic critique.

Kaja Marczewska published "Erasing in the Algorithmic Extreme: Mimi Cabell and Jason Huff's American Psycho" in Media-N Journal (New Media Caucus, Vol. 11, No. 1, 2015), a peer-reviewed essay examining the work through lenses of erasure, data politics, and algorithmic criticism. The essay is also archived in the Westminster Research repository at the University of Westminster.

The work is discussed in Alessandro Ludovico's Post-Digital Print: The Mutation of Publishing Since 1894 as an example of processual publishing in the post-digital era.

=== Press ===
The project received international press coverage in 2014 following the release of the PDF edition, including articles in Electric Literature, Dazed Digital, the Daily Dot, and Adweek.

The work was also discussed in Jacket2 (University of Pennsylvania) in the critical essay "The POD People," examining print-on-demand artist's books, and in the New Criticals essay "The Printed Web."

== See also ==
- Conceptual writing
- Erasure (art form)
- Artist's book
- Traumawien
- Library of the Printed Web
- Contextual advertising
