= Anouk Kruithof =

Dutch artist (born 1981)

Anouk Kruithof (born 1981 in Dordrecht, the Netherlands) is a transdisciplinary visual artist, who lives and works between Brussels, Belgium; Berlin, Germany; and Botopasi, Suriname.

Her practice engages with social themes and their relation to digital visual culture, drawing on the surplus of online images and their impact on human connectivity, mental health, and geopolitical awareness. Her work encompasses various media, including photography, sculpture, collage, video and animation, artist books, installation, websites, text, performance, and social, community-based projects.

Kruithof's work has been widely recognised and exhibited internationally, including at MoMA in New York as part of “Ocean of Images” (2015), as well as through solo exhibitions at Museum Tinguely in Basel, Centro de la Imagen in Mexico City, Stedelijk Museum in Amsterdam, Kunsthal Rotterdam, FOAM in Amsterdam, and Viernulvier (formerly Vooruit) in Ghent, Belgium. Her works are included in the public collections of institutions such as SF MoMA in San Francisco, Aperture Foundation in New York, Fotomuseum Winterthur in Switzerland, Museum Folkwang in Essen, Stedelijk Museum in Amsterdam, Centraal Museum in Utrecht, and Museum Voorlinden in Wassenaar.

== Early life and education ==
Kruithof was born in Dordrecht, the Netherlands. She received her early education at Johan De Witt Gymnasium in Dordrecht. In 1999, she moved to Breda and pursued studies in Fine Arts at the Academy of Art and Design St. Joost, focusing on photography and sculpture. In 2003, she graduated with a Bachelor of Fine Arts in photography.

In 2008, she became a resident at Künstlerhaus Bethanien in Berlin. Since then, she has lived in Berlin, New York City, Mexico City, Botopasi, and Brussels for extended periods, and has traveled to over 40 countries worldwide. The recognition and experience of different cultural contexts have been influential factors in her artistic work.

== Art practice ==
Kruithof's body of work focuses at large on the representation of the acute global social matters reflecting on post-internet human condition linked to excessive image production, post production and circulation. She works through observation and a large collection of images, including online viral contents, which depict urgent global phenomena, such as the consequences of climate change, the impacts of globalization, the environmental pollution, the government surveillance, the privacy and social inequality. Her works emanate colorful visuality, empathy, and, at times, humor, often linked to human relations, dialogue, and storytelling. The themes in her work frequently activate tension between the natural, the artificial, and the technological. Her multifaceted projects are often created in the spirit of positive reflection and engagement with the affective impact of digital culture on the contemporary human psyche, addressing issues like alienation, anxiety, exhaustion, discomfort, shame, or self-validation.

In her practice, Kruithof reflects the complexity of globalization through the use of various media, the reuse of found images and materials, as well as through the abundance and quantity of these elements met in specific forms of her projects.A substantial role in Kruithof's practice plays the transformation of the image through sculptures, videos, and large scale immersive installations, expanding the understanding of photography and visual culture through its translation into a physical object.

Tracing the paradoxes of visual language and global ethical dilemmas, Kruithof's work often operates through mechanisms inscribed in the problems she critically and playfully addresses. The creation of her works entails an ecological process by means of recycling, re-use, as well as references to the capitalist culture through accumulation, image appropriation and excess. Her work talks about juxtaposed qualities of physical and digital, and converses with motives of universality, individualism, liberation, spiritual and natural wisdom, oppressiveness, embodiment and technology, dystopia, and joy, approached both critically and openly.

Many of Kruithof's projects revolve through collective engagement and relationship with temporary or local communities, as well as research-oriented teamwork. Highlighting the technological mediation of the world, her work remains close to the human sensibility of its understanding, feeling, living and transforming, as well as to the notions of natural resources and their potentiality.

== Notable work ==
Universal Tongue (2018–2021) is the most notable work by Anouk Kruithof. It has been presented at over 35 international exhibitions, including solo shows at Museum Tinguely in Basel, Switzerland, and Kunsthal Rotterdam in the Netherlands. It was also part of the WHOLE United Queer Festival at Orangerie Ferropolis in Germany and belongs to several museum collections, such as Frac Alsace in France, Museum Het Nieuwe Domein in Sittard, Museum Folkwang in Essen, Germany, and Museum Voorlinden in Wassenaar, the Netherlands.

Universal Tongue is a multifaceted project that reflects on the phenomenon of dance as a universal global expression—drawing from online found footage of viral movement trends, animated videos, and traditional and social dances. The project is based on a database of 1,000 categorized dance styles created by the artist together with a team of 52 researchers, leading to the creation of an 8-channel video installation, a book publication, and a single-channel video edition. Universal Tongue highlights the friction between the universal and particular connectedness of human expression in the digital era.

Many of Kruithof's works revolve around collective engagement and relationships with temporary or local communities, as well as research oriented on teamwork and collaboration, as seen in projects like Universal Tongue, El Camino Abierto, Niet Meer Normaal, and Happy Birthday to You.

In Happy Birthday to You, Anouk Kruithof engaged with 10 patients of the Altrecht psychiatric unit in Den Dolder, The Netherlands during her artistic residency at Het Vijfde Seizoen in 2011. Kruithof interviewed the 10 patients about their birthday wishes and then celebrated it with and for them according to these wishes. The project resulted in an artist book publication.

El Camino Abierto (2018) was developed as part of Kruithof's residency at Fundación Casa Wabi, in collaboration with a group of children in the village of Cacalote, Oaxaca, Mexico. The artist created a massive temporary arch-like sculpture at Casa Wabi, made from all the piñatas collectively created by the children.

In 2022, Anouk Kruithof created Niet Meer Normaal (Eng. No Longer Normal), which invited over 300 participants of all ages to creatively respond to the notions of “common sense” and default social norms, as well as rare natural phenomena. Niet Meer Normaal was a monumental immersive artwork with scenography and a soundscape based on the diverse contributions of participants. It was created for the Kunstkerk art center in Dordrecht, the Netherlands.

Among other recognized works by Anouk Kruithof is the installation Enclosed Content Chatting Away in the Colour Invisibility (2009), an early photography series Becoming Blue (2006–2009), the art project #Evidence (2015), and the video work Ice Cry Baby (2017).

Enclosed Content Chatting Away in the Colour Invisibility consists of an installation of approximately 3,500 found books, a video loop with sound, and a photograph. The installation, resembling a wall or an illusory, colorful landscape, was constructed from 20th-century second-hand publications. Most of the books, published during the era of the German Democratic Republic and Eastern Europe, were collected and bought by the artist in Berlin. Referencing a specific historical period, Enclosed Content Chatting Away in the Colour Invisibility reflects on the status of neglected cultural goods in the age of advancing digitalization. It was first presented at Künstlerhaus Bethanien in Berlin and has been exhibited over 10 times at venues such as Musée des Beaux-Arts du Locle, Capitain Petzel gallery in Berlin, Museum Het Nieuwe Domein in Sittard, and Stedelijk Museum Schiedam. In 2021, it was acquired by Museum Voorlinden in Wassenaar for its permanent collection.

Becoming Blue features 21 portraits and three spatial stills. The project juxtaposes the blue color associated with calmness against the distorted expressions of the photographed individuals. The artwork highlights the representation of the mental state of contemporary Western European society, largely influenced by stress and the pressure to perform. Three portraits from the Becoming Blue series are part of the permanent collection at SF MoMA.

#Evidence, a series of different works, such as sculpture and collages, was created while the artist lived in New York City, and was inspired by Larry Sultan and Mike Mandel's book “Evidence”. Using a large collection of screenshots from Instagram accounts of corporations, government agencies and institutions, Kruithof appropriated and recontextualised the meaning of their promotional materials into new messages and intentions, provoking a conversation around digital futures.

Ice Cry Baby is a compilation of found YouTube videos of melting ice and collapsing glaciers. It addresses the human-nature relationship in a technologically mediated world and explores the tendency towards spectacular aesthetics within a global dystopian perspective.

In 2023, the Centre Photographique d'Île-de-France in Paris opened a solo exhibition titled Tentacle Togetherness of Anouk Kruithof, showcasing works produced between 2013 and 2022. The exhibition focused on the artist's multimedia approach, presenting a collection of her photo sculptures and video collages created over a decade of artistic practice.

== Publications ==
The medium of the artist book plays an important role in Kruithof's practice. She has published 15 art books, including publications linked to her most notable works, such as Becoming Blue, Universal Tongue, and Niet Meer Normaal. She has also published standalone art books, such as A Head with Wings, Automagic and Happy Birthday to You.

In 2023, Be Like Water was published by Mousse in Milan, Italy. It is a retrospective book that gathers a large selection of Kruithof's works created over 20 years of her artistic career, spanning from 2002 to 2023.

Anouk Kruithof has received multiple awards and nominations for her publications. Her work has been recognized at the Rencontres Arles Book Award, where Universal Tongue received a nomination for Best Author in 202. Automagic was nominated for PhotoEye Best Books in 2016, and A Head with Wings was nominated for the Paris Photo Aperture Photobook Award in 2012. Additionally, The Bungalow won The Best Dutch Book Designs award from the Stedelijk Museum Amsterdam in 2015, and Het Zwarte Gat / The Black Hole received the Unique Photography Book Award in 2005, among other accolades.

=== Publications by Kruithof ===
- 2023 Be Like Water, Milan: Mousse, ISBN 978-88-67495-71-9; Writers: Lucia Tkáčová, Francesco Zanot, Mathilde Roman, Anouk Kruithof, Designer: Roosje Klap.
- 2022 Niet Meer Normaal (self-published), ISBN 978-90-81708-14-2; Writers: Anouk Kruithof, Designer: Doris Boerman.
- 2021 Trans Human Nature (self-published), ISBN 978-94-91677-23-6; Writer: Mathilde Roman, Designer: Doris Boerman.
- 2021 Universal Tongue, Ghent: Art Paper Editions, ISBN 978-94-93146-68-6, Writers: international researchers, Ula Kahul, Anouk Kruithof, Designer: Jurgen Maelfeyt.
- 2016 AUTOMAGIC, Barcelona: Editorial RM, ISBN 8416282528, Writers: Inaki Domingo, Anouk Kruithof, Designer: Piera Wolf.
- 2016 Neutral, Munich: Galerie Jo van de Loo; Writer: Christoph Sehl, Designer : Quentin Walesch.
- 2014 The Bungalow, Eindhoven: Onomatopee, ISBN 978-94-91677-23-6; Writers: Brad Feuerhelm, Freek Lomme, Anouk Kruithof, Designer: Christof Nüssli.
- 2014 Untitled (I've Taken Too Many Photos / I've Never Taken a Photo Book) (self-published), ISBN 978-90-81708-10-4; Designer: Christof Nüssli.
- 2013 Pixel Stress, Paris: RVB-books, ISBN 979-10-90306-21-9, Designer: Remi Faucheux.
- 2011 A Head with Wings, Minneapolis: Little Brown Mushroom, OCLC 760918291; Writer: Anouk Kruithof, Designer: Hans Seeger, Commissioned by Alec Soth.
- 2011 Lang Zal Ze Leven / Happy Birthday to You (self-published), ISBN 978-90-81708-11-1; Writer, Designer: Anouk Kruithof.
- 2010 The Daily Exhaustion, Baden: Kodoji Press, ISBN 978-3-03747-034-3, Designer: Winfried Heininger.
- 2009 Playing Borders (This Contemporary State of Mind), Berlin: Revolver Publishing by VVV, ISBN 978-3-86895-040-3; Designer: kummer-herrman.
- 2009 Becoming Blue, Berlin: Revolver Publishing by VVV, ISBN 978-3-86895-024-3; Writer: Christoph Tannert, Designer: kummer-herrman.
- 2006 Het Zwarte Gat / The Black Hole, Rotterdam: Episode Publishers, ISBN 9059730445; Poem: Leon van den Langenbergh, Design: Hans Gremmen.

=== Publications with contributions by Kruithof ===
- The Riso Book: New York. San Francisco, CA: Colpa; New York, NY: Endless Editions, 2014. Kruithof with Paul Branca, David Horvitz, Matthew Palladino and Dexter Sinister. Each artist contributed to 20 pages. Fifth in The Riso Book series. Edition of 100 copies.
- Photographers' Sketchbooks. London: Thames & Hudson, 2014. ISBN 9780500544341. Edited by Stephen McLaren and Bryan Formhals.
- Printed Web #4: Public, Private, Secret. Paul Soulellis; Library of the Printed Web and International Center of Photography Museum, 2016. ISBN 978-0-9840052-8-4. 40 pages. Published on the occasion of an exhibition, Public, Private, Secret, at the International Center of Photography Museum, 2016/17. Print-on-demand newsprint. Work by Kruithof, Wolfgang Plöger, Lorna Mills, Molly Soda, Travess Smalley, Angela Genusa, Eva and Franco Mattes, Elisabeth Tonnard, and Christopher Clary. With a text by Michael Connor ("Folding the Web").

== Pedagogy & Other Professional Engagements ==
In addition to her art practice, Anouk Kruithof also writes, lectures, educates, curates, and participates in socially engaged projects.

She has conducted workshops at ECAL - University of Art and Design in Lausanne, Switzerland; the International Summer School of Photography in Kuldiga, Latvia; Wesleyan University in Middletown, USA; and Stedelijk Museum in Amsterdam, the Netherlands. She has given lectures at Columbia University, Pratt Institute, and the International Center of Photography in New York City; Museo Universitario Arte Contemporáneo (MUAC) in Mexico City; Tate in London; and Deichtorhallen in Hamburg, Germany. She has written for Metropolis M, Aperture Photobook Review, and 1000 Words magazine, among others.

In 2024, Anouk was a jury member and curator for the Limburg Biennale at Marres in Maastricht, the Netherlands. In 2016, she curated the 6th Annual Zine and Self-Published Photo Book Fair at CCNY in New York City.

Between 2015 and 2018, she was a co-creator, director, and jury member of The Anamorphosis Prize, which awarded $10,000, no strings attached, to the creator of the best self-published photobook from the previous year. The prize was launched for the first time in spring 2015 and celebrated three editions.

== Life and work in Botopasi, Suriname ==
Since 2019, Anouk Kruithof has periodically lived and worked in Botopasi, a small village in the Amazon rainforest in Suriname. Connected to the local community, the artist pursues part of her artistic projects in Botopasi and engages in restorative and charity work for the village.

In 2023, she collected necessary funds through a private campaign to support the renovation of the building of the only primary school in Botopasi. The campaign raised over 15,000 euros, which allowed for the purchase and transportation of construction materials and covered the salaries of many workers, painters, and others. In 2022, she helped organize a new water pump for the village, which provides water to all houses in Botopasi from the river.

One of her artistic projects conducted in the region is Trans-Human Nature (2021), a series of photographic works that portray the relationship between the natural symbiosis of the rainforest and the use of high technology. In 2024, she began hosting Dutch creatives of Surinamese descent at her home for short stays. This initiative was intended to deepen the understanding of Saramacca culture, the ecologies of the Amazon rainforest, and the Botopasi community. Her first guest was the painter, Iris Kensmil.

== Exhibitions, Awards, Collections ==
Selected Solo Exhibitions

- 2024 Whirlwind, Raamwerk, Centraal Museum, Utrecht, Netherlands
- 2024 Vivre Vite (Grégory Cuquel & Anouk Kruithof), Image/Imatge, Orthez, France
- 2024 Universal Tongue, Kunsthal, Rotterdam, Netherlands
- 2023 Universal Tongue, Le Confort Moderne, Poitiers, France
- 2023 Tentacle Togetherness, Centre Photographique d'Ile-de-France, Pontault-Combault, France
- 2023 The Toes You Step on Today Might Be Connected to the Ass You're Kissing Tomorrow, Willem Twee Kunstruimte, 's-Hertogenbosch, Netherlands
- 2022 Universal Tongue, Melkweg Expo, Amsterdam, Netherlands
- 2022 Universal Tongue, part of WHOLE United Queer Festival, Orangerie, Ferropolis, Germany
- 2022 Universal Tongue, Museum Voorlinden, Wassenaar, Netherlands
- 2022 Niet Meer Normaal, Kunstkerk Dordrecht, Netherlands
- 2022 Universal Tongue, Museum Tinguely, Basel, Switzerland
- 2021 Perpetual Endless Flow, FuturDome, Milan, Italy
- 2021 Trans Human Nature, 254Forest, Brussels, Belgium
- 2021 Universal Tongue, Vooruit, Ghent, Belgium
- 2018 Transformagic, Association for Contemporary Culture Fotopub, Ljubljana, Slovenia
- 2017 ¡Aguas! Next Level, FOAM, Amsterdam, Netherlands
- 2017 Ego, Eco, Crescendo, French Pavilion, Organ Vida, Zagreb, Croatia
- 2017 Ahead, Centro de la Imagen, Mexico City, Mexico
- 2016 <Connection>, part of Offprint, Tate Modern, London, UK
- 2015 Sweaty Sculptures, Green Is Gold, Copenhagen, Denmark
- 2014 Paulien Oltheten & Anouk Kruithof, Stedelijk Museum, Amsterdam, Netherlands
- 2012 Ruhe, Autocenter, Berlin, Germany
- 2012 Untitled (I've Taken Too Many Photos / I've Never Taken a Photo), Tour des Templiers, Hyères, France
- 2009 Becoming Blue, Museum de Domijnen, Sittard, Netherlands
- 2009 Becoming Blue, Künstlerhaus Bethanien, Berlin, Germany
- 2006 The Black Hole (with Jaap Scheeren), FOAM, Amsterdam, Netherlands

Selected Group Exhibitions

- 2024 Grow It, Show It! A Look at Hair from Diane Arbus to TikTok, Museum Folkwang, Essen, Germany
- 2024 Tanzwelten, Bundeskunsthalle, Bonn, Germany
- 2024 Limburg Biënnale, Marres, Maastricht, Netherlands
- 2024 Art with Salt and Water (European Capital of Culture Bad Ischl), Sudhaus Bad Ischl, Austria
- 2023 Resilient Rebels, Museum Helmond, Netherlands
- 2023 Un Été Au Havre, Édition 23, Le Havre, France
- 2023 A Field Guide to Getting Lost, Het Nieuwe Domein, Sittard, Netherlands
- 2023 Just Dance, schrit_tmacher, Schunck Glass Palace, Heerlen, Netherlands
- 2022 Sightlines, SFMOMA, San Francisco, USA
- 2022 Night, Chroniques, Biennale of Digital Imagination at Friche la Belle de Mai, Marseille, France
- 2022 Tales of Togetherness, KIKK Festival, Namur, Belgium
- 2022 States of Disruption, Centre for Contemporary Photography, Fitzroy, Australia
- 2022 Refinery Monastery, 20th Pančevo Biennial, Pančevo, Serbia
- 2022 From Where I Stand, Biennale für Aktuelle Fotografie, Port 25, Mannheim, Germany
- 2022 Inside the Outside, Coda, Apeldoorn, Netherlands
- 2022 Folkwang and the City, Museum Folkwang, Essen, Germany
- 2021 Biennale NOVA_XX, Centre Wallonie Bruxelles, Paris, France
- 2021 Global Groove, Museum Folkwang, Essen, Germany
- 2021 Bye Bye His-Story, Chapter 5050, Centre de la Gravure et de l'Image Imprimée, La Louvière, Belgium
- 2021 À Fleur de Monde, Centre Photographique Rouen Normandie, Rouen, France
- 2021 One and One Is Three, Museum Voorlinden, Wassenaar, Netherlands
- 2021 Eregalerij van de Nederlandse Fotografie, Nederlands Fotomuseum, Rotterdam, Netherlands
- 2020 On Earth – Imaging, Technology and the Natural World, Le Lieu Unique, Nantes, France
- 2020 Nach Uns Die Sintflut (After Us, the Flood), Kunst Haus Wien, Vienna, Austria
- 2020 La Photographie à l'Épreuve de l'Abstraction, Centre Photographique d'Ile-de-France and Frac Normandie Rouen, Rouen, France
- 2020 On Earth – Imaging, Technology and the Natural World, FOAM, Amsterdam, Netherlands
- 2019 On Earth – Imaging, Technology and the Natural World, Les Forges I LUMA, Arles, France
- 2019 The Life of Things, MOMENTA | Biennale de l'Image, Montreal, Canada
- 2019 Trouble in Paradise, Collection Rattan Chadha, Kunsthal Rotterdam, Rotterdam, Netherlands
- 2018 Loading… Works from the FOAM Collection, FOAM, Amsterdam, Netherlands
- 2018 Beautiful Distress (part of ‘Zomergasten'), Museum Dr. Guislain, Ghent, Belgium
- 2017 Paperworks, Museo Tamayo, Mexico City, Mexico
- 2017 Façade, Middelburg, Netherlands
- 2016 Volkskrant Beeldende Kunst Prijs, Stedelijk Museum Schiedam, Schiedam, Netherlands
- 2015 Ocean of Images: New Photography 2015, MoMA, New York, USA
- 2014 L'art se Livre, MBAL, Le Locle, Switzerland
- 2013 Undercover, Erarta Museum, St Petersburg, Russia
- 2013 WIT, Nederlands Fotomuseum, Rotterdam, Netherlands
- 2013 Still/Life, Multimedia Art Museum, Moscow, Russia
- 2013 Papierkunst, Stedelijk Museum, Kampen, Netherlands
- 2013 The Feverish Library, Capitain Petzel Gallery, Berlin, Germany
- 2012 The Youth Code!, Daegu Photo Biennale, Daegu, South Korea
- 2011 Still/Life Contemporary Dutch Photography, FOAM, Amsterdam, Netherlands
- 2011 Crossroads, KIT, Düsseldorf, Germany
- 2010 Quickscan NL#1, Nederlands Fotomuseum, Rotterdam, Netherlands
- 2010 Holland Papier Biennale, CODA, Apeldoorn, Netherlands
- 2010 Quickscan NL#1, Dutch Culture Center, Shanghai, China
- 2008 Territoires, MAMAC, Liège, Belgium
- 2007 Dutch Dare: Contemporary Photography from the Netherlands, Erasmus Huis, Jakarta, Indonesia
- 2006 Dutch Dare: Contemporary Photography from the Netherlands, ACP, Sydney, Australia
- 2006 Fotodrukwerk, Stedelijk Museum, Amsterdam, Netherlands
- 2003 Retour Breda-Amsterdam-Den Haag, Museum de Beyerd, Breda, Netherlands

Awards

- 2021 Gallery of Honor of Dutch Photography, Nederlands Fotomuseum, Netherlands
- 2016 Volkskrant Beeldende Kunst Prijs (Public Prize), Netherlands
- 2015 Meijburg Art Commission Prize, Netherlands
- 2014 Charlotte Köhler Prize (Visual Art), Netherlands
- 2012 Paris Photo Aperture PhotoBook Award (A Head with Wings), France
- 2012 ICP Infinity Award (Young Photographer), USA
- 2012 Flash Forward Award / USA Magenta Foundation, USA
- 2011 Jury Grand Prize, Hyères Festival de Mode et Photographie, France
- 2011 Photoglobal Prize, Hyères Festival de Mode et Photographie, France
- 2011 ILLY Award (Public Prize), Art Rotterdam, Netherlands
- 2009 Honorable Mention, Plat(t)form 09, Fotomuseum Winterthur, Switzerland
- 2006 Honorable Mention, Rencontres Arles Book Award (The Black Hole), Netherlands
- 2005 Unique Photography Book Award (The Black Hole), Netherlands
- 2003 PANL 13 Student Award & Gold Award, Netherlands

Selected Collections

- SF MOMA, San Francisco, USA
- Aperture Foundation, New York, USA
- Carnegie Museum of Art, Pittsburgh, USA
- Museum Folkwang, Essen, Germany
- Fotomuseum, Winterthur, Switzerland
- MBAL, Le Locle, Switzerland
- Stedelijk Museum, Amsterdam, Netherlands
- Netherlands Photo Museum, Rotterdam, Netherlands
- FOAM, Amsterdam, Netherlands
- Museum Voorlinden, Wassenaar, Netherlands
- Centraal Museum, Utrecht, Netherlands
- Museum de Domijnen, Sittard, Netherlands
- Grimmuseum, Berlin, Germany
- Pier24 Photography Library, San Francisco, USA
- MoMA Library, New York, USA
- ICP Library, New York, USA.
