= Library of the Printed Web =

Physical archive

Printed Web
- Editor: Paul Soulellis
- Categories: Art, New media, Internet culture
- Frequency: Semi-annual
- Publisher: Library of the Printed Web
- First issue: 2014
- Country: United States
- Based in: New York City
- Language: English
- Website: Printed Web
- ISSN: 2332-6638

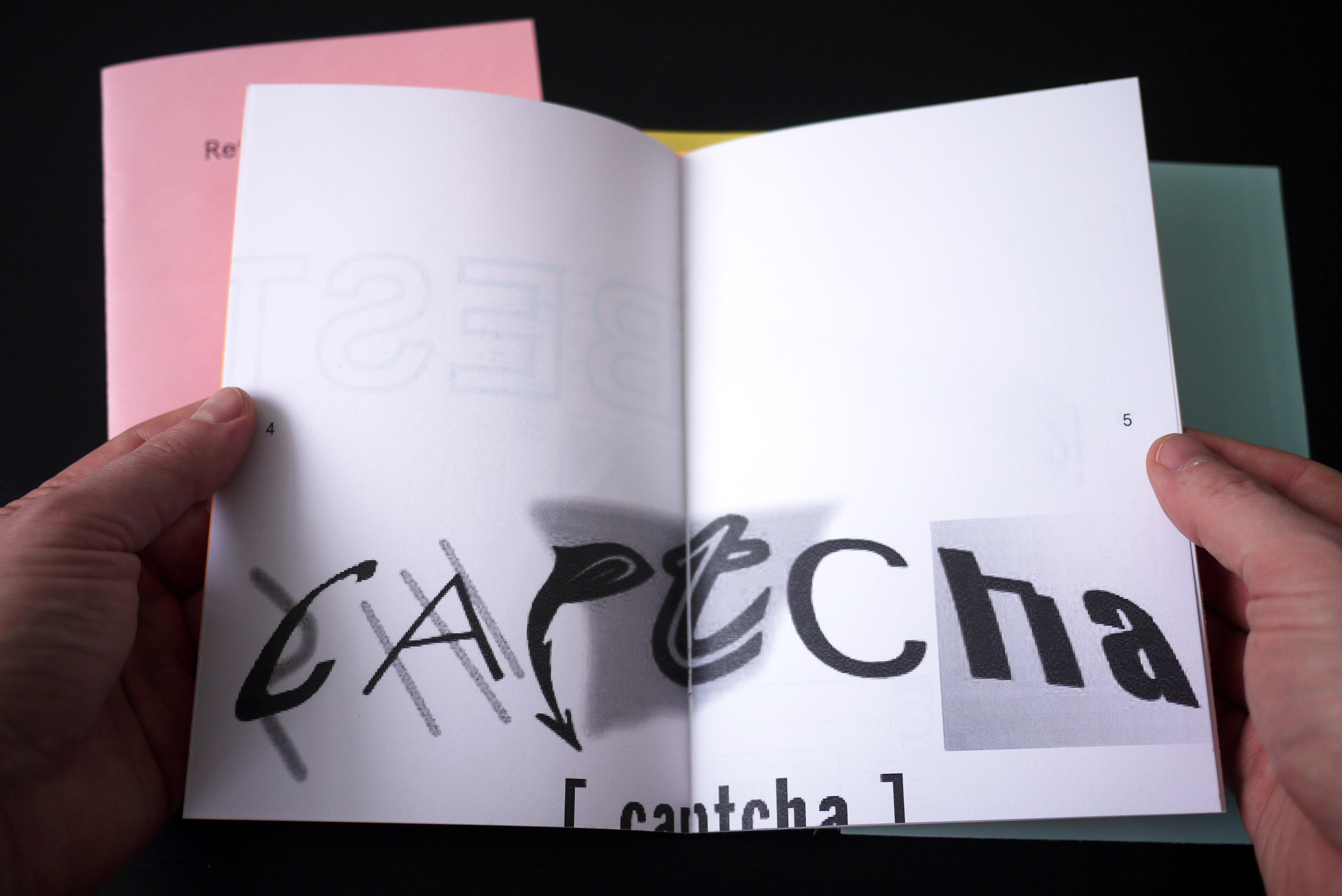
Captcha zine by Anonymous Press (Karolis Kosas) (2013), included in Library of the Printed Web.

Library of the Printed Web is a physical archive devoted to web-to-print artists’ books, zines and other printout matter. Founded by Paul Soulellis in 2013, the collection was acquired by The Museum of Modern Art Library in January 2017. The project has been described as "web culture articulated as printed artifact," an "archive of archives," characterized as an "accumulation of accumulations," much of it printed on demand. Techniques for appropriating web content used by artists in the collection include grabbing, hunting, scraping and performing, detailed by Soulellis in "Search, Compile, Publish," and later referenced by Alessandro Ludovico.

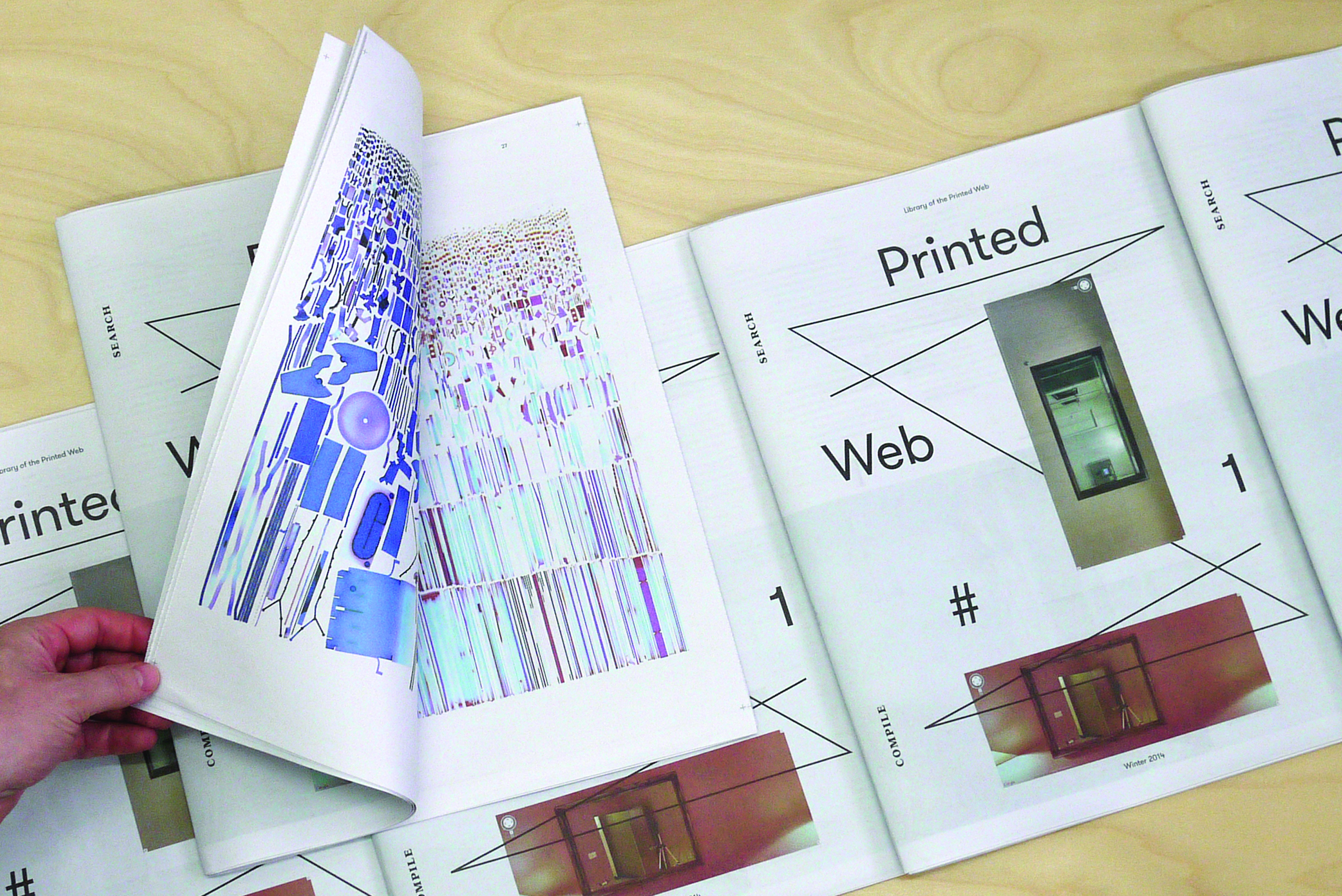
Printed Web 1, launched in January 2014, featured work by Joachim Schmid, Penelope Umbrico, Christian Bök, Clement Valla, Kenneth Goldsmith, Hito Steyerl, Benjamin Shaykin, Chris Alexander, Mishka Henner, David Horvitz and Ameramp Press.

Among the 130 artists included in Library of the Printed Web are Olia Lialina, Mishka Henner, Clement Valla, Karolis Kosas, Lauren Thorson, Cory Arcangel, Silvio Lorusso, Angela Genusa, Jean Keller, Aaron Krach, Joachim Schmid, Benjamin Shaykin, Chantal Zakari, Richard Prince, David Horvitz and Penelope Umbrico. Over 240 works are in the collection. Library of the Printed Web continues to grow through curatorial acquisition and artist contributions.

The collection is used primarily for experimental publishing research, as a way to question issues of copyright, privacy and appropriation by artists on the internet, and as the basis for academic workshops in design and new media.

The project is frequently featured at book fairs, independent publishing conferences and schools, appearing at Miss Read Berlin Art Book Fair, Stadtbibliothek Stuttgart, Merz Akademie, Printed Matter's NY Art Book Fair, Offprint London, Theorizing the Web, Interrupt 3 at Brown University, The Internet Yami-Ichi, Printed Matter's LA Art Book Fair, Odds and Ends Art Book Fair at Yale Art Gallery, Rhode Island School of Design School of Visual Arts, International Center of Photography, School of the Museum of Fine Arts Boston and Offprint Paris. In 2013 Library of the Printed Web was featured at Theorizing the Web and The Book Affair at the opening of the 55th Venice Biennale.

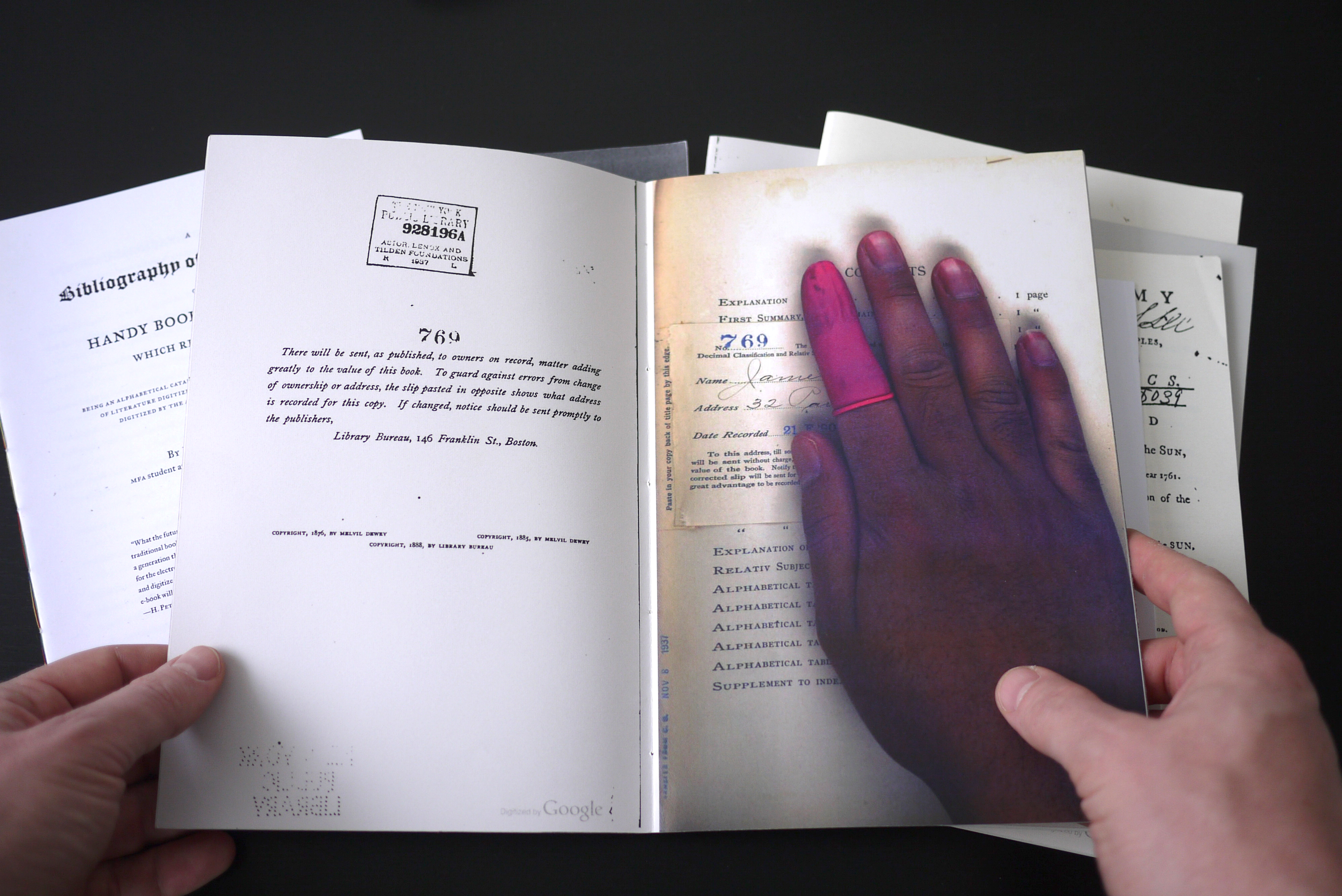
Special Collection by Benjamin Shaykin (2009), included in Library of the Printed Web.

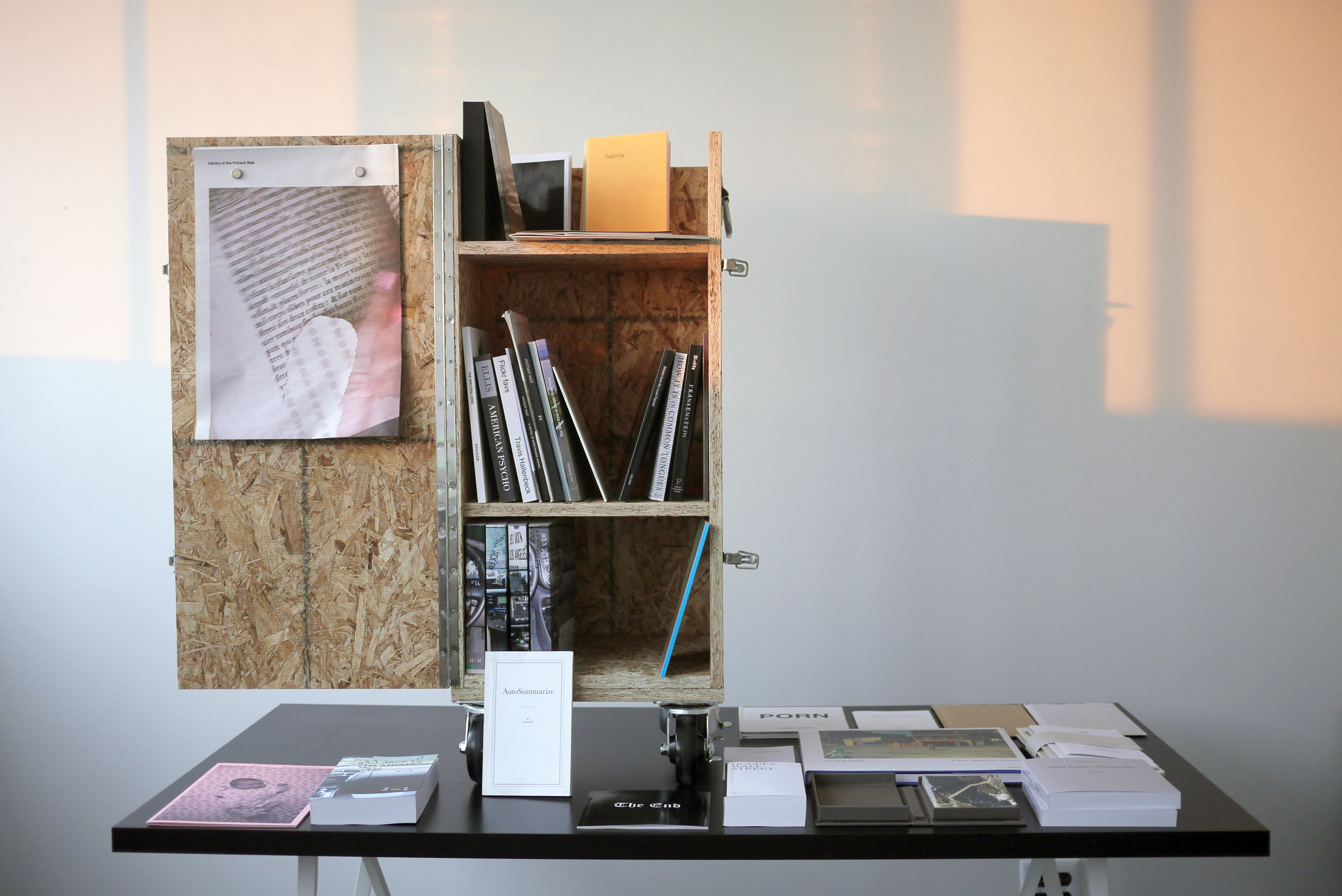
Library of the Printed Web, shown in February 2013. The collection was originally housed in a wooden box on wheels.

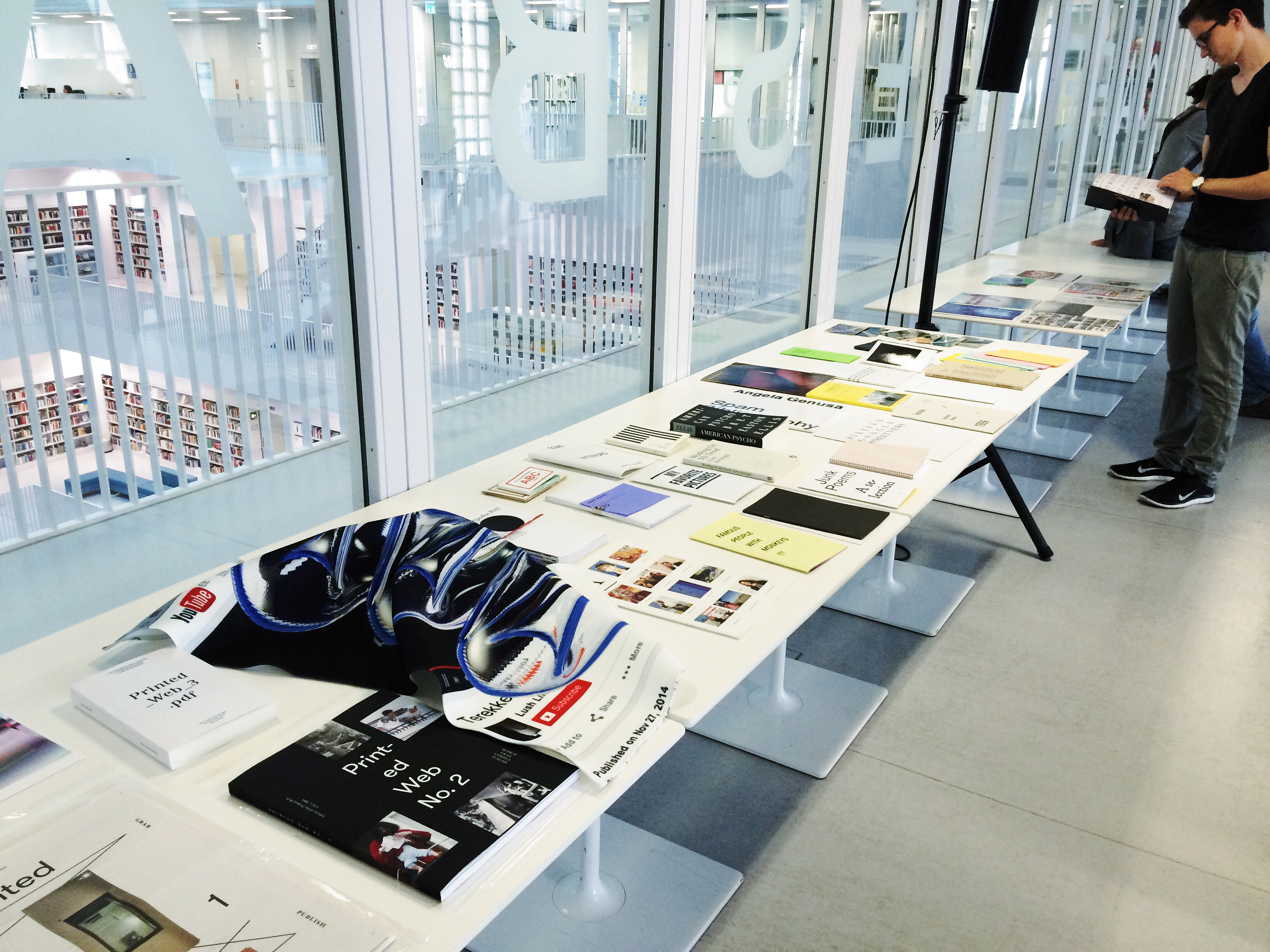
Selections from Library of the Printed Web shown at Stadtbibliothek Stuttgart in Stuttgart, Germany as part of the Digital Literacy, Digital Culture series in June 2015.

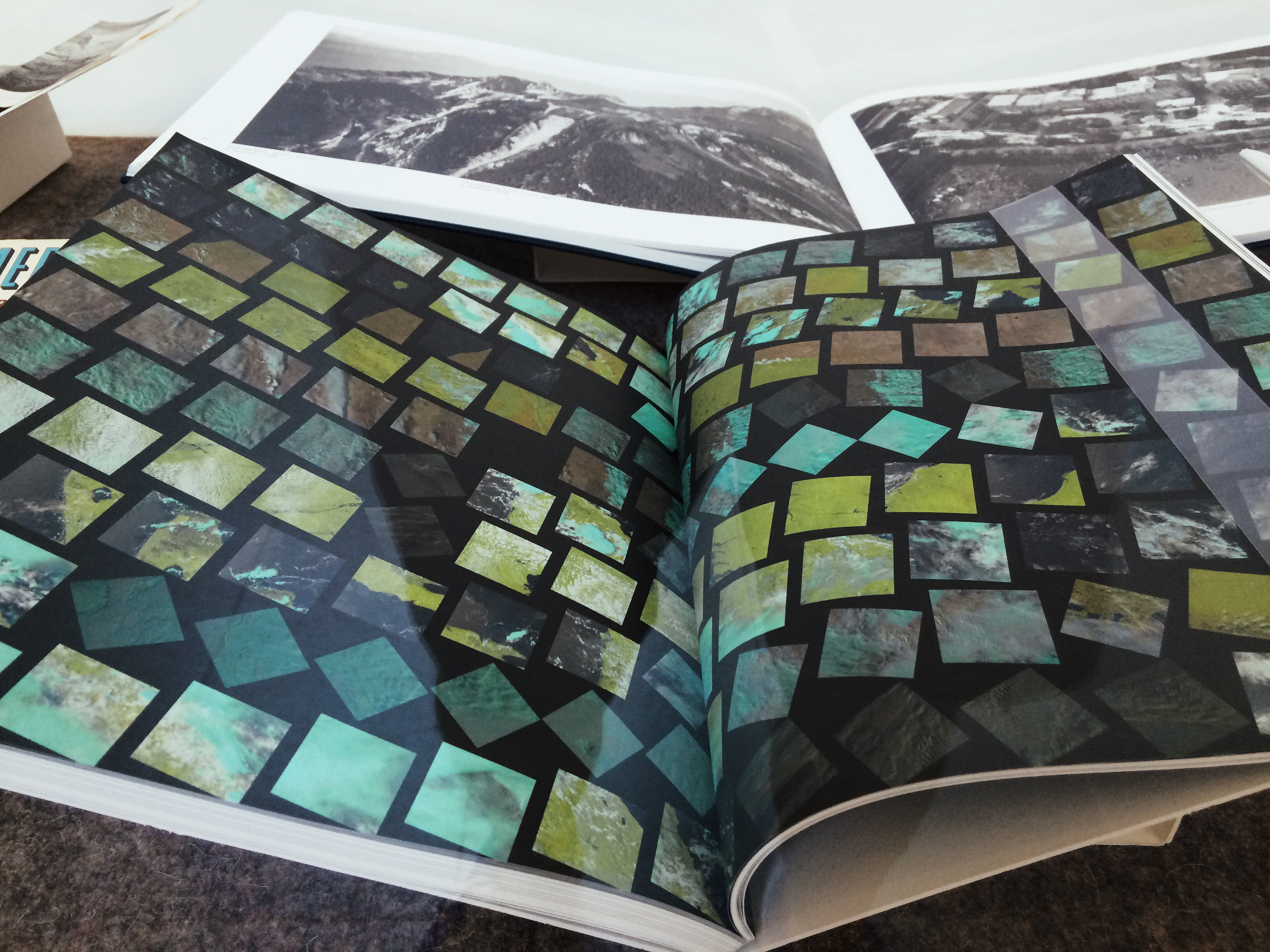
James Bridle's project laaaaaaandsat.tumblr.com featured in Printed Web 2, included in "Aerial Imagery in Print, 1860 to Today" at Museum of Modern Art, New York City (June 2016)

== Printed Web (publication) ==
Printed Web is an artists' publication devoted to web-to-print art and discourse, published by Paul Soulellis / Library of the Printed Web. The project began in 2014 as a way to present new work by artists included in Soulellis’ Library of the Printed Web. Artists are invited to submit new or existing network-based work for the printed page. In the spirit of Seth Siegelaub, each issue is curated as a group exhibition for the printed page. Printed Web circulates primarily as print-on-demand publications, but also includes PDFs, ZIPs, GIFs, and server directories. More than 180 artists and writers have contributed to the project through issue #4. Individual issues are widely held in special artists’ publications collections and libraries, including Museum of Modern Art NY, Yale University, San Francisco Museum of Modern Art, Walker Center, and NY Public Library.

Printed Web 2 was included in the exhibition "Aerial Imagery in Print, 1860 to Today" at Museum of Modern Art, organized by MoMA Library, featuring a project by James Bridle. Printed Web 3 was an open call and launched on the front page of Rhizome and at Offprint London in May 2015, featuring work by 147 artists. Printed Web 4 was a co-publication with International Center of Photography and featured in the exhibition "Public, Private, Secret," curated by Charlotte Cotton in June 2016. The text "Folding the Web" by Michael Connor, artistic director of Rhizome, was included in Printed Web 4.

Printed Web 5: Bot Anthologia features algorithmic media: bots, feeds, streams, and other autonomous projects. It was presented at Eyebeam and Interrupt 4 at Brown University.

== Artists included in Printed Web publications ==
=== Printed Web 1 (January 2014) ===
- Joachim Schmid
- Penelope Umbrico
- Christian Bök
- Clement Valla
- Jason Huff
- Mimi Cabell
- Kenneth Goldsmith
- Hito Steyerl
- Benjamin Shaykin
- Christopher Alexander
- Mishka Henner
- David Horvitz
- Amperamp Press

=== Printed Web 2 (December 2014) ===
- Constant Dullaart
- Daniel Temkin
- James Bridle
- John Zissovici
- Cheryl Sourkes
- Brian Droitcour
- Tan Lin
- Angela Genusa
- Webdriver Torso
- Rafaël Rozendaal
- Olia Lialina
- Cory Arcangel

=== Printed Web 3 (May 2015) ===
- Open call: 147 artists (full list)
- Silvio Lorusso

=== Printed Web 4: Public, Private, Secret (June 2016) ===
- Wolfgang Plöger
- Lorna Mills
- Molly Soda
- Travess Smalley
- Angela Genusa
- Eva and Franco Mattes
- Anouk Kruithof
- Elisabeth Tonnard
- Christopher Clary
- Michael Connor

=== Printed Web 5: Bot Anthologia (March 2017) ===
Included 30+ artists who make bots, feeds, streams, and other autonomous projects.

- Ian Cheng
- Jason Ronallo
- Anders Hoff
- Brent Watanabe
- John Emerson
- Allison Parrish
- Mario Klingemann
- Colin Mitchell
- Chris Novello
- Matthew Plummer-Fernandez and Julien Deswaef
- John Cayley
- Matthew Thomas
- Joana Moll
- Darius Kazemi
- David Lublin
- Bob Poekert
- Ash Wolf
- Sean S. LeBlanc
- Eugenio Tisselli V.
- Gregor Weichbrodt
- Everest Pipkin & Loren Schmidt
- Derek Arnold
