= This is a Picture of Wind =

Electronic literature project by J.R. Carpenter

- Author: J.R. Carpenter
- Language: English
- Genre: Electronic literature
- Published: 2018
- Publisher: IOTA Institute
- Publication place: United Kingdom
- Media type: HTML5, CSS, PHP, and JavaScript

This is a Picture of Wind is an electronic literature project created by UK-based artist, writer, performer, and researcher J.R. Carpenter. This is a multimodal project, consisting of a web app, a zine, and a print poetry collection. The project, written in the form of HTML5, CSS, PHP and JavaScript, is a collection of short-written poems that explores the innovative use of multimedia elements and the intersection between literature and technology. J.R. Carpenter first published this work on her digital platform in 2018 with a print book published in 2020. The work has since gained recognition in the field of electronic literature.

== Origins and influences ==
This is a Picture of Wind is Carpenter's response to the 2013-14 United Kingdom winter floods that ravaged the South West of England. These floodings left a trail of destruction in Somerset, Devon, Dorset, and Cornwall with severe damage to local infrastructure.

Describing this work as "a weather poem for phones", Carpenter transforms weather reports into poetic stanzas with interchangeable vocabulary, a constantly reworking collection of anecdotes that change at specific intervals to depict wind conditions throughout the calendar year. The purpose is to alter and reshape the conception of natural phenomena.

== Plot ==
This is a Picture of Wind features descriptions of weather from diary entries intertwined with live reports of weather data of the area. J.R. Carpenter invites readers into the role of authorship within a world defined by elusive natural forces. Carpenter combines the processes of presentation and interpretation by utilizing a web-based medium to decipher the vast uncertainty and interchangeability of nature. The poetic nature of This is a Picture of Wind places the author's creative role in the background, allowing the intricate interplay of phenomenal reports, shifting anecdotes, and the complex process of reader interpretation to take center stage. The author challenges readers to reconfigure their perception of nature, emphasizing that it is neither predictable nor anthropocentric, but rather a recalcitrant force responding to Anthropocene production. Her expertise lies in replicating the variable forces of the wind and transforming them into a calendar-based weather report, which functions as seamlessly as a casual conversation.

=== Story structure and navigation ===
The calendar design in This is a Picture of Wind incorporates a horizontal scrolling structure with poetic stanzas that observe wind conditions and the surrounding environment each week of the 12 months. The dynamic blue text mirrors the ever-changing and turbulent nature of the wind. Every digital component within this artwork, including the coding, color palette, and stanza structure, meticulously mirrors the wind's distinctive attributes. While the narrative occurs in 2014, the work's thematic relevance transcends temporal boundaries. The real-time weather updates imbue readers with a profound sense of immediacy.

== Publication history ==
The IOTA Institute, with generous sponsorship from the Canada Council for the Arts, introduced This is a Picture of Wind as one of the commissioned web-based projects in 2017. The web-based app was within the framework of IOTA:DATA along the production of a digital research publication investigating the domains of web-based art communities, digital aesthetics, and the multifaceted histories of Net Art.

A print book iteration was published by Longbarrow Press in Sheffield in June 2020. The Digital Storytelling exhibit at the British Library in London showcased the project from June to October 2023.

== Genre ==
Carpenter designed the project for mobile users, but it also works on computers and tablets. This is a Picture of Wind is an example of generative literature that explores the interplay between quantitative weather reports, traced maps, and the poetic relationships between human and nonhuman authorship.

The printed version provides a distinct version from its web-based original, as it transforms into half a weather diary, and half a guidebook detailing the unpredictable natural disaster. The book offers a diverse vocabulary to depict the transmutable characteristics of nonhuman phenomena.

== Literary significance and critical reception ==
This is a Picture of Wind has received recognition as the winner of the Dot Award for Digital Literature and the People's Choice Award in the Opening Up Digital Fiction Competition in 2018. The work was also shortlisted for the Robert Coover Award for a Work of Electronic Literature and the New Media Writing Prize in the same year.

This work was exhibited at the British Library in 2023.

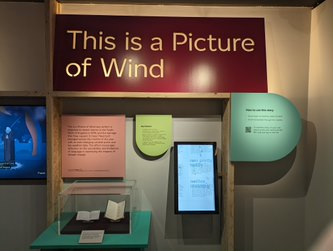
This is a Picture of Wind by J.R. Carpenter, exhibit at the British Library 2023

=== Awards ===
The digital version of This is A Picture of Wind won the Dot Award for Digital Literature in 2018 and Opening Up Digital Fiction Competition People's Choice Award in 2018. It was also shortlisted for the Robert Coover Award for a Work of Electronic Literature (2018) and the 2018 New Media Writing Prize

The print version of This is A Picture of Wind was a Guardian's Best poetry books of 2020 and was longlisted for the Laurel Prize in 2021.
