= J. R. Carpenter =

UK-based Canadian-born artist and writer

- Born: 1972 (age 53–54); Nova Scotia, Canada
- Education: Concordia University; University of the Arts London
- Occupations: Artist, writer, researcher
- Awards: New Media Writing Prize (2016)

J. R. Carpenter (born 1972) is a British-Canadian artist, writer, and researcher working across performance, print, and digital media. She was born in Nova Scotia in 1972. She lived in Montreal from 1990 to 2009. She emigrated to England in 2010 and became a British citizen in 2019. She now lives in Southampton, England.

== Education ==
Carpenter studied Life Drawing and Anatomy at the Art Students League of New York in 1988. She graduated with a BFA in Studio Art, with a concentration in Fibres and Sculpture from Concordia University in Montreal in 1995. In 2015, she was awarded a practice-led PhD research degree from University of the Arts London in association with Falmouth University. Her thesis, Writing Coastlines: Locating Narrative Resonance in Transatlantic Communications Networks "contributed to the creation of a new narrative context from which to examine a multi-site-specific place-based identity by extending the performance writing methodology to incorporate digital literature and locative narrative practices, by producing and publicly presenting a significant body of creative and critical work, and by developing a mode of critical writing which intertwines practice with theory."

== Professional life ==
Carpenter has worked across visual, media, and literary arts, with public-facing and academic institutions. She was President of the Board of Directors of OBORO, an artist-run gallery and new media lab in Montreal, from 2006 to 2011. She was a faculty mentor for Performance Writing and Electronic literature on the In (ter)ventions: Literary Practice at the Edge program at The Banff Centre from 2010 to 2014. In 2015, she was awarded a Visiting Fellowship at the Eccles Centre for American Studies at the British Library, London, UK. In 2019, she was awarded a Visiting Fellowship at the Moore Institute for Research in the Humanities and Social Studies at NUIG Galway, Ireland. She was Writer in Residence in the Department of English and Film Studies at the University of Alberta 2020–2021, and Writer in Residence for the StreeLife project at University of York 2022. In June 2022, she began a two-year postdoctoral Research Fellowship, working the AHRC & DFG funded, interdisciplinary research project, Weather Reports – Wind as Model, Media, and Experience at Winchester School of Art.

== Writing ==
Carpenter has written critically about place and displacement, textile art, media art, digital literature and internet history. Her print essays, art reviews, poetry and short fiction have been broadcast on CBC Radio, translated into French, Italian, and Spanish, and published in numerous anthologies and journals across Canada, the US, the UK, Spain and Italy, including Oxford Poetry, 3:AM Magazine, PRISM International, Arc Poetry Magazine, Fuse, The New Quarterly, Geist, and The Capilano Review.

=== Digital writing ===
Carpenter has been writing electronic texts since 1993. Her work combines performance, print, and digital media. She made her first web-based work for Netscape 1.1. in 1995. Since that time her pioneering works of Electronic literature have been published, performed, and presented in festivals, galleries and museums around the world, including: Montreal Museum of Fine Arts, Dare-Dare, OBORO (Art Centre) and Ada X (Studio), formerly known as StudioXX, in Montreal; Images Festival and Museum of Contemporary Canadian Art in Toronto; Arnolfini in Bristol; Palazzo delle arti Napoli in Naples; Machfeld Studio in Vienna; The Web Biennial in Istanbul; Open Space, San Francisco Museum of Modern Art in San Francisco; and Bibliothèque nationale de France and Le Cube in Paris.

- Carpenter's In Absentia uses a google map of Montreal to show how much of our lives can not be said or integrated into maps.
- Carpenter's The Broadside of a Yarn was commissioned by Electronic Literature as a Model for Creativity in Practice (ELMCIP) for Remediating the Social, an exhibition which took place at Inspace, Edinburgh, UK, November 1–17, 2012. She discusses this work in Narrabase.
- Carpenter's Notes on the Voyage of Owl and Girl, 2012 was reviewed in I Love Epoetry and Carpenter wrote an essay on this work in #WomenTechLit
- A retrospective of her web-based work was presented at Electrifying Literature: Affordances and Constraints an exhibition held in conjunction with the Electronic Literature Organization Conference 2012 in Morgantown, West Virginia.
- She created a series of short fictions generated by Python scripts, including Excerpts from the Chronicles of Pookie and JR, as described in Narrabase.
- Her web-based work, The Gathering Cloud was commissioned by NEoN Digital Arts Festival 2016, Dundee, UK. Natalie Pollard has published a close reading of The Gathering Cloud, and explains that this work lists Tung-Hui Hu's The Prehistory of the Cloud as a key source. Pollard analyzes the electronic literature elements of this work through the "layering and sedimenting of textual ang graphic sources" as a different perspective on cloud computing.
- Her web-app, This is a Picture of Wind a weather phone for phones, was commissioned by the Iota Institute in Canada, with the support of a grant from the Canada Council for the Arts. The print version of This is a Picture of Wind was published as a book in the Sheffield: Longbarrow Press in June 2020.
- Her soundwork and web app, An Island of Sound, was exhibited at the British Library Mix Conference in 2023.

Her digital work is also included in The Rhizome ArtBase, the Electronic Literature Collection Volumes One, Two, Three, and Four, and the ELMCIP Anthology of European Electronic Literature.

=== Books ===
Carpenter's first novel, Words the Dog Knows, was published by Conundrum Press in Montreal in 2008.

Her second book, GENERATION[S], a collection of code narratives, was published in Vienna by Traumawien in 2010.

In 2017, a print book based on her web-based work, The Gathering Cloud, was published in Axminster by Uniformbooks, featuring a foreword by Jussi Parikka and an afterword by Lisa Robertson. The Belgian critic Jan Baetens situates The Gathering Cloud alongside Christian Bök's Crystallography, stating: "it is part of a newly emerging canon of art and science creations that help reshape the fundamental unity of the humanities." Writing for the Italian journal Neural, Aurelio Cianciotta concurs: "…this book represents the kind of rewarding hybridity in writing and concepts that we'd expect much more often in contemporaneity." Writing for Sabotage Reviews, Ryan Ormonde states: "By gathering together histories and theories on the 'cloud' in all its duality, and, in the process, dissolving that duality, Carpenter founds a whole new discipline. If Cloud Studies takes off, here is its primer."

In 2018, Carpenter's debut poetry collection, An Ocean of Static, was published in London by Penned in the Margins. Writing for Poetry London, Katie Evans-Bush describes An Ocean of Static as "a bravura piece of writing… a bit intimidating next to your average poetry collection.." Writing for The Poetry School, Jade Cuttle calls An Ocean of Static "a poetic endeavour completely unlike any other." Writing for Department of Feminist Conversations, Mary Paterson states: "Carpenter doesn't just take risks; she breaks things apart and creates them anew. Her poems' refusal to settle into one meaning undermines the truth-ambitions of language — shattering language into a multitude of possibilities — and lays bare the principles that make these ambitions persist."

In 2020, her second poetry collection, This is a Picture of Wind, was published by Longbarrow Press, featuring a foreword by Johanna Drucker and an afterword by Vahni Capildeo. This collection explores the paradox presented by our attempts to evoke through the materiality of language a force such as wind which we can only perceive indirectly through its effect. This is a Picture of Wind was listed in The Guardian's Best Poetry Books of 2020. Writing for The Guardian, Rishi Dastidar describes This is a Picture of Wind as "title that gives shape to the ineffable." Writing for Spam Press, Alison Scott observes: "This language, always grappling with inadequacy, by abundance and concentration is forced to its visible edges, stretched, blown open – forming what Johanna Drucker calls in Carpenter's work 'a thick adjectival field of terms'."

Carpenter's fourth collection, Measures of Weather, was published by Shearman Books in 2025, and was called a "blustery yet brilliant fourth collection" by The Guardian's reviewer, who praised its "clever use of concrete poetry".

== Awards ==
In 2003, Carpenter won the CBC Quebec Short Story Competition (now known as the Quebec Writing Competition) for her short story "Precipice", which was later anthologized in Short Stuff: New English Writing From Quebec. She won the CBC Quebec Short Story Competition again in 2005 for her short story "Air Holes", which was later anthologized in In Other Words: New English Writing From Quebec.

In 2008, she won the Quebec Writers' Federation Carte Blanche Award for "Wyoming is Haunted", a work of creative nonfiction.

In 2009, she won the Expozine Alternative Press Award for Best English Book for her novel, Words the Dog Knows. and was named a Montreal Mirror Noisemaker.

In 2012, her web-based work CityFish was shortlisted for the New Media Writing Prize. In 2015, she won the Dot Award for Digital Literature from if:book UK.

She won the New Media Writing Prize 2016 for her web-based work The Gathering Cloud. The Gathering Cloud was an Editor's Pick in the Wildcard Category in the Saboteur Awards 2017 and was shortlisted for the Robert Coover Award for a Work of Electronic Literature 2017 and The Turn On Literature Prize 2017.

In 2018, her web-app This is a Picture of Wind won the Opening Up Digital Fiction Competition's People's Choice Award and was shortlisted for the New Media Writing Prize 2018 and the Robert Coover Award for a Work of Electronic Literature 2018.

Her debut poetry collection An Ocean of Static was Highly Commended for the Forward Prizes for Poetry 2018.

Her second collection This is a Picture of Wind was longlisted for the Laurel Prize for Environmental Poetry 2021.

== Selected bibliography ==
=== Books ===
- Words the Dog Knows (Montreal: Conundrum Press 2008)
- GENERATION(S) (Vienna: Traumawien 2010)
- The Gathering Cloud (Uniformbooks 2017)
- An Ocean of Static (London: Penned in the Margins 2018)
- This is a Picture of Wind (Sheffield: Longbarrow Press 2020)

=== Web-based works ===
- Fishes & Flying Things (1995)
- Mythologies of Landforms and Little Girls (1996)
- (a grammar of signs has replaced a botany of symptoms) (1998)
- How I Loved the Broken Things of Rome (2005)
- The Cape (2005)
- Entre Ville (2006)
- in absentia (2008)
- CityFish (2010)
- Along the Briny Beach (2011)
- TRANS.MISSION [A.DIALOGUE] (2011)
- Notes on the Voyage of Owl and Girl (2012)
- There he was, gone. (2012)
- ...and by islands I mean paragraphs (2013)
- Etheric Ocean (2014)
- Notes Very Necessary co-authored with Barbara Bridger (2015)
- The Gathering Cloud (2016)
- This is a Picture of Wind: A Weather Poem for Phones (2018)
- The Pleasure of the Coast: A Hydro-graphic Novel (2019)

== See also ==
- List of electronic literature authors, critics, and works
- Internet art
- Digital poetry
- Electronic literature
- Hypertext fiction
- Interactive fiction
- Literatronica
