= An Island of Sound =

An Island of Sound is a piece of digital storytelling created by J.R. Carpenter that combines generative text and sound, images, spoken word, as well as live voice effects to explore and deconstruct the idea of phantom islands. This has been described as "A live performance and sound experience exploring phantom islands as weather phenomenon by J. R. Carpenter and Jules Rawlinson."

== Origins and influences ==
J.R. Carpenter's inspiration for An Island of Sound came from the tales told throughout history that "try to make sense of wind." The description of this work points to legends of mythical creatures such as sirens and sprites causing storms.

Carpenter was inspired by her research of phantom islands in the North Atlantic and was interested in the “distant” and “unknown.” Growing up in Canada, Carpenter encountered a lot of myth making in her youth surrounding explorers and discoveries. Carpenter stated that she wants to deconstruct these myths rooted in colonialism by using the “materials against themselves.”

== Publication history ==
A live performance of An Island of Sound was held December 2022 for the Edinburgh Futures Institute. Carpenter was accompanied by sound designer Jules Rawlinson for this performance. A second performance of this work was on July 7, 2023, as part of the British Library's exhibitions as part of the MIX 2023 conference held at the British Library.

== Plot ==
An Island of Sound combines images, generative text and sound, and spoken word. The images are selected from the archives of the British Library. The text and sound are carefully selected and then generated in a random order. The sound environment combines field recordings from the BBC sound effects library, wind synthesis, and live voice alteration by Jules Rawlinson. The generated text is selected from colonial era books. Due to the generative nature of the text and sound, Rawlinson has stated how the story, "doesn't always occur in the same way” and that it generates something “new” each time.

== Genre ==
This is a hypertext merged with a live performance work.

== Events ==
This work was exhibited in events on December 2, 2022, at the Edinburgh Candlelight Concerts and July 7, 2003, at the Mix Conference 2023 at the British Library.
