= Traumawien =

Austrian publishing house

- Status: Dissolved
- Founded: 2010
- Defunct: 2016
- Distribution: Worldwide
- Publication types: Products
- Official website: traumawien.net

Traumawien was an independent publishing house for conceptual digital literature founded in 2010 and dissolved in 2016.

== Print Publications ==
Traumawien displayed print books of conceptual writers and artists such as Audun Mortensen, J.R. Carpenter, Mez Breeze and Oswald Wiener and published, among others, Mimi Cabell and Jason Huff's American Psycho, an experimental reworking of the classic American Psycho, which was exhibited at the Galerie nationale du Jeu de Paume in 2012.

== Ghostwriters ==
In 2012 Traumawien completed their initial publication series with the e-book system 'Ghostwriters' on copyright and user exploitation. It was programmed by Bernhard Bauch, Berlin.

== Artclub ==
From 2013 to 2015 the publisher's event 'Artclub Rave Lecture' – a working synthesis of industrial techno and literary reading/lecture, dubbed by Deutschlandfunk as 'the most radical performance' at Europe's largest event for young literature Prosanova – became a Vienna club scene check-point.

== Post-Digital Products ==
In 2014 Traumawien created an ongoing series of post-digital products from Zazzle, an online merchandise print on demand service, customized with content appropriated from various social media. The prefix 'Post' was not be understood in the context of Post-Histoire or Post-Modernism but rather in the sense of Post-Punk. So therefore the continuation of a culture - the digital culture which manifests in the analog domain, the physical world. Also in 2014, a manifesto in "Manifeste für eine Literatur der Zukunft" with Neue Rundschau/S. Fischer Verlag/Frankfurt was released.

== The Post-Art Poets ==
The Post-Art Poets was a group of conceptual poets active between 2013 and 2014 (known members include Vanessa Place, Danny Snelson, and Luc Gross of Traumawien). Three works are available as print-on-demand via Blurb. Other publications include Last Poets: A 9,999 page poem by The Poets Against Poetry (PDF), the conceptual anthology Fungible Poetics Inc. concerned with shared ownership and market logics (PDF), and 32 Words. An Anthology of Post-Art Anti-Poetics, whose imprint states “Appropriation, plagiarism, and counterpublishing are encouraged.” It is sold for $160.

In 2014, the Post-Art Poets announced the end of their group on Twitter: “WE HAVE DISAPPEARED / TO BEGIN PREPARATIONS / FOR OUR REAPPEARANCE…”

== Final year ==
Meme Products were presented at 21erHaus Vienna Summer 2016.

The publisher cites conceptual writer Vanessa Place as a crucial influence. Traumawien dissolved in 2016.

== Print publications 2010-2014 ==
- Aust Götz von "Facorismen zur Lebenserbärmlichkeit" Vienna, 2012
- Mez Breeze "Human Readable Messages" Vienna, 2011
- J.R. Carpenter "Generation(s)" Vienna, 2012
- Hautmann Philip "Yorick" Vienna, 2010
- Hinke Margit "Shocking Blue Demon Lover" Vienna, 2010
- Huff Jason, Cabell Mimi "American Psycho" New York, Vienna, 2012
- Kaiser Olivia "La Bas" Vienna, 2013
- Laroche Brian "I™", Vienna, 2011
- Moosgaard Peter "Turbogott" Vienna, 2010
- Mortensen Audun Surf's Up 2010 Vienna, 2010
- Nausner Ulrich "OCR (deconstruction)" Vienna, 2013
- Palacz Julian "End Tell" Vienna, 2010
- Russeger Georg "Replik" Vienna, 2012
- Seipenbusch Anna "Never Catch Bombs" 2014
- Ubermorgen.com "AAbA LOGFILE" Vienna, 2012
- Vlaschits Marianne, Kunkel Martin "Das sinnliche Telefon" Vienna, 2010
- Wiener Oswald "Die Verbesserung von Mitteleuropa, Roman" Vienna, 2013
