= Silvio Lorusso =

Italian writer and artist

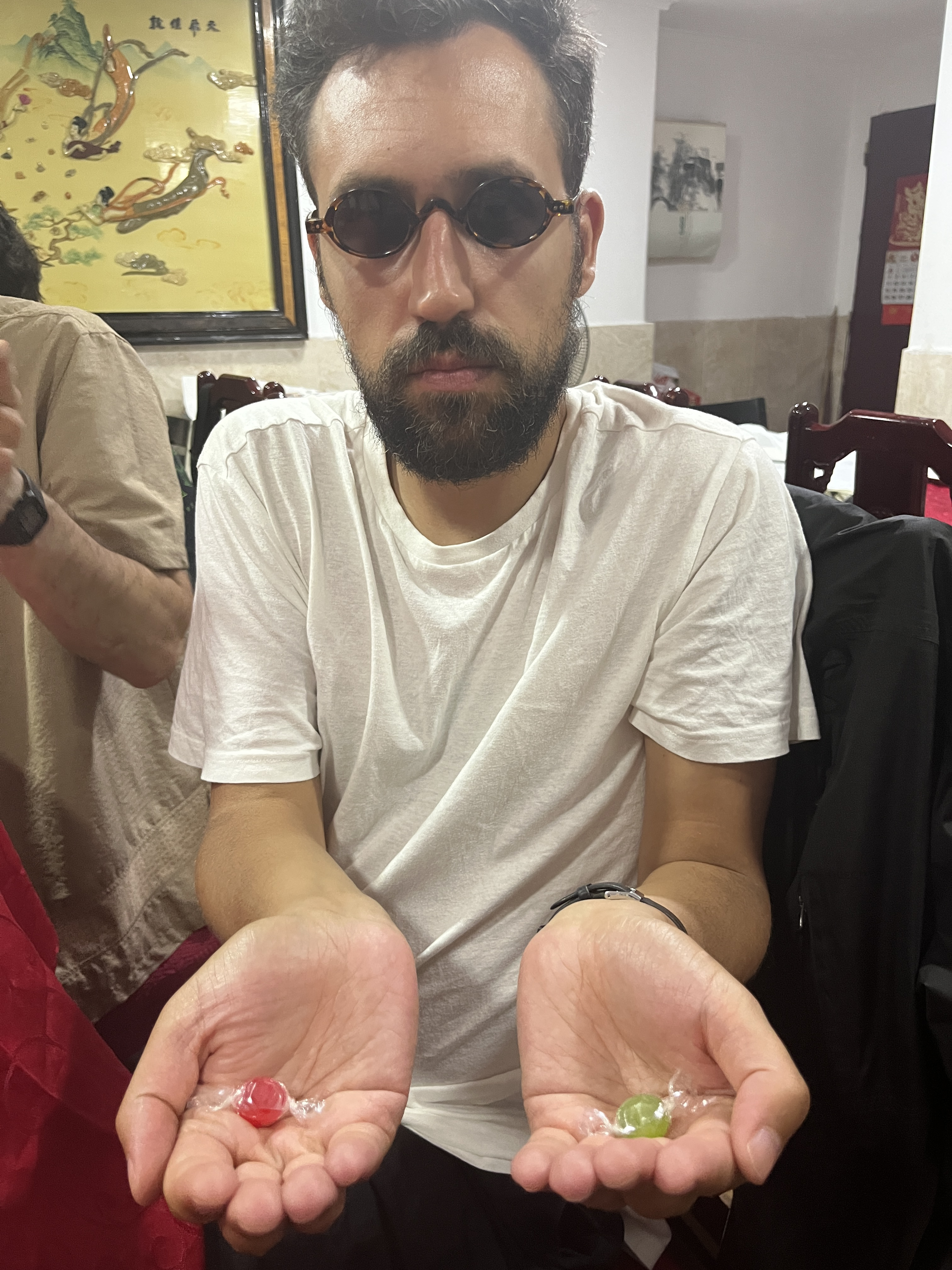
- Born: 1985 (age 40–41); Altamura, Italy
- Education: IUAV University of Venice and Politecnico di Bari
- Known for: Contemporary Art, Design, Non-fiction Writing
- Style: Conceptual artist
- Website: silviolorusso.com

Silvio Lorusso (born 1985) is an Italian writer, artist, and designer. His work critically examines design culture, technology, digital platforms, and labor. He is the author of Entreprecariat (2019), a book on entrepreneurialism and precarious labor, and What Design Can’t Do (2023), which explores the limitations of the design profession. What Design Can’t Do was nominated among the best design books of 2023 by Fast Company and The Architect's Newspaper.

== Biography ==
Lorusso earned a Ph.D. in Design Sciences from Iuav University of Venice and serves as an assistant professor at Universidade Lusófona.

== Work ==
Lorusso's artistic and research practice includes projects such as Kickended and Shouldn't You Be Working?, which comment on digital culture and productivity. Lorusso also created the Post-Digital Publishing Archive, an online archive focused on works of experimental publishing informed by digital technology.

== Books ==
- Lorusso, Silvio (2019). Entreprecariat: Everyone is an Entrepreneur, Nobody is Safe. Eindhoven, NL: Onomatopee. ISBN 9789493148161. OCLC 1129258681. Paperback edition. Foreword by Geert Lovink. Afterword by Raffaele Alberto Ventura.
- Lorusso, Silvio (2023). What Design Can't Do: Essays on Design and Disillusion. Eindhoven, NL: SetMargins'. ISBN 9789083350134. OCLC 1410442586. Paperback edition.
