= Penelope Umbrico =

American artist (born 1957)

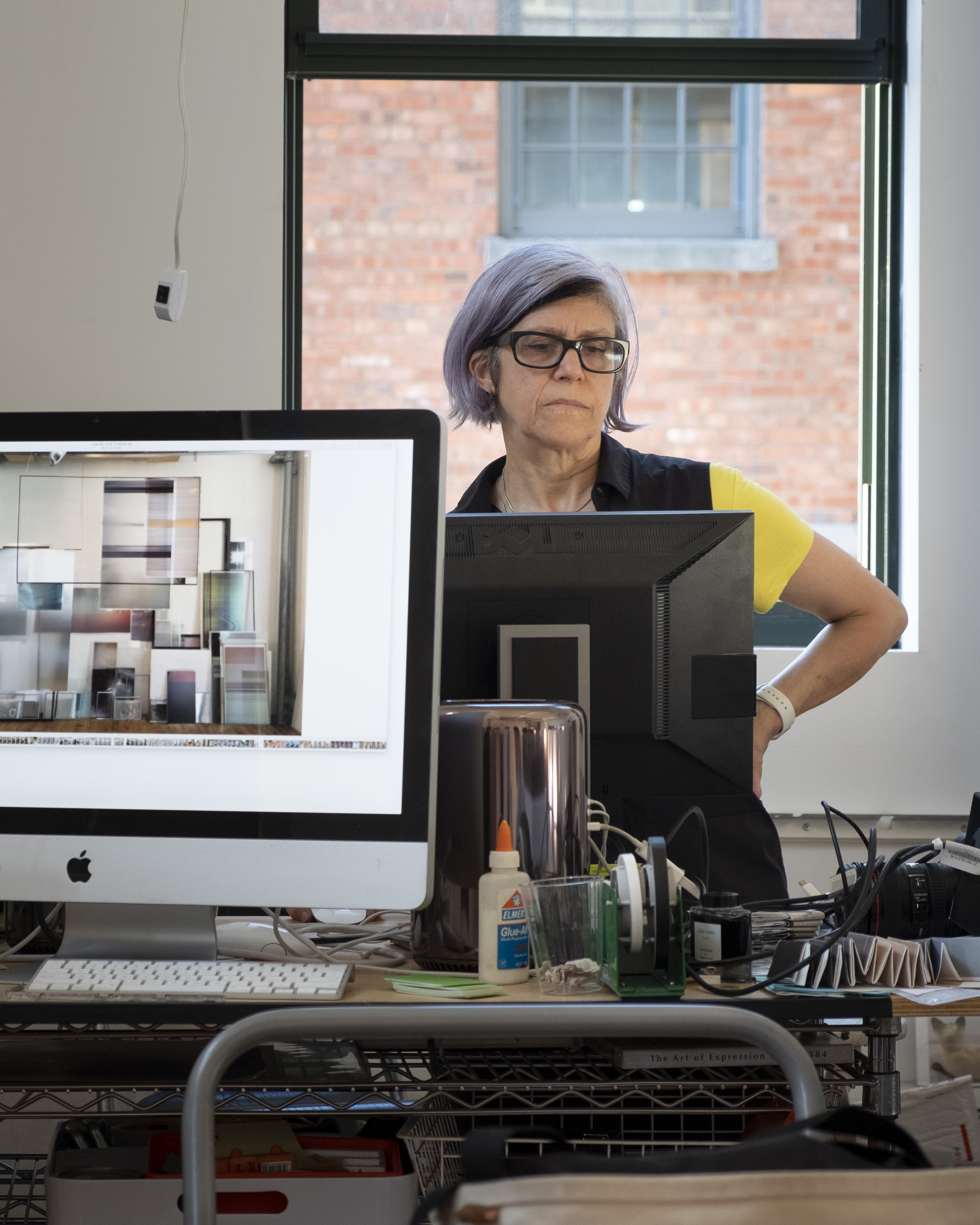
- Born: January 31, 1957 (age 69)
- Education: Ontario College of Art, School of Visual Arts
- Movement: Appropriation art

Penelope Umbrico (born January 31, 1957) is an American artist best known for her work that appropriates images found using search engines and picture sharing websites.

== Education and career ==
Suns from Flickr installation by Umbrico at New York Photo Festival, New York, 2008

Umbrico was born in Philadelphia in 1957. She graduated from the Ontario College of Art in Toronto, Canada in 1980. She obtained her M.F.A. in 1989 at the School of Visual Arts in New York.

== Exhibitions ==
In 2010 her exhibition, As Is, at LMAK Projects featured a series of work called Broken Sets (EBay) (2009–2010), which consisted of images of broken LCD television screens that were acquired from pictures posted by eBay sellers trying to sell damaged television sets for parts.

Her project Suns from Flickr started in 2006 when she found 541,795 pictures of sunsets searching the word "sunset" on the photo-sharing web site Flickr while looking for the most photographed subject (which the sunset turned out to be). She took just the suns from these pictures and made Kodak snapshot prints of them.

For each installation, the title reflects the number of hits she gets searching "sunset" on Flickr at the time – for example, the first installation was "541,795 Suns From Flickr" in 2006; subsequent installations were: "2303057 Suns From Flickr (Partial) 9/25/07" (2007); "3,221,717 Suns From Flickr (Partial) 3/31/08" (2008); "5,911,253 Suns From Flickr (Partial) 8/03/09" (2009) – the title itself becoming a comment on the ever-increasing use of web-based photo communities and a reflection of the collective content there.

Her work has been published in the New York Times Magazine, on the cover and inside spreads accompanying "Ghosts in the Machine". In March 2012, Art in America featured Umbrico's work on the cover and inside along with a short essay by the artist.

She has served as a member of faculty at Bard College's Summer MFA (Milton Avery Graduate School of the Arts) (Chair of MFA Photography from 2004 to 2010), and she is a core faculty member at the School of Visual Arts MFA Photography Video and Related Media in NYC.

== Publications ==
- Variants, 1991
- From Catalogs, 1998
- Out of Place, 2002
- Honeymoon Suites, 2002
- Many Leonards Not Natman, 2010
- Desk Trajectories (As Is), 2010
- Signals Still / Ink (Book) / Out of Order, from the series Signal to Ink, 2011
- Penelope Umbrico: Photographs, Aperture, 2011
- Moving Mountains (1850–2012), Conveyor, 2012
- RANGE, Aperture, 2014
- Out of Order: Used Office Desks and Used Office Plants for Sale, RVB, 2014
- Out of Order: Bad Display, RVB and Photoforum Pasquart, 2016
- Solar Eclipses From the New York Public Library Picture Collection, RVB, 2016

== Awards, grants and residencies ==
- Sharpe-Walentas Studio Fellowship
- Pilchuck Glass School, Artist in Residence
- John Gutmann Photography Fellowship
- Smithsonian Artist Research Fellowship
- Guggenheim Fellowship
- Peter S. Reed Foundation Grant
- New York Foundation for the Arts Artists Fellowship
- Anonymous Was A Woman Award
- Aaron Siskind Foundation Individual Photographer's Fellowship Grant
- New York Foundation for the Arts Catalogue Project Grant

== Exhibitions ==
=== Solo exhibitions ===
- Festival Images Vevey Biennale, Range: of Mount Grammont, site-specific installation, Vevey, Switzerland, 2020
- George Eastman Museum, Everyone's Moon Any License, Rochester NY, 2019
- Ballarat International Foto Biennale, Everyone's Moon Any License, Ballarat, Australia, 2019
- Musée des Beaux Arts, Le Locle, Switzerland, 2018
- Peoria Riverfront Museum, Screen Light, Peoria, IL, 2017
- Special Project, Photo LA, Los Angeles, CA, 2017
- Salon d'Honeur, Paris Photo, Range: of Masters, Paris France, 2016
- Milwaukee Art Museum, Future Perfect, mid-career survey, WI, 2016
- Photoforum PasquArt, Biel/Bienne Festival of Photography, Bienne, Switzerland, 2016
- Bruce Silverstein Gallery, Silvery Light, NYC, 2016
- Grand Central Terminal Light Boxes, Four Photographs of Rays at Grand Central, NY, 2015–2016
- Aldrich Museum, Shallow Sun, CT, 2015
- Alt. + 1000 Festival de Photographie, A Proposal and Two Trades, Rossinière, Switzerland, 2013
- Percent For Art/New York Department of Cultural Affairs, Cabinet 1526–2013, permanent installation for PS/IS 71, completed 2013
- Olson Gallery, Bethel University, St Paul, MN, 2013
- Alt. + 1000 Festival de Photographie, Mountains, Moving: Of Swiss Alp Postcards and Sound of Music, Rossinière, Switzerland, 2013
- Paraty Em Foco, Future, Paraty, Brazil, 2011
- Toronto Pearson International Airport, Universal Sunset, site-specific installation, Contact Photography Festival, 2010
- Brooklyn Academy of Music, Leonards for Leonard, site-specific installation, Brooklyn, NY, 2010
- Bernard Toale Gallery, Boston, MA, 2004
- International Center of Photography, New York, 1992

=== Group exhibitions ===
- George Eastman Museum, Gathering Clouds, Rochester, NY, 2020
- Metro Arts, New For Old, Brisbane, Australia, 2020
- University of Michigan Museum of Art, Art in the Age of the Internet, 1989 to Today, Ann Arbor, MI, 2019
- Onassis Cultural Centre, For Ever More Images, Athens, Greece, 2019
- Metropolitan Museum of Art, Apollo's Muse, New York, 2019
- Postmasters Gallery, Screenscapes, New York, 2018
- Chrysler Museum of Art, From Ansel Adams to Infinity, Norfolk, VA, 2018
- Victoria and Albert Museum, inaugural media wall commission, London, 2018
- Institute of Contemporary Art, Art in the Age of the Internet, 1989 to Today, Boston, MA, 2018
- Denver Art Museum, New Territory: Landscape Photography Today, Denver, CO, 2018
- Jimei x Arles International Photo Festival, Visuality is the Scene of Negligence, Jimei Civic Center and Three Shadows, China, 2017
- Guangzhou Image Triennial 2017 – Simultaneous Eidos, (installation), Guangzhou, China, 2017
- DeCordova Museum, Screens: Virtual Material, Lincoln, MA, 2017
- Galerie Andreas Schmidt, Perfect / Imperfect, Berlin, Germany, 2017
- Goethe Institut, Cyclic Journey/s, Barcelona, Spain, 2017
- Photo Espana, Upload/Download, Madrid, Spain, 2017
- Jeonju International Photo Festival, This Location / Dis-location, Jeonju, China, 2017
- LACMA, TV on Film, Los Angeles, CA, 2017
- Carnegie Museum of Art, Strength in Numbers: Photography in Groups, Pittsburgh, PA, 2016
- Harry Ransom Center, Look Inside: New Photography Acquisitions, Austin, TX, 2016
- Museum für Kunst und Gewerbe, Triennial of Photography, Hamburg, Germany, 2015
- Gallery University Stellenbosch, Think of Number 6, Stellenbosch, South Africa, 2015
- Ivorypress Space, Books beyond Artists: Words and Images, Madrid, Spain, 2015
- Motorenhalle, DIGITAL_ANALOG.INDIFFERENCE, Dresden, Germany, 2015
- Boulder Museum of Contemporary Art, Flatlander, Boulder, CO, 2015
- Sextant et plus, FOMO, Marseille, France, 2015
- BRIC Arts Media House, Brooklyn Biennial, Brooklyn, NY, 2014
- Museum of Modern Art, A World of Its Own: Photographic Practices in the Studio, New York, 2014
- Orange County Museum of Art, California Landscape into Abstraction, Newport Beach, CA, 2014
- Kasseler Kunstverein, Offline Art: Hardcore, curated by Aram Bartholl, Kassel, Germany, 2013
- Le Mois de Photo, Montreal, Canada, 2013
- Centre d'Art Santa Mònica, From Here On, Barcelona, Spain, 2013
- Foto Colectania, Artist as Collector, Barcelona, Spain, 2013
- Somerset House, Landmark: The Fields of Photography, London, 2013
- Aperture Foundation Gallery, Aperture Remix, New York, 2012
- 319 Scholes Gallery, Collect the WWWorld, Bushwick, NY, 2012
- Daegu Photography Biennale, Repositioned Personal, Korea, 2012
- Photographers' Gallery, Born in 1987: The Animated GIF, London, 2012
- Pace MacGill Gallery, Social Media, New York, 2011
- Rencontres d'Arles, From Here On, curated by Fontcuberta, Parr, Schmid, Kessels, Cheroux, Arles, France, 2011
- MassMoCA, Memery: Imitation, Memory, and Internet Culture, North Adams, MA, 2011
- San Francisco Museum of Modern Art, The Anniversary Show, San Francisco, CA, 2009
- PS 1 Contemporary Art Center, Between Spaces, Long Island City, NY, 2009
- Aperture Foundation Gallery, The Edge of Vision, New York, 2009
- New York Photography Festival, The Ubiquitous Image, May 2008
- Gallery of Modern Art, The Leisure Class, Brisbane, Australia, October 2007 – March 2008
- Center for Curatorial Studies, Bard College, Neither Here Nor There: Perceptions of Place, Feb. 2005
- Massachusetts College of Art, Feed, Boston, MA, October 2004
- The Museum of Modern Art, Object and Abstraction: Contemporary Photographs, NY, Sept. 1997
- International Center of Photography, Eye of the Beholder, New York, September 1997
- Creative Time, Art in the Anchorage '96, The Brooklyn Bridge Anchorage, Summer 1996
- The Museum of Modern Art, More Than One Photography, New York, May 1992
- Art in General, The Results Are In, New York, January 1992
- The Drawing Center, Selections 41, New York, February 1988

=== Unclassified exhibitions ===
- 2009: For A Brief Time Only at a Location Near You
- 2011: Exhibition at Rencontres d'Arles festival, Arles, France.
- 2011: Laureate from Rencontres d'Arles Discovery Award.

== Collections ==
Umbrico's work is held in the following public collections:

- Berkeley Art Museum, CA
- International Center of Photography
- Metropolitan Museum of Art
- Museum of Contemporary Photography
- San Francisco Museum of Modern Art
- Carnegie Museum of Art, PA
- George Eastman Museum, Rochester, NY
- Harry Ransom Center, Austin, TX
- Los Angeles County Museum of Art, CA
- McNay Museum, San Antonio, TX
- Milwaukee Art Museum, Milwaukee, WI
- Minneapolis Institute of Art, Minneapolis, MN
- Museum für Kunst und Gewerbe, Hamburg, Germany
- Museum of Contemporary Art San Diego, CA
- Museum of Fine Arts, Houston, TX
- Museum of Modern Art, New York, NY
- Perez Art Museum Miami, FL
- Portland Art Museum, OR
- RISD Museum, RI
- Thoma Art Foundation, Chicago IL
- Victoria and Albert Museum, London
- New York Public Library, NY
- Orange County Museum of Art, CA
- Guggenheim Museum, New York
