= David Horvitz =

American artist

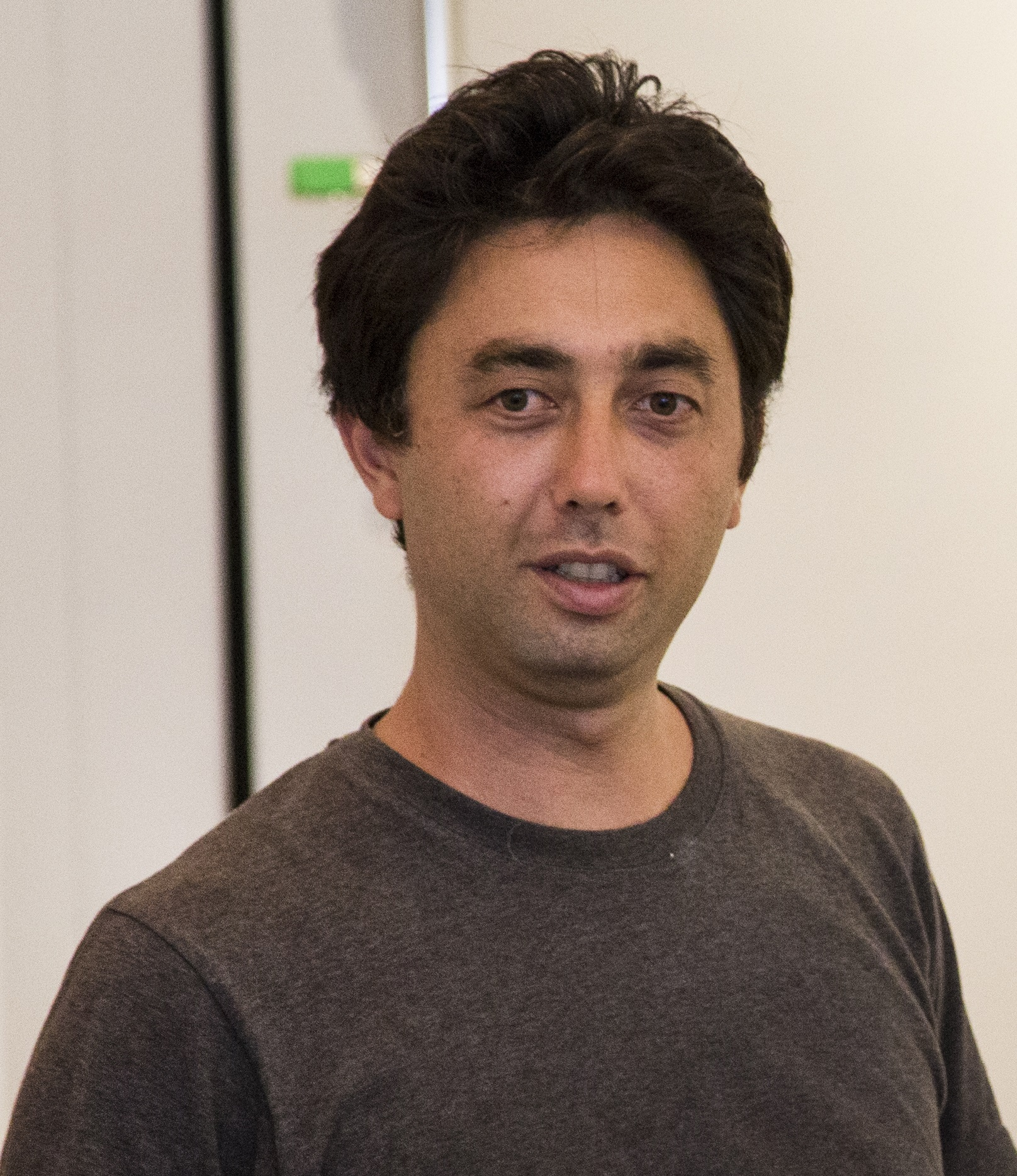
- David Horvitz
- Born: David Horvitz; 1974 (age 51–52); Los Angeles
- Known for: Mail art, photography
- Spouse: Zanna Gilbert
- Awards: Henraux Foundation Prize (2018), Follow Fluxus laureate (2020)

David Horvitz (born 1974) is an American artist who uses art books, photography, performance art, and mail art as media for his work. He is known for his work in the virtual sphere. Horvitz is a graduate from Bard College.

== Career ==
Horvitz uses art books, photography, performance art, watercolor, and mail art as mediums for his work.

The 1970s conceptual artist Bas Jan Ader has been an important influence on Horvitz's art. Horvitz's movie “Rarely Seen Bas Jan Ader Film”, (Note: This video was originally uploaded anonymously to YouTube but then removed as a hoax, since it was not by Bas Jan Ader.) for example, shows a silent black and white clip a few seconds long of a man riding a bicycle into the sea. This evokes the imagery of Ader's works around the theme of falling and the myth surrounding Ader's disappearance at sea. Horvitz's book “Sad, Depressed People” relates back to Ader's movie “I'm too sad to tell you” in that all of the stock images Horvitz collected show people with their heads in their hands, as does Ader.

Another influence on Horvitz's work is On Kawara. As David put it “I relate to On Kawara’s work because of its existential and even zen readings.”

In 2009, Horvitz started the “241543903/Head-in-a-Freezer” meme. People were encouraged to take a picture of their heads in a freezer and upload the image with the tag “241543903”. That way everyone could see each other's images by Googling “241543903”. The meme first gained popularity on Orkut, Google's social network in Brazil. Horvitz spread the word by sending 100 fliers to a friend in Brazil who handed them out to random young people. It is a rare case where an internet meme was spread through IRL means.

In 2013, he created The Distance of a Day (two digital videos, 12 minutes each), an installation showing sunset and sunrise from opposite points on the globe, near Los Angeles and in the Maldives respectively, recorded at the same moment. The sunset and sunrise were shown side by side on the actual phones (two iPhones) that recorded the scenes. The installation was exhibited at the Art Basel fair in June 2013.

On July 18, 2013, as part of an online one-day project named Artist Breakfast, he "invited artists all over the world to share photos and short descriptions of their morning meals with online audiences throughout the day."

Horvitz's Gnomons was exhibited at the New Museum in 2014, featuring four works based on the concept of time. The final work was a performance piece titled Let us Keep our Own Noon, where volunteers rang brass bells in the streets around the museum at solar noon and then walked away from each other until they could not hear other bells. The piece was performed again in 2016 for the 10th anniversary of “Sequences”, Reykjavík's biennial festival of “real time art”.

His work also includes "A Wikipedia Reader", a mind map of artists' browsing of Wikipedia.

His work Public Access (2010) includes photographs of himself at various public beaches in California which were uploaded to the Wikimedia Commons and then inserted into the Wikipedia pages, and the subsequent reaction of the Commons and Wikipedia communities to his actions. These actions included criticism of the quality and artistry of the images, suspicion of the uploader's motives, and deletion of most of the images and/or removal of himself from the images. Public Access is "the piece for which he is most well known" and is one of his projects which existed "only for a short time." Before all items were deleted, Horvitz printed them out, bound them, and covertly placed the bound books in the history sections of local libraries along the California Coast.

In 2014, his "somewhere in between the jurisdiction of time" was displayed at Blum & Poe, featuring water collected from the Pacific Ocean between the Pacific and Alaska Time Zones kept in handmade glass bottles and shown in a straight North/South line. Andrew Berardini described the work as creating "some weird uncrossable divide...The mere suggestion of a demarcation forces our moves".

In 2016, David Horvitz hired a pickpocket to place sculptures in the pockets of attendees of the annual Frieze Art Fair. This was part of “Frieze Projects” a program of 6 commissioned interactive activities at the fair. Said Horvitz, “Imagine how much money is concentrated there, among collectors and galleries—and then there’s this person walking around who’s basically a trained thief,”

In 2025 he exhibited "All the crows of Bad Homburg" at the exhibition of sculptures "Blickachsen" in the historic park of Bad Homburg (Germany)

His published work includes: Xiu Xiu: The Polaroid Project (2007), Everything that can happen in a day (2010), and Sad, Depressed, People (2012).

He has exhibited at SF Camerawork, the Museum of Modern Art, the New Museum, Tate Modern, and Art Metropole.

=== Selected publications ===
- Mood Disorder. Los Angeles: New Documents. 2015. ISBN 9781927354230
- Stolen Spoons. Copenhagen: Pork Salad Press. 2015. ISBN 9788791409776
- How To Shoplift Books. Portland: Publication Studio. 2014. ISBN 9781624620485
- Public Access. Berlin: Motto. 2012.
- Sad. Depressed. People. Los Angeles: New Documents. 2012. ISBN 9781927354018
