= Paul Soulellis =

American graphic designer, artist, and educator

Paul Soulellis Group Jun 28 (28109295225) (cropped)

Paul Soulellis (born 1968, Huntington, New York) is an American graphic designer, artist, and educator. His writings and work in the field of experimental publishing and network culture are cited in influential scholarly research. His publications are collected and exhibited worldwide and on the internet. He works in New York City and Providence, Rhode Island.

== Biography ==
Soulellis is the founder of Library of the Printed Web, a physical archive devoted to web-to-print artists' books, zines and other printout matter. The Printed Web project "embraces the fluid movement between material and digital realms that characterizes our age." He curates, designs and publishes print-on-demand publications that have featured the work of over 180 contemporary artists. According to Soulellis, Printed Web artists "'perform publishing' by investigating multiple materialities and design possibilities as their works travel through the network." Soulellis also maintains his own artist's practice centered on independent publishing.

His work is widely held in special artists' books collections at art and research institutions, including Museum of Modern Art, NY; Walker Art Center, MN; Yale University, CT; Reykjavík Art Museum, Iceland; The Living Art Museum, Iceland; University of North Carolina, Chapel Hill; Hochschule Hof Bibliothek, Germany; Brooklyn Museum, NY; San Francisco Museum of Modern Art, CA; and New York Public Library, NY.

Soulellis is a contributing editor at Rhizome, where he curates The Download, "an ongoing series of artist commissions that considers the ZIP file format, the act of downloading and the computer user's desktop as a space for exhibition."

== Writing ==
Writing and curatorial projects by Soulellis

- "Digital Publishing, Unzipped," Rhizome, 2015
- "The Download 1: Sorry to dump on you like this.zip," Rhizome, 2015
- "After the Hookup, An App," Rhizome, 2015
- "The Download 2: The Distributed Monument," Rhizome 2016
- "The Download 3: Incantations for the Birth of a Network," Rhizome, 2016
- "The Download 4: Technologies of Care," Rhizome, 2016
- "The Download 5: Dennis Cooper's GIF Novels," Rhizome, 2016.
- "The Download 6: A Desktop Lamentation," Rhizome, 2017.
- "Occupying Plöger's Library," Exhibition Catalogue for Inherited Lies by Wolfgang Plöger, 2017.
- "Urgent Archives," in Public, Private, Secret: On Photography and the Configuration of Self, edited by Charlotte Cotton, Aperture and ICP, 2018.

== Publications ==
Publications by Soulellis

- Venetian Suite. Venice: self-published, 2010. Set of 4 unique book objects.
- Memory Palace. Rome: self-published, 2011. Unique book object.
- 273 Relics for John Cage. New York: self-published, 2011. 294 pages, edition of 10 copies.
- Weymouths. England: commission by b-side arts festival, 2012. 12 volumes, edition of 20 copies.
- The Spectral Lens (Twenty-Six Stories from the Book Machine). New York: self-published, 2012. 140 pages, print-on-demand, 20 copies printed.
- 530 (Sá veldur sem á heldur). Skagaströnd, Iceland: self-published, 2013. 530 pages, edition of 50 copies.
- Apparition of a distance, however near it may be. New York: self-published, 2013. 42 pages, print-on-demand, unlimited edition.
- Chancebook #1: March 26, 2013 (Why Does It Hurt So Bad). New York: self-published, 2013. 112 pages, print-on-demand, edition of 1.
- Chancebook #2: May 3, 2013 (Livin' on the Fault Line). New York: self-published, 2013. 198 pages, print-on-demand, edition of 1.
- Las Meninas. New York: self-published, 2013. 32 newsprint pages, edition of 50 copies.
- Search, Compile, Publish: Towards a new artist’s web-to-print practice. New York: self-published, 2013. 4 newsprint pages, edition of 500 copies.
- Stripped (Sixty-Six Sunsets Stripped). New York: self-published, 2013. 74 pages, print-on-demand, unlimited edition.
- Portlander. Portland, England: commission by b-side arts festival, 2014. 64 newsprint pages, edition of 3,000 copies.
- LaRossa Mix. New York: self-published, 2014. ISBN 9780984005239. 8 newsprint pages, edition of 150.
- 420 Videos. New York: self-published, 2014. 32 newsprint pages, print-on-demand, unlimited edition.
- Library of the Printed Web, Spring Inventory. New York: Library of the Printed Web, 2013. 124 pages, print-on-demand, unlimited edition.
- Printed Web 1. New York: Library of the Printed Web, 2014. ISBN 978-0-9840052-2-2. 64 newsprint pages, edition of 1,000 copies.
- Printed Web 2. New York: Library of the Printed Web, 2014. ISBN 978-0-9840052-4-6. 180 pages, print-on-demand, unlimited edition.
- A BOOK IS THE BOOK. New York: self-published. 149 slides and performance.
- Printed Web 3, Reader/Index. New York: Library of the Printed Web. ISBN 9781320767903. 388 pages, print-on-demand, unlimited edition.
- Printed Web 3, 10 zines. New York: Library of the Printed Web, 2015.
  - COCA-OR. 24 pages, print-on-demand, unlimited edition.
  - CSS. 24 pages, print-on-demand, unlimited edition.
  - JPG 2000. 24 pages, print-on-demand, unlimited edition.
  - Personal Blue. 24 pages, print-on-demand, unlimited edition.
  - fffffffunnyfearlessfemmefataleorverynaughtygurls. 24 pages, print-on-demand, unlimited edition.
  - Nakamoto. 24 pages, print-on-demand, unlimited edition.
  - JLO. 24 pages, print-on-demand, unlimited edition.
  - Little Nicolas. 24 pages, print-on-demand, unlimited edition.
  - Western Typologies. 24 pages, print-on-demand, unlimited edition.
  - Freebeer (and one donut). 24 pages, print-on-demand, unlimited edition.
- Printed Web 3, Chinatown Edition. New York: Library of the Printed Web, 2015. 538 pages, edition of 10 copies.
- Printed Web 3, PDF Skins. New York: Library of the Printed Web, 2015. 10 PDF prints on neoprene fabric, edition of 10 copies.
- Printed Web 3, server directory. New York: Library of the Printed Web, Rhizome, 2015. Apache server directory at Rhizome.org. 147 folders containing 329 files.
- Three Digs A Skull, Clement Valla. New York: Printed Web Editions, 2015. 72 pages, print-on-demand, unlimited edition.
- Abstract Browsing, Rafaël Rozendaal. New York: Printed Web Editions, 2016. 72 pages, print-on-demand, unlimited edition.
- Printed Web 4. New York: Library of the Printed Web and International Center of Photography, 2016. ISBN 978-0-9840052-8-4. 40 newsprint pages, print-on-demand, unlimited edition.
- Sorry to dump on you like this.zip, Christopher Clary. New York: Printed Web Editions, 2016. 72 pages, print-on-demand, unlimited edition.
- Printed Web 5: Bot Anthologia. Providence: Library of the Printed Web, 2017. 64 pages, print-on-demand.
- Molly Soda Youtube, Molly Soda. Providence: Printed Web Editions, 2017. 64 pages, print-on-demand, unlimited edition.
- Thank you for your interest in this subject. Providence, Printed Web Crisis Editions, 2017. 44 pages, print-on-demand, unlimited edition.
- Library of the Printed Web: Collected Works 2013–2017. Providence, Library of the Printed Web, 2017. 548 pages, print-on-demand.
- Steve, Harvey and Matt. Providence: Paul Soulellis, 2018. 734 pages, print-on-demand, unlimited edition.
- QUEER.ARCHIVE.WORK 1. Providence: Paul Soulellis. September 2018.
- QUEER.ARCHIVE.WORK 2: 1923 INTERNET ARCHIVE EDITION. San Francisco: Paul Soulellis. January 2019.
- QUEER.ARCHIVE.WORK 3. Providence: Paul Soulellis. September 2019.
- Notes on Quantum Queerness. Binch Press: Queer Archive Work, 2024.

== Interviews and talks ==
Interviews and talks featuring Soulellis

- "The Artful Accidents of Google Books," Kenneth Goldsmith, The New Yorker, 2013.
- "Paul Soulellis talks with Christina Webb," HTML Output, 2014.
- "Turning Pixels into Print: An Interview About the Printed Web," Hrag Vartanian, Hyperallergic, 2015.
- "Paul Soulellis: Scenes from a Designer's Counterpractice," Ariela Gittlen, Elephant Magazine, 2016.
- "Interview with David Senior and Sarah Hamerman," Museum of Modern Art Library, 2016.
- "A Conversation with Paul Soulellis," Kate Palmer Albers, Circulation | Exchange, 2016.
- "2016: The Year According to Paul Soulellis," Walker Art Center, 2016.
- "Library of the Printed Web: The Guy Who Makes Art Out of the Internet," Vice Magazine, 2017.
- "In Conversation: Paul Soulellis and Allison Parrish," Eyebeam, at Babycastles, 2017.
- "Performing the Feed," Cybernetics Conference, 2017.
- "Focus: Paul Soulellis of Library of the Printed Web, Are.na, 2017.
- "Watch: Insights 2018: Paul Soulellis on Urgent Archives, Queer Publishing, and Strategic Leaking," Walker Art Center, 2018.
- "Paul Soulellis turns the internet into tangible art," Document Journal, 2018.
- "Paul Soulellis at the Grand Re-Opening of the Public Domain," Creative Commons, 2019.

== Exhibitions and events ==
Group exhibitions and events featuring Soulellis

- "Directed: The Intersection of Book, Film and Visual Narrative," Minnesota Center for Book Arts, MN, 2013
- "Ed Ruscha, Books & Co," Gagosian Gallery, NY, 2013
- "Printing Out the Internet," Labor Gallery, Mexico, 2013
- "Due North," Icebox Project Space, PA, 2014
- "It Narratives: The Movement of Objects as Information," Franklin Street Works, CT, 2014
- "Undefined by Design," Lorimoto Gallery, NY, 2014
- "Tabularium," Slopes, Melbourne, Australia, 2014
- "Public, Private, Secret," International Center of Photography Museum, NY, 2016
- "Aerial Imagery in Print from 1860 to Today," Museum of Modern Art, NY, 2016
- "Publish or Perish," Transmitter Gallery, NY, 2016
- "Variable States: Print Now," Upfor Gallery, OR, 2016
- "Trust and Believe," Eyebeam, 2017.
- "Art for the Offline Internet: El Paquete Seminal on The Download," Rhizome/New Museum, 2018.
- "Queering the Collection: Emergency Readings," International Center of Photography Library, NY, 2018.

== Teaching ==
Soulellis joined the full-time faculty at Rhode Island School of Design in 2015 as assistant professor, graphic design. His Experimental Publishing Studio syllabus at RISD was cited as "required reading" by Rhizome. He has conducted workshops, been a visiting critic, and lectured at numerous schools and institutions in the US and Europe.
