= Mercedes Carrera =

American pornographic actress

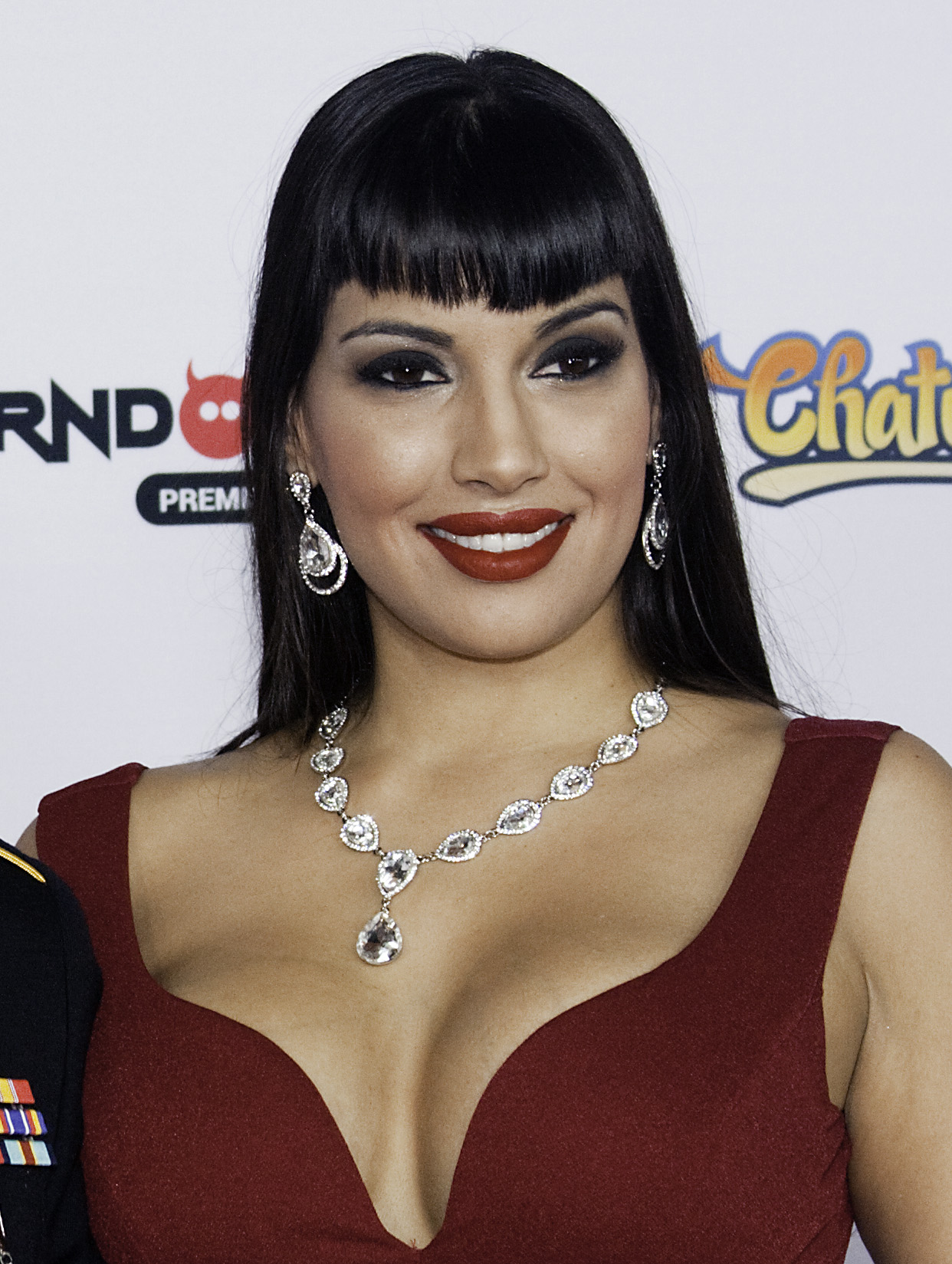
- Carrera in 2016
- Born: 1983 or 1984 (age 42–43); Los Angeles, California, U.S.
- Other name: Mercedes Carrera
- Occupation: Pornographic actress

Mercedes Carrera is an American pornographic actress. She was a frequent commentator in support of the antifeminist Gamergate campaign and collaborated with the pro-Gamergate group The Fine Young Capitalists in 2015 on a fundraiser for students in STEM fields. In 2019, Carrera and her husband Jason Whitney were arrested on suspicion of child sexual abuse.

== Early life and education ==
Before entering the adult film industry, Carrera worked as an aerospace engineer. Carrera's ancestry is Puerto Rican, Native American and Swedish. Carrera has also specified that her Puerto Rican ancestry is a mix of African, Jewish and European.

== Pornography career ==
Carrera has appeared in more than 200 films. She is known for her performances in films which focused on the MILF subgenres, especially "Cougar" and "Latin". She has worked in film productions for Brazzers, Reality Kings, Wicked Pictures, Digital Playground and Evil Angel, among others.

In 2015, Carrera performed in a live webcam show as a fundraiser for the pro-Gamergate group The Fine Young Capitalists. The funds went toward a scholarship for students studying in STEM fields.

== Personal life ==
Carrera was a frequent commentator in support of the antifeminist online campaign known as Gamergate and a vocal critic of its detractors, including feminist media critic Anita Sarkeesian. She discussed rape culture with Infowars host Paul Joseph Watson and debated Gamergate opponent Chris Kluwe; The Daily Caller described Carrera as "Gamergate’s Porn Star Patron". In October 2015, she was removed from a panel at the media festival South by Southwest following allegations that Carrera had cyberbullied the activist Randi Lee Harper. Carrera identifies as a libertarian.

In February 2019, Carrera was arrested along with her husband Jason Whitney (aka Daemon Cins) at their home in Rancho Cucamonga on suspicion of child sexual abuse. The pair were accused of sexually abusing a girl under the age of 10 multiple times over a four-month period; they were also charged with possessing a controlled substance (methamphetamine) while armed with a handgun. They were denied bail. As of January 2023, both remain in jail awaiting trial. On January 30, 2024, it was reported that Carrera's pretrial hearing had been postponed again, with a new date scheduled for February 16 (over 5 years after her arrest), and the earliest possible date for her trial being April 16. This marked the sixth time that Judge Katrina West had reset the date for the pretrial hearing.

== Awards and nominations ==
- AVN Awards
  - 2016
    - Nomination: Best All-Girl Group Sex Scene - Sisterhood
    - Nomination: Hottest MILF (Fan Award)
    - Nomination: MILF Performer of the Year
  - 2017
    - Nomination: Best Supporting Actress - Project Pandora
    - Nomination: Best Virtual Reality Sex Scene - Kim Kardashian Supertar VR Experience
    - Nomination: MILF Performer of the Year
  - 2018
    - Nomination: Best All-Girl Group Sex Scene - MILF Performer of the Year 2017
    - Nomination: Best Three-Way Sex Scene (B/B/G) - Forked
    - Nomination: MILF Performer of the Year
  - 2019
    - Nomination: Best Actress, Feature Movie - Second First Date
    - Nomination: MILF Performer of the Year
- GayVN Awards
  - 2019 Nomination: Best Bi Sex Scene - Coming Out Bi 4
- Transgender Erotica Awards
  - 2018 Nomination: Best Non-TS Performer
  - 2019 Nomination: Best Non-TS Female Performer
- NightMoves Awards
  - 2015
    - Nomination: Best New Starlet (Editor's Choice)
    - Nomination: Best New Starlet (Fan's Choice)
- Spank Bank Awards
  - 2017 Nomination: Most Magnificent MILF
  - 2018
    - Nomination: Exotic Femme Fatale of the Year
    - Nomination: Group/Orgy Maestro of the Year
    - Nomination: Most Volumptous Vixen
- XBIZ Awards
  - 2016 Nomination: MILF Performer of the Year
  - 2017
    - Nomination: Best Actress, Couples-Themed Release - Forked
    - Nomination: Best Sex Scene, All-Girl - Project Pandora
    - Nomination: Best Sex Scene, Couples-Themed Release - Forked
    - Nomination: MILF Performer of the Year
  - 2018
    - Nomination: Best Sex Scene, Couples-Themed Release - Ingenue
    - Nomination: MILF Performer of the Year
  - 2019
    - Nomination: Best Sex Scene, Couples-Themed Release - Making Ends Meet
    - Nomination: Best Sex Scene, Gonzo Release - Mother Fuckin' Anal
    - Nomination: Best Sex Scene, Vignette Release - MILF Stories: Still Sexy
    - Nomination: MILF Performer of the Year
- XCritic Awards
  - 2018
    - Nomination: Best Actress - Second First Date
    - Nomination: Best MILF Performer
    - Nomination: Social Media Queen
- XRCO Awards
  - 2016 Nomination: MILF Performer of the Year
  - 2017 Nomination: MILF Performer of the Year
