= Crash Override =

Crash Override may refer to:

- "Crash Override", the protagonist's alias in the 1995 American crime film Hackers
- The Crash Override Network, a support group (founded 2015) for victims of large scale online abuse
- Crashoverride, a malware framework presumed to have been used in the 2016 cyberattack on Ukraine's power grid
- Crash Override (book), a 2017 memoir by Zoë Quinn of the Crash Override Network
