= Association of LGBTI Journalists =

French LGBTI group

- Association des journalistes LGBTI
- Founded: May 2013
- Headquarters: Paris
- Region served: France
- President: Rachel Garrat-Valcarcel, Ingrid Therwath
- Affiliations: membre du centre LGBT Paris Ile-de-France
- Website: ajlgbt.info

The Association of LGBTI Journalists (or AJL) is an LGBTI group founded in France in 2013. This French nonprofit association works towards a better media coverage of LGBTI issues, of issues related to gender identity and sexual orientation. Its members are journalists from a wide range of newsrooms as well as freelance journalists. Since 2017, the AJL has been organizing an annual ceremony, the « Out d’or » (the Golden Outs or Outs of Gold), during which artists, journalists and diverse personalities are awarded for their work towards LGBTI visibility.

== Founded in the wake of the debates surrounding the French Marriage Equality Bill ==
The Association of LGBTI Journalists (which became the LGBTI journalists’ association) was founded in May 2013 shortly after the Marriage Equality Bill (known as Mariage pour Tous) was passed in France. Its founding members were shocked by the careless manner in which the media platformed the homophobic arguments of the bill's opponents. These journalists regretted that « the space given to the opponents and their hate speech had been justified by the need to give a « balanced treatment » of this issue ».

Everything happened as if the homophobic nature of the comments were only a matter of opinion and not a punishable offence », the association explains in its introduction. The members of the AJL wish to challenge the media « each time content that is insulting and discriminatory against gay, lesbians, bi, transgender and intersex persons is published ».

The creation of the AJL was marked by the publication of a collective article for an LGBT journalists’ association published in the daily newspaper Libération on 16 May 2013. « Through its scrutiny of the « Fourth Estate », the association probably hopes to contribute to the change in mentalities », later wrote the news weekly L'Express. The AJL got its inspiration from the American National Lesbian and Gay Journalists Association, founded in 1990 by Leroy F. Aarons.

== Activities of the AJL ==
On its website, the association details its different activities: the publication of studies, of a best-practice tool kit, acting as media watchdog, teaching and awareness-raising journalism schools, participating in conferences... The AJL engages and challenges the media when it feels that the LGBT people are misrepresented. In 2014, it questioned TV5 Monde about the terms it chose to present a debate on its Facebook.

On October 13, 2016, the association wrote a piece to expose the transphobic remarks that occurred on the set of the opening show of the Grand journal (Canal +) new season, during the first appearance of Brigitte Boréale, a transgender woman, as a columnist. The AJL announced it would petition the Conseil supérieur de l'audiovisuel (CSA, Superior Council of the Audiovisual.) In 2016, the AJL published another article in the daily newspaper Libération about the media coverage of the 12 June 2016 Orlando shooting. "When the details American shooting became known, very few French news outlet underlined the homophobic nature of the attack", wrote the AJL. The AJL also takes a stance about journalists’ working-conditions. For instance, in February 2019, after the cyber-bullying of women journalists by male journalists belonging to the « Ligue du LOL », the AJL and the feminist association Prenons la Une co-signed an article titled "The League of the LOL is by no means an exception" in Le Monde. In this article, the AJL urged "the editorial managers to take stock of the extent of the cyber-bullying targeting female journalists, in particular if they belong to an ethnic minority, are differently-abled, fat, or if they belong to the LGBTQ+ community". The AJL recommends "hiring, in mass, women, people from diverse ethnic backgrounds, LGBTQ+ people to fill in the key jobs in the newsrooms » so as to do way with « the reality of a male domination based on the cooptation and the club mentality of white, straight men".

The AJL takes an interest in the way LGBT characters are portrayed on TV fiction, as was the case about the show Louis(e), which was the first French TV series broadcast by TFI with a transgender heroin. The AJL regularly takes part in conferences, for instance the Festival international du Journalisme de Pérouse, in 2015 and the 10th Assises du journalisme in 2016. The AJL raises awareness about prejudice and delivers courses about the fair journalistic treatment of LGBTI issues in journalism schools like the ESJ-Lille or the IPJ.

Since heterosexuality is a public matter (and on constant public display), the AJL wishes that homosexuality was not systematically limited to the private sphere. In 2014, the outing of Florian Philippot, the Rassemblement national's vice-president, by the magazine Closer had shocked many political actors and many people in the media. According to the AJL, such an outrage was deeply problematic: its spokesperson explained that "there is something very French in the belief that revealing somebody's homosexuality is a monstrous invasion of his or her privacy". Alice Coffin is the co-president of the association in 2017.

=== A tool kit for the media ===
The AJL wished that the media were more careful in the words used to address LGBT persons, their families, friends and loved ones. On the eve of a demonstration organized by the Manif pour tous on 2 February 2014, the AJL sent a press release to the French media asking fellow journalists to "be careful in their choices of words" and to "do in-depth work on these issues". Some people criticized this initiative. For instance, a journalist working for the Figaro, compared it to an attempt at « re-education ».

During the June 2014 Pride March in Paris, the AJL published a toolkit aimed at the media and entitled "Informing without discriminating". The daily newspaper 20Minutes wrote: "with eight chapters such as "choosing the right words", "doing away with lesbian invisibility", "stereotypical representation of gay men" or "HIV-AIDS, how to talk about it?", this toolkit points at some of the media's bad habits. It tries to show how some words or expressions are inadequate and suggests alternatives." On the whole, the toolkit received a favourable response by the media.

Oui FM pointed to the necessity of such a toolkit :

Sometimes, the way we do our work and our values are discriminatory because of our reflexes, our habits, our hurtful humour, and our discriminatory treatment of information. This is not a text that coerces but one that raises awareness.

The weekly L'Express wrote: « This initiative invites us to ponder over the importance of words. This also applies to minorities, people for disadvantaged backgrounds, and religious groups". The women journalists’ collective Prenons la Une took example on the AJL for its own charter of "good terms" to use when dealing with violence against women.

=== A charter against homophobia ===
In May 2015, The AJL announced that 25 French media houses had signed its charter against homophobia. Among them were print dailies (Le Monde, L'Équipe...), radio stations (Oui FM, Radio Nova...), and news websites (StreetPress, Mediapart...). In a tribune published by Libération on 14 May 2015, the AJL explained that the signatories had agreed to abide by several principles such as "the equal treatment of homosexuals, bisexuals and heterosexuals", "a fair and equal treatment of transgender persons" and "the prevention of any type of discrimination based on sexual orientation or gender identity in their newsrooms". The number of signatories doubled within two years and, in 2017, the AJL stated that about 50 media had signed the charter.

=== Studies on the media treatment of LGBTQ people ===
==== Case study: homophobia on the TV show Touche pas à mon poste ! ====
The AJL acts as a watchdog on the media treatment of LGBT persons and issues. In this spirit, it published a study entitled "Hanouna on C8: a month of ordinary homophobia". Over a period of a month (November 2016), the AJL recorded 42 mentions of homosexuality, amongst which 28 were "meant as bad taste jokes of a sexual nature", in the show Touche pas à mon poste ! on the TV channel C8^{"}. Many French media quoted this study but the show's host Cyril Hanouna did not comment of the accusation of homophobia leveled against him.

A few months later, on 18 May 2017, Hanouna played a homophobic prank live on his show. In return, the AJL, published an article on the website of L'Express and stated that« the host of such a popular show should not give such an "example" of stigmatizing and humiliating a minority." The AJL exposed " a culture of bullying and homophobia" that could be conducive to the trivialization of malevolent acts amongst young viewerss. According to the AJL, "gays are hypersexualized characters on this show and it is precisely one of the cornerstone of homophobic jokes". According to the AJL:

Gays are hypersexualized characters on this show and it is precisely one of the cornerstone of homophobic jokes.

==== A study on five talk-shows ====
During the month of November 2017, the AJL decide to focus on 5 major French talk-shows: Quotidien, On n’est pas couché, Salut les terriens, L’heure des pros et C politique. This meant watching and analyzing about 100 hours of TV content. The AJL selected these 5 shows "because of their influence and their popularity", explained Clément Giuliano, the AJL's co-president. More than 50 occurrences of "particularly discriminatory or problematic" content aimed at LGBT minorities, women and Muslims were identified by the AJL. The breakdown is as follows: 17 LGBT-phobic occurrences, including 6 targeting the transgender people, in addition to 20 occurrences of sexism, 9 occurrences of racism, and 8 occurrences during which sexual harassment was blatantly minimized.

“The findings of this study are worrying because they point out how difficult it is for TV shows to treat LGBT people, minorities and women in a respectful manner”, the AJL remarked.

=== The « Out d'or » ceremony ===
Modelled after the American Glaad Awards, a ceremony named "Out d’or" has been organized annually since 2017.

== See also ==
- Alice Coffin
- Ingrid Therwath
