= OAPI =

OAPI may refer to:

- Organisation Africaine de la Propriété Intellectuelle, an intellectual property organization
- Online Abuse Prevention Initiative, a non-profit organization
