= Code: Debugging the Gender Gap =

CODE: Debugging the Gender Gap
- Directed by: Robin Hauser Reynolds
- Music by: Laura Karpman
- Production company: Finish Line Features
- Release date: April 19, 2015 (Tribeca Film Festival)
- Running time: 80 minutes
- Country: United States
- Language: English

CODE: Debugging the Gender Gap is a 2015 documentary by Robin Hauser Reynolds. It focuses on the lack of women and minorities in the field of software engineering. It premiered on April 19, 2015 at the Tribeca Film Festival in New York. The film focuses on inspiring young girls to pursue careers in computer science by profiling successful women in computer programming, such as, Danielle Feinberg of Pixar, Aliya Rahman of Code for Progress, and Julie Ann Horvath. By profiling and displaying the careers of these women, the film makers hope to show that computer science can be creative, lucrative, and rewarding.

The film traces the history of women in the U.S. technology industries, from the work of Ada Lovelace, Grace Hopper, and the women of ENIAC. It then follows the decline of women graduates in mathematics and computer science during the 1980s, linking the phenomenon to the release of the 1983 film WarGames, and a cultural shift that depicted men and boys as technology workers, and increasing hostility for women and girls in the tech industries. Additionally, the film highlights the work of women in the field, by featuring interviews with women in the tech industry, such as Kimberly Bryant (founder of Black Girls Code), Debbie Sterling (founder of GoldieBlox), Maria Klawe (president of Harvey Mudd College), and Danielle Feinberg (director of photography at Pixar).

== Fundraising ==
Funding for the film was partially raised via Indiegogo and Reynolds was able to successfully receive additional funding from corporations like CapitalOne, MasterCard, Ericsson, NetApp, Qualcomm, and Silicon Valley Bank.

== Reception ==
The general reception of the film by popular press has been positive. Stephen Cass of IEEE Spectrum, stated of the film: "Code doesn't have all the answers, of course. But ultimately, it does make a good case that everyone should think deliberately about diversity in their hiring." Some criticism has focused on the apparent lack of attention paid to the Gamergate controversy, and the work and experience of women in the gaming industries.

Graham Winfrey of Inc. magazine wrote, "CODE makes a compelling case that the lack of women in tech poses a significant threat to America's future."

== Awards ==
- Gold Audience Award for Active Cinema at the Mill Valley Film Festival (2015, won)
