= Made with Code =

Initiative launched by Google

- Formation: 19 July 2014 (12 years ago)
- Founder: Google
- Website: madewithcode.com

Made with Code is an initiative launched by Google on 19 July 2014 aimed to empower young women in middle and high schools with computer programming skills. Made with Code was established after Google's research found that encouragement and exposure are the critical factors that would influence young females to pursue careers in computer science. It was reported that Google is providing $50 million in funding to Made with Code, on top of the initial $40 million invested since 2010 in organizations like Code.org, Black Girls Code, and Girls Who Code. The Made with Code initiative involves both online activities as well as real life events, collaborating with notable firms like Shapeways and App Inventor.

== Projects ==
Made with Code revolves primarily around providing online activities for young girls to learn coding on its website. Many of Made with Code's projects use Blockly programming, a visual editor that writes programs by assembling individual blocks. Step by step instructions are provided to guide users. Along the way, works may either be discarded or saved and downloaded.

=== Dance Visualiser ===
Dance Visualiser mixes dance with code by modelling a visualiser that mirrors a dancer's motions. Through the application of Blockly programming, users track the different parts such as the head, chest, hip and four limbs of the dancer's body. After inputting the necessary details, a customized visualization is generated accordingly.

=== Music Mixer ===
In Music Mixer, users manipulate the number of notes and set the speed of each instrument to produce a colorful rotating visual music mixer. The range of instruments that are available include Acapella, Country, Electronic, HipHop, Pop and Rock.

=== Beats ===
Beats connects Blockly programming language and virtual instruments together to produce a string of beats. Users set the speed from a minimum of 30 to a maximum of 300 beats. The range of virtual instruments available include hi-hat, clave, cowbell, cymbal, tom, kick, snare and clap.

=== Avatar ===
Project Avatar allows users to customize their own avatar. Through Blockly programming language, users input different shapes on a virtual 2D work space, then arrange the shapes into a 3D avatar.

=== Accessorizer ===
Accessorizer allow to accessorize (put accessories on) a selfie with Blockly programming language. The first step is selecting an image, either by snapping a picture or selecting the available characters including Dorothy, Rose, Smoosh, Raul and Blanche. The next step is to position the accessories on top of the character or image. Accessories include the eyes, mouths, shirts, hats and wigs.

=== GIF ===
GIF lets users make a custom animation with a background and a series of frame. With the Blockly programming language, four images can be constructed which will then cycle so as to form an animation. The first step is to select the background, which includes characters such as Licky Ricky, Mayday Mary, Puss in Moon Boots, Purple Mess, Flappy the Uni-Horn, Tonsil Tammy, Bucky, Long Lidia, Permy and Mr. Hula Hips. The next step is to select frame(s), which includes various shapes and colors.

=== Kaleidoscope ===
Kaleidoscope lets users manipulate the size, speed, and images of a kaleidoscope animation. After selecting an animation, either star, cross or flower, users pick an image and select a rotation speed. Next, select the image size by entering a percentage value.

=== Yeti ===
Yeti project allows users to create an animated Yeti with Blockly programming language. The first step is to drag and insert the YETI block onto the work space, followed by the character design block. Select the fur and skin color of your Yeti, as well as the hand and feet sizes. Next, select the animation command from the various range of actions provided.

=== Past notable projects ===
==== Code a Bracelet ====
Made with Code collaborated with Shapeways to allow girls to create their own customised bracelet. After designing the bracelet with Blockly, Shapeways prints the bracelets using nylon plastic on their 3D EOS printers.

== Mentors and makers ==
Made with Code website features videos of mentors, who are females in different industries who have used computer coding in their career, and makers, who are young females who have made a difference in society using their coding skills. Some of the mentors and makers were also invited to hold talks such as during Made with Code's kick off event in New York City. Over 100 teenage girls from local organizations and public schools worked on coding projects and witnessed first-hand how women use code in their dream jobs.

=== List of mentors ===
- Ayah Bdeir
- Danielle Feinberg
- Erica Kochi
- Limor Fried
- Miral Kotb
- Robin Hunicke

=== List of makers ===
- Brittany Wenger
- Kenzie Wilson
- Maddy Maxey
- EPA Chica Squad
- Tesca Fitzgerald
- Ebony "WondaGurl" Oshunrinde

== Events ==
Made with Code website has a resource directory for parents and girls to enter their ZIP code and find more information about new local events.

=== 92nd annual White House Christmas Tree Lighting Ceremony ===
Made with Code partnered with National Park Foundation to organise a campaign in 2014 to light up 56 official White House Christmas trees in President's Park. More than 300,000 people, mostly young girls, participated and programmed the designs of the lights on the trees through selecting different shapes, sizes, and colors of the lights, and animate different patterns using introductory programming language.

== Others ==
=== Partnership with Code School ===
Made with Code has partnered with Code School in June 2014 and provided three-month free accounts in Code School for women and minorities already in the technology industry to expand their skills. This initiative widened Made with Code's target group to also include those who have already started a career in the tech industry, in addition to the initial target group of young without prior coding experience.

Google raise gender diversity in Code School by giving $50 million over three years to provide for related programs. They concurrently work with DonorsChoose.org and Codecademy or Khan Academy for the trial of a project. They also collaborated with the Science and Entertainment Exchange.
