= Zoë Quinn =

American video game developer (born 1987)

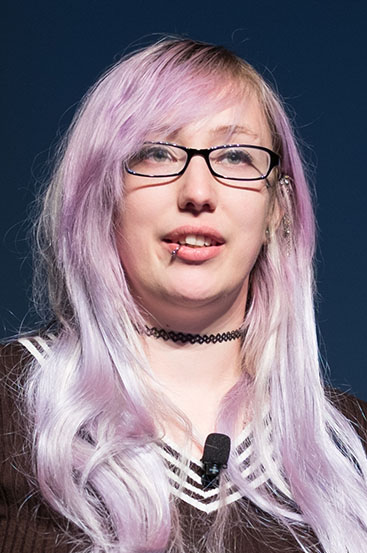
- Quinn at the 2015 XOXO Festival
- Born: 1987 (age 38–39); United States
- Occupation: Video game developer
- Known for: Depression Quest
- Website: unburntwitch.com

Zoë Tiberius Quinn (born 1987) is an American video game developer, programmer, and writer. Quinn developed the interactive fiction game Depression Quest, which was released in 2013. In 2014, a blog post by their (Note: Quinn uses they/them pronouns.) ex-boyfriend sparked the online harassment campaign known as Gamergate, during which Quinn was subjected to extensive harassment, including doxing, rape threats, and death threats. The following year, Quinn co-founded Crash Override, a crisis hotline and resource center for victims of online harassment.

== Early life ==
Zoë Tiberius Quinn was born in 1987 and was reared in a small town near the Adirondack Mountains in New York. Growing up, Quinn's favorite video game was Commander Keen, an MS-DOS game featuring an eight-year-old protagonist who builds a spaceship with items found around his house and then travels the galaxy defending the Earth. Quinn suffered from depression as a teenager, having been diagnosed with the condition at age 14. They described receiving little sympathy or assistance from school district officials who were "less than understanding about teens with depression and suicide issues".

== Career ==
At the age of 24, Quinn moved to Canada and made their first foray into video game programming. Quinn's first game was the result of a six-week course on video game creation that they attended after seeing an advertisement in a newspaper. In a later interview for The New Yorker, Quinn said, "I felt like I'd found my calling."

=== Depression Quest ===
One of Quinn's earliest creative works, Depression Quest, was conceived as a "choose-your-own path" adventure detailing the troubled life of a person suffering from depression, with many of the "correct" paths blocked due to the protagonist's struggle with mental self-care. Quinn thought this sort of game narrative would be a good way to depict depression, imposing a set of rules on players that might not experience such problems in their day-to-day lives. Depression Quest was released in February 2013.

Quinn attempted to publish the game on Steam Greenlight service twice – in December 2013 and later in August 2014, when it was accepted and released by Steam. Depression Quest was featured in a Playboy article as one of several video games dealing with the subjective experience of depression.

=== Other projects ===
Quinn created the Game Developer Help List, designed to bring experienced game developers and novice developers into contact with one another. In 2014, Quinn intended to be part of the canceled YouTube reality television show codenamed "Game_Jam", which was meant to bring together a number of prominent indie game developers.

In 2015, Quinn served as a narrative design consultant for Loveshack Entertainment's iOS game Framed. As of 2014, Quinn was also working on a full motion video game starring Greg Sestero.

In 2015, Quinn wrote a chapter for Videogames for Humans, a book about games made using the Twine tool. Quinn also contributed a chapter to the book The State of Play: Sixteen Voices on Video Games, detailing their experiences making Depression Quest and the subsequent harassment they faced. In 2015, Quinn appeared in the documentary GTFO. They also wrote a scenario for "Widow's Walk", an expansion for Betrayal at House on the Hill, released in 2016.

In September 2016, Quinn was reported to be working with erotica author Chuck Tingle on a full motion dating sim under the working title "Project Tingler". The game was finally named "Kickstarted in the Butt: A Chuck Tingle Digital Adventure" and a Kickstarter campaign was started in October 2016 asking for $69,420 to fund the project. The game raised over $85,000 from 2,450 backers weeks later. In January 2018, Quinn's role as Narrative Designer at Heart Machine's upcoming game Solar Ash was also announced.

In June 2018, Quinn's career as a comics writer started with the announcement of their work with illustrator Robbi Rodriguez on DC Vertigo's Goddess Mode, which became one of the last comics released under the Vertigo label. In July 2019, their participation in the upcoming issues of IDW Publishing's The Addams Family: The Bodies Issue and Marvel's Fearless was announced.

Quinn has additionally worked on 2064: Read Only Memories, Alien: Rogue Incursion, Fez, Jazzpunk, and They Bleed Pixels.

Quinn is interested in human enhancement and has implanted an NTAG216 NFC chip in the back of their hand that can be programmed to perform various functions. Their first use of the chip was to load it with the download code for the game Deus Ex. Quinn also has a magnetic implant in their left ring finger.

=== Harassment and Gamergate ===
Quinn has faced harassment in response to Depression Quest since the game's initial release. This intensified with the additional publicity the game received on Steam. Quinn initially withdrew the game from Steam's Greenlight service, after having a detailed rape threat mailed to their home address. When they brought Depression Quest back to Greenlight, Quinn began receiving threatening phone calls.

In August 2014, Eron Gjoni, a former boyfriend of Quinn, posted a lengthy blog post detailing his relationship with them. Based on the contents of the post, Quinn was falsely accused of receiving positive coverage from a journalist with whom they were in a relationship. It was later shown that the journalist, Nathan Grayson, had only written about Quinn once, before they started a relationship. These accusations sparked the harassment campaign known as Gamergate. Quinn suffered extensive harassment, including doxing, rape threats, and death threats. Media coverage of Gamergate resulted in widespread recognition of sexism in gaming.

According to The New Yorker, the harassment escalated to the point where Quinn left their home and began working with the authorities to identify those responsible for the harassment. Quinn detailed the experience in an interview on MSNBC's Ronan Farrow Daily, saying that Gamergate represented a rapidly shrinking fringe among an increasingly diverse gaming community, and that those attacking Quinn and women in gaming needed "to just grow up". Speaking with BBC News, Quinn said the harassment had consumed their life, leading them to feel as if "surrounded by nothing but hate – it's virulent, it's everywhere" and that they were "just trying to survive". The attacks boiled down to "the same accusation everybody makes toward every successful woman: she got to where she is because she had sex with someone", and Quinn also pointed out that Gamergate had targeted "the people with the least power in the industry". "[I] used to go to games events and feel like I was going home... Now it's just like... are any of the people I'm currently in the room with, the ones that said they wanted to beat me to death?" Quinn said that their therapist remarked of the harassment, "I don't even know what to tell you, this is so f-‍-‍-ing far outside anything I'm aware of."

In January 2015, Quinn co-founded Crash Override, a private network of experts to assist victims of online harassment which in March 2015 joined forces with Randi Harper's Online Abuse Prevention Initiative.

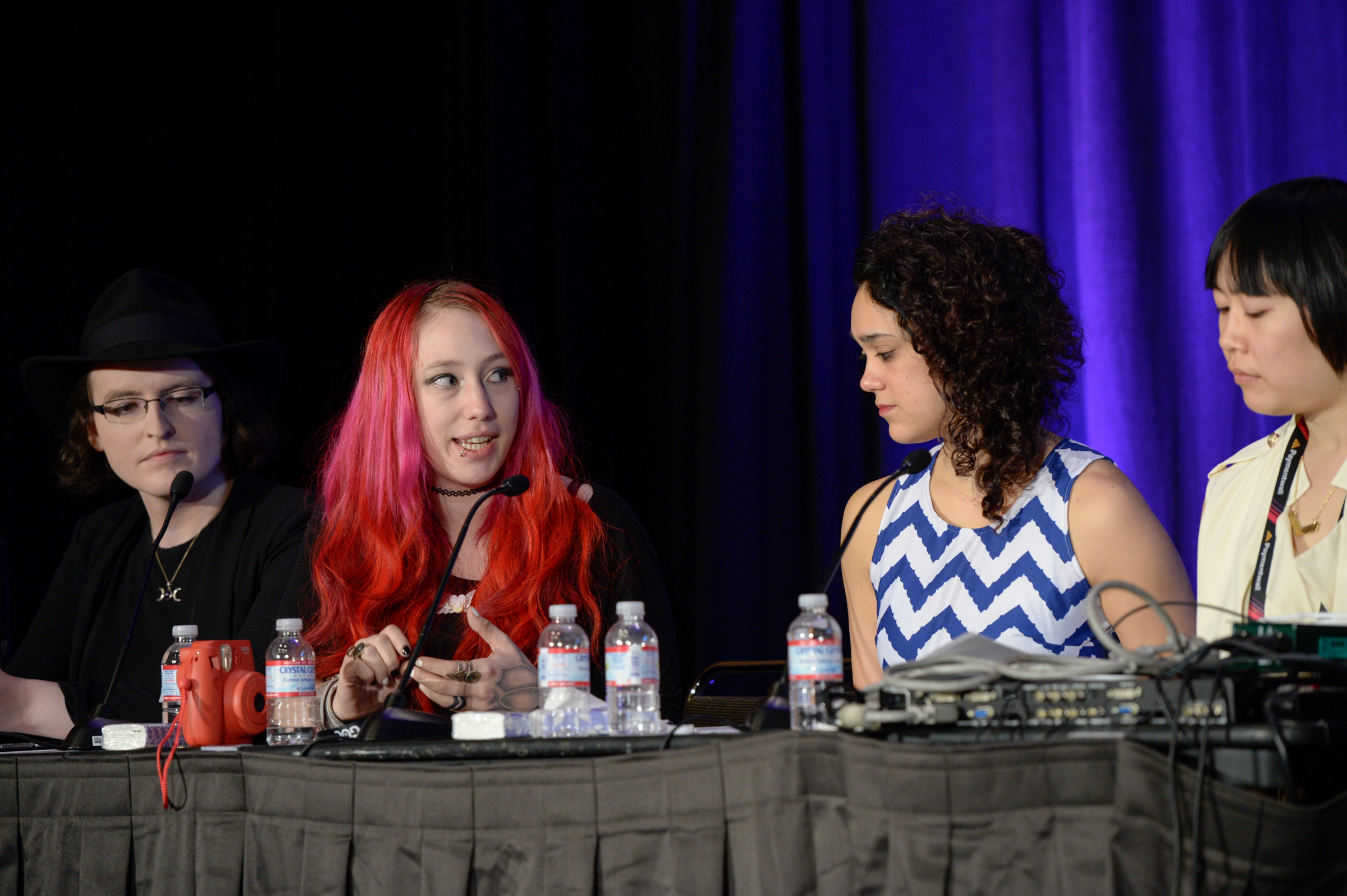
Quinn (second from the left) speaking at the Game Developers Conference in March 2016

On September 24, 2015, Quinn spoke at the United Nations along with Anita Sarkeesian about online harassment. In their speech, Quinn spoke about the need for technology companies to provide proper moderation and terms of service that protect marginalized groups. Quinn also raised concerns about providing better protections for transgender women and victims of domestic violence on the Internet. Quinn came out as non-cisgender in January 2017; they use they/them pronouns.

In September 2017, Quinn published the memoir Crash Override: How Gamergate (Nearly) Destroyed My Life, and How We Can Win the Fight Against Online Hate. The book has received generally positive reviews, with critics praising what they described as Quinn's thoughtful, nuanced portrayal of Quinn's harassers, but lamenting the book's "scattered" narrative flow. The book was nominated for the 2018 Hugo Award for Best Related Work (i.e., non-fiction work related to science fiction or fantasy).

== Bibliography ==
- Quinn, Zoë (2017). Crash Override: How Gamergate (Nearly) Destroyed My Life, and How We Can Win the Fight Against Online Hate. New York City, NY: PublicAffairs. ISBN 978-1610398084.
