= Caitlin Dewey =

American journalist

Caitlin Dewey Rainwater (née Dewey) is an American journalist, essayist and cultural commentator who runs the Links I Would G-Chat You If We Were Friends newsletter.

As of May 2024, she works as a freelance writer. She previously wrote for the Buffalo News, which she joined after leaving The Washington Post where she founded the paper's blog, The Intersect.

== Early life and education ==
Dewey grew up in Buffalo, New York. She graduated from the S. I. Newhouse School of Public Communications at Syracuse University, where she won The New York Times' 2012 "Modern Love: College Essay Contest".

== Career ==
Dewey writes for the Buffalo News and was formerly with The Washington Post where she founded the Post's blog the Intersect. She was also the food policy writer for Wonkblog, another Post blog. She wrote an 82-week column for the Post entitled "What Was Fake On The Internet This Week" (the blog ended in December 2015).

Her reporting on Gamergate, the harassment of women in the online gaming world, prompted a Congressional inquiry into the issue. She has won awards from, among other organizations, the Society of Features Journalism.

Dewey published a daily newsletter about Internet culture, Links I would GChat you if we were friends, from 2014 to 2016. The work was a Webby Award honoree in 2016. In 2020, during the COVID-19 pandemic, Dewey resurrected the newsletter as a weekly email.

== Personal life ==
Dewey is married to Jason Rainwater, whom she met online. After adopting a dual last name, she found that few people gave equal weight to both names.
