= Gamergate =

Misogynistic online harassment campaign

- Date: 2014–2015
- Target: Women in the video game industry
- Attack type: Online harassment campaign
- Victims: Zoë Quinn, Anita Sarkeesian, Brianna Wu, and others
- Perpetrators: Internet trolls, particularly from 4chan, IRC, and 8chan
- Motive: Misogyny; anti-feminism; anti-progressivism
- Inquiry: FBI investigation

Gamergate or GamerGate (GG) was a loosely organized misogynistic online harassment campaign motivated by a right-wing backlash against feminism, diversity, and progressivism in video game culture. It was conducted using the hashtag "#Gamergate" primarily in 2014 and 2015. (Note: Attributed to multiple references:) Gamergate primarily targeted women in the video game industry, most notably feminist media critic Anita Sarkeesian and video game developers Zoë Quinn and Brianna Wu. (Note: Attributed to multiple references:)

Gamergate began with an August 2014 blog entry by Quinn's ex-boyfriend, which falsely insinuated that Quinn had received a favorable review because of Quinn's sexual relationship with a games journalist. The blog post was spread to 4chan, where many users had disparaged Quinn's work. This led to a campaign of harassment against Quinn, coordinated through anonymous message boards such as 4chan, 8chan, and Reddit. The campaign expanded to target Sarkeesian, Wu, and others who defended Quinn, and included doxing, rape threats, and death threats.

Gamergate proponents ("Gamergaters") claimed to be promoting ethics in video game journalism and protecting the "gamer" identity in opposition to "political correctness" (Note: Attributed to multiple references:) and the perceived influence of feminism and "social justice warriors" on video game culture. Proponents alleged there was a conspiracy between journalists and developers to focus on progressive social issues such as gender equality and sexism. Such claims have been widely dismissed as trivial, baseless, or unrelated to actual issues of ethics in gaming and journalism. Several commentators in the mass media dismissed the complaints as a cover for the harassment. Gamergaters frequently denied any such harassment took place, falsely claiming it to be manufactured by the victims.

Gamergate has been described as a culture war over cultural diversification, artistic recognition, feminism in video games, social criticism in video games, and the social identity of gamers. (Note: Attributed to multiple references:) Supporters stated that it was a social movement. However, as a movement, Gamergate had no clearly defined goals, coherent message, or official leaders, making it difficult to define. Gamergate led figures both inside and outside the gaming industry to focus on methods of addressing online harassment, minimizing harm and preventing similar events. (Note: Attributed to multiple references:) Gamergate has been viewed as having contributed to the alt-right and other right-wing movements.

== History ==
=== Zoë Quinn and Depression Quest ===
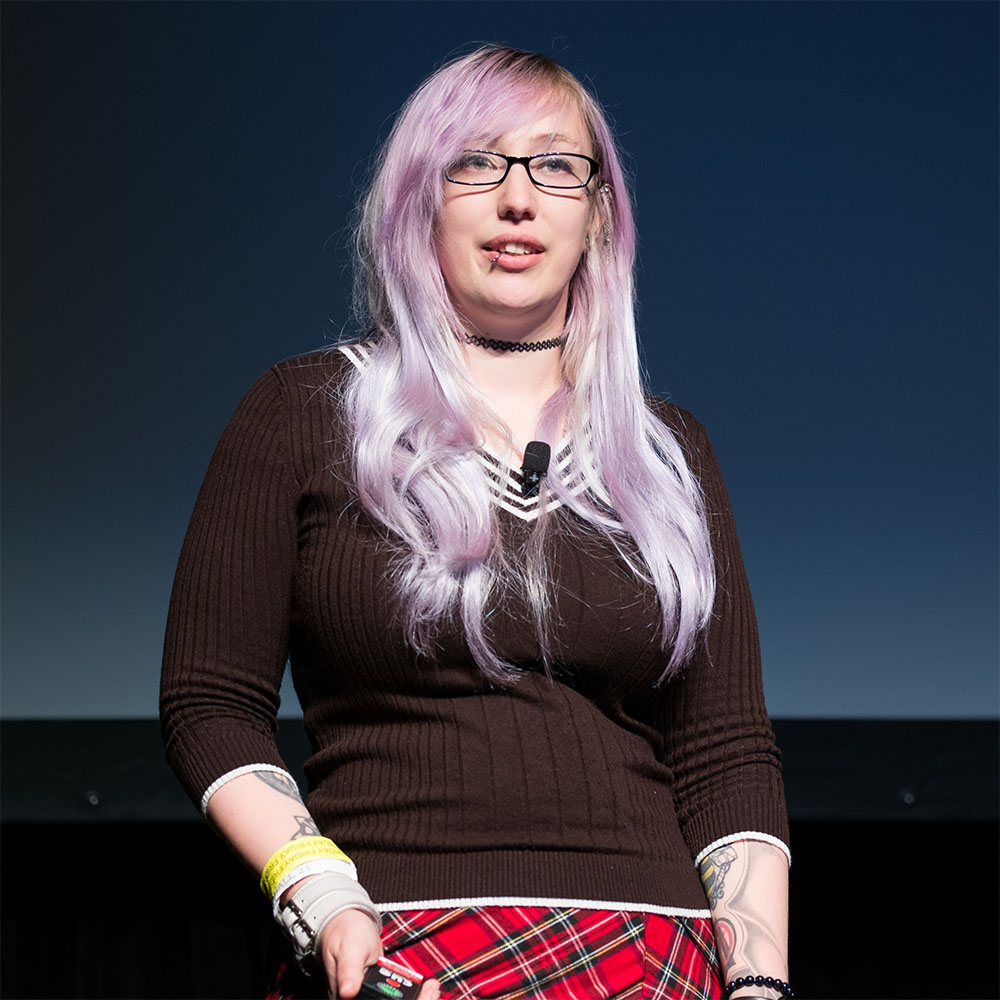
Game developer Zoë Quinn was the initial target of the harassment campaign.

In 2013, Zoë Quinn, an independent game developer, released Depression Quest, a text-focused game designed to convey the experience of depression through a series of fictional scenarios, based in part on Quinn's own experience with the illness. The game received positive reviews in the gaming media and from mental health professionals, but faced backlash online from gamers who disliked its departure from typical game formats emphasizing violence and skill and who opposed "political" intrusions into gamer culture. Quinn was subjected to several months of harassment after its release, including rape and death threats. Quinn documented the harassment they (Note: Quinn uses they/them pronouns.) received and spoke openly to the media about it, which led to more pronounced abuse against them such as the posting of their home address online. They cancelled future public appearances and ultimately fled their house out of fear for their safety.

The controversies and events that would come to be known as Gamergate began in August 2014 as a personal attack on Quinn, incited by a blog post by Quinn's former boyfriend, Eron Gjoni. Called "The Zoe Post", (Note: Gjoni initially published the post on the video-game sites Penny Arcade and Something Awful. After it was removed by the sites' moderators, Gjoni published "The Zoe Post" via the blogging platform WordPress.) it was a lengthy, detailed account of their relationship and breakup that included copies of personal chat logs, emails, and text messages. The blog falsely implied that Quinn received a favorable review of Depression Quest in exchange for a sexual relationship with Nathan Grayson, a reporter for the gaming websites Kotaku and Rock Paper Shotgun. Gjoni later said that he had "no evidence" of a sexual conflict of interest on Quinn's part. (Note: Gjoni later blamed the insinuation on a typographical error.) Grayson never actually reviewed any of Quinn's games, and his only Kotaku article mentioning them was published before their relationship began. Nonetheless, as reported by The Daily Dot, gamers online used Gjoni's blog to accuse Quinn, without evidence, of trading sex for professional advancement. A link to the blog was posted to 4chan, where many users had previously been highly critical of Depression Quest, which led to renewed attacks on Quinn.

After Gjoni's blog post, Quinn and their family were subjected to a virulent and often misogynistic harassment campaign. Online attackers of Quinn at first used the label "Quinnspiracy", later adopting the hashtag "#Gamergate" after it was coined by the actor Adam Baldwin on August 27, 2014, (Note: Baldwin, known for his right-wing political views, tweeted the hashtag #GamerGate near the end of August alongside a pair of videos promoting the "Quinnspiracy" by a YouTube user called Internet Aristocrat. He would later tell an interviewer that "leftists" were imposing "political crap" on gamers.) whose nearly 190,000 Twitter followers helped the spread of the hashtag. Right-wing journalist Milo Yiannopoulos popularized the hashtag on Breitbart News, becoming one of the most prominent voices of Gamergate and the antifeminist movement more broadly. Harassment of Gamergate targets was coordinated via IRC, spreading rapidly over imageboards and forums like 4chan and Reddit.

Less than four months after Gamergate began, Quinn's record of threats they had received had grown 1,000-fold. At a conference, Quinn said, "I used to go to game events and feel like I was going home ... Now it's just like ... are any of the people I'm currently in the room with ones that said they wanted to beat me to death?" One anonymous 4chan user threatened to give them "a crippling injury that's never going to fully heal". Commentators both inside and outside the video game industry condemned the attacks against Quinn. The attacks included doxing (researching and broadcasting personally identifiable information about an individual) and hacking of their Tumblr, Dropbox, and Skype accounts; they were again subjected to rape and death threats. Quinn again fled their home to stay with friends. Quinn wrote that "the Internet spent the last month spreading my personal information around, sending me threats, hacking anyone suspected of being friends with me, calling my dad and telling him I'm a whore, sending nude photos of me to colleagues, and basically giving me the 'burn the witch' treatment".

=== Anita Sarkeesian and Tropes vs. Women in Video Games ===
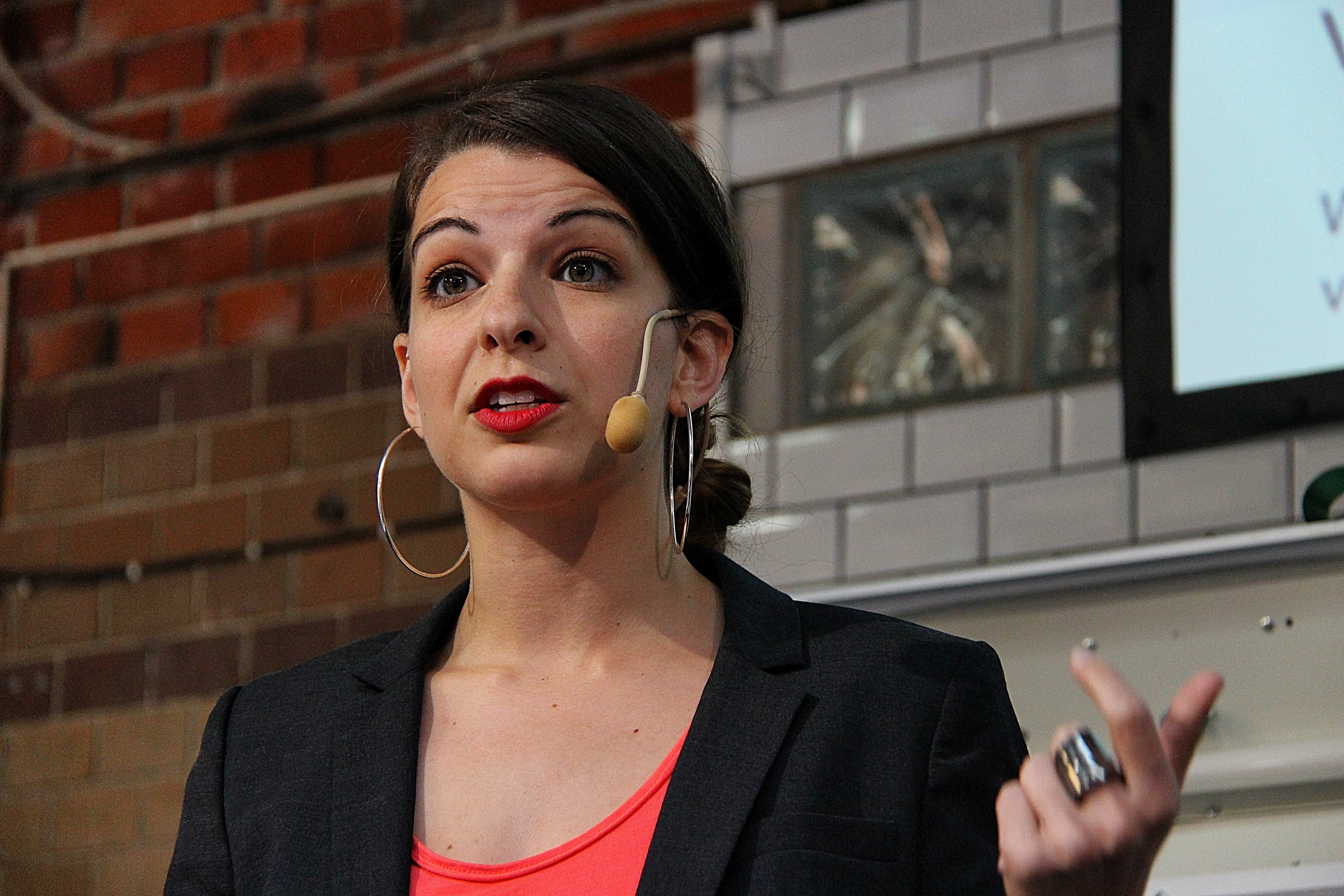
Feminist media critic Anita Sarkeesian received rape and death threats after releasing a video in her Tropes vs. Women in Video Games series.

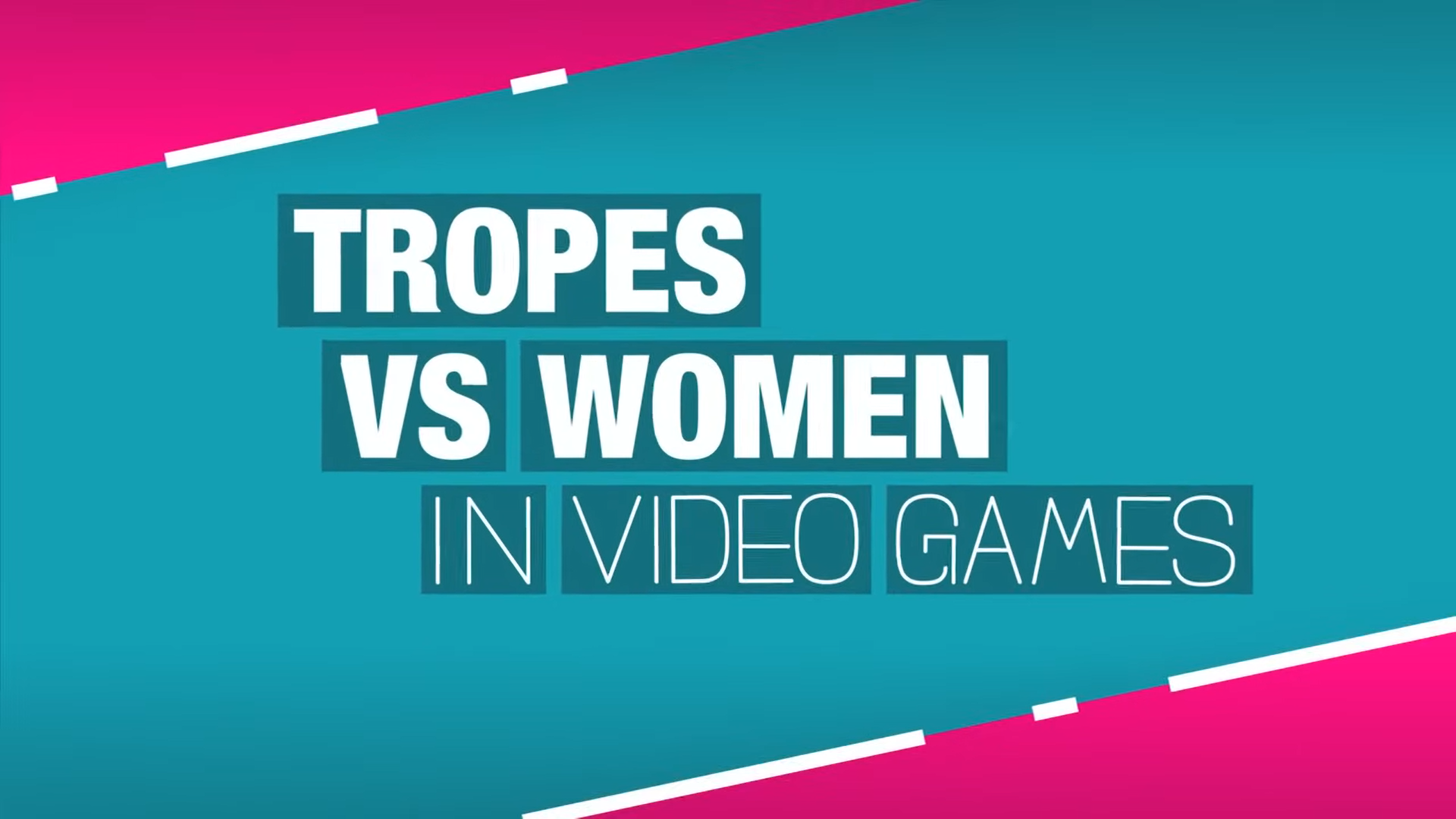
Title card used in the Tropes vs. Women in Video Games videos

Gamergate expanded to include renewed harassment of prominent feminist media critic Anita Sarkeesian, who had previously been a target of online harassment in 2012 due in part to her YouTube video series Tropes vs. Women in Video Games, which analyzes sexist portrayals of women. After a new episode of Tropes vs. Women was released on August 24, 2014, Sarkeesian received rape and death threats, and private information including her home address was leaked; she was compelled to flee her home. At the XOXO arts and technology conference in Portland, Oregon, she said, in regard to the accusations that high-profile women were making up the threats against them, that "one of the most radical things you can do is to actually believe women when they talk about their experiences". "The perpetrators", Sarkeesian went on to say, "do not see themselves as perpetrators at all ... They see themselves as noble warriors".

Sarkeesian canceled an October 2014 speaking appearance at Utah State University (USU) after the school received three anonymous threats, the second of which claimed affiliation with Gamergate. The initial threat proposed that "a Montreal Massacre style attack will be carried out against the attendees, as well as the students and staff at the nearby Women's Center", alluding to the École Polytechnique massacre, a 1989 mass shooting motivated by antifeminism. The threat also said that "I have at my disposal a semi-automatic rifle, multiple pistols, and a collection of pipe bombs". USU's president and provost released a joint statement saying that USU, in consultation with state and federal law enforcement agencies, had assessed that there was no credible threat to students, staff, or the speaker. Requests for additional security measures were declined because of Utah's open carry laws, leading to the cancellation. The threats drew the attention of mainstream media to the Gamergate situation. Nick Wingfield of The New York Times referred to the threat as "the most noxious example of a weeks long campaign to discredit or intimidate outspoken critics of the male-dominated gaming industry and its culture". The Federal Bureau of Investigation (FBI) investigated the threat to attack Sarkeesian and other Gamergate-related threats. The investigations, which were plagued with jurisdictional issues, ultimately closed with the FBI failing to identify the perpetrators of some threats and declining to prosecute others.

=== Brianna Wu ===
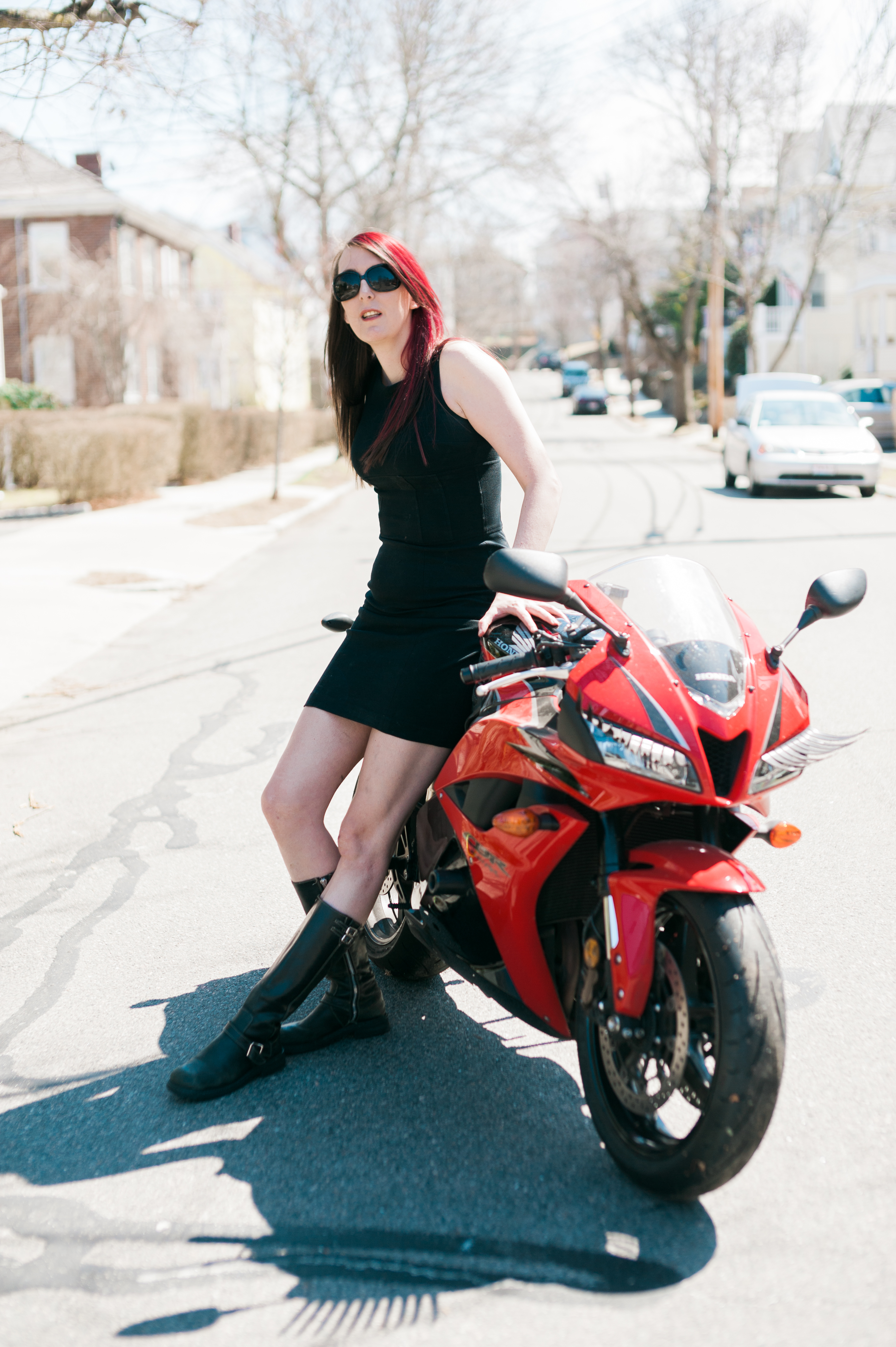
Video game developer Brianna Wu suffered Gamergate-related harassment beginning in October 2014.

In mid-October 2014, Brianna Wu, another independent game developer and co-founder of video game studio Giant Spacekat, saw her home address and other identifying information posted on 8chan as retaliation for mocking Gamergate. Wu then became the target of rape and death threats on Twitter and elsewhere. After contacting police, Wu fled her home with her husband, saying she would not allow the threats to intimidate her into silence. Wu announced a US$11,000 reward for information leading to a conviction for those involved in her harassment, and set up a legal fund to help other game developers who have been harassed online. As of April 2016, Wu was still receiving threats in such volume that she employed full-time staff to document them. In August 2021, The Washington Post described Wu as "a vocal proponent of forgiveness" for those harassers "who apologize and show they have grown" despite the extensive harassment she endured. However, "insults and continued harassment" still outnumbered apologies "10-to-1". As a result of the harassment, Wu said that she was diagnosed with post-traumatic stress disorder (PTSD).

=== Other targets of harassment ===
Gamergate supporters subjected others to similar harassment, doxing, and death threats. Those who came to the victims' defense were ridiculed as "white knights", or "social justice warriors" (SJWs); this characterization was intended, according to Heron, Belford and Goker, to neutralize any opposition by questioning their motives. The term "social justice warrior" emerged as the favored term of Gamergate proponents to refer to their opponents, resulting in its pejorative use becoming mainstream. Shortly after the Gamergate hashtag was coined, video game developer Phil Fish had his personal information, including various accounts and passwords, hacked and publicly posted in retaliation for defending Quinn and attacking their detractors. The hacks and doxing also exposed documents relating to Fish's company, Polytron. As a result, Fish left the gaming industry and put Polytron up for sale, calling the situation "unacceptable" and saying, "it's not worth it".

Harassment related to Gamergate continued for several months after the onset of the controversy. Two critics of Gamergate were targets of attempted "swatting"—hoaxed reports to emergency services intended to provoke a SWAT team response at the target's home. The Guardian reported that both swatting attempts were coordinated through the "baphomet" subforum of 8chan. After the initial rush of threats that caused her to flee her home, Wu documented receiving roughly 45 death threats by April 2015; Silicon Valley investor Marc Andreessen offered up to a $10,000 reward for information leading to the conviction of those who made the threats. Wu's studio, Giant Spacekat, withdrew from the Expo Hall of PAX East 2015. Wu cited security concerns, lack of confidence in the management and their failure to return calls.

Actress and gamer Felicia Day wrote a blog post about her concerns over Gamergate and her fear of retaliation if she spoke against it. Almost immediately her home address and phone number were posted online, leading to harassing letters and phone calls. Actor Wil Wheaton and former NFL player Chris Kluwe also posted criticisms of Gamergate. Stephen Colbert questioned why men like Kluwe had not been threatened by Gamergate, noting that the targets were almost entirely women.

=== Coordination of harassment ===
8chan was a central hub for Gamergate supporters after 4chan banned discussion of Gamergate. The website later became associated with far-right groups.

Gamergate's harassment was coordinated primarily through anonymous message boards such as 4chan, 8chan, and Reddit, particularly the "KotakuInAction" (KiA) subreddit. Ars Technica reported that a series of 4chan discussion logs suggests that Twitter sockpuppet accounts were used to popularize the Gamergate hashtag. Early Gamergate internet relay chat (IRC) discussions focused on coordinating the harassment of Quinn by using astroturf campaigns to push attacks against her into mainstream view, while initial organizers attempted to cultivate a palatable narrative for public consumption, internally focusing on personal grudges against Quinn and aggressive sexual imagery. Gamergaters circulated a blacklist of publications along with email templates and phone scripts to use in lobbying companies to pull advertisements from sites critical of Gamergate. Media scholar Torill Mortensen wrote in Games and Culture that Gamergate's structure as an anonymous swarm allowed it to create an environment where anyone who criticized it or became its target was at risk, while allowing them to avoid individual responsibility for harassment.

There has been considerable discussion of self-policing and the responsibility supporters of Gamergate share when the hashtag is used for harassment. A number of websites have blocked users, removed posts, and created policies to prevent their users from threatening Quinn and others with doxing, assault, rape and murder, and planning and coordinating such threats. In September 2014, 4chan founder and then-head administrator Christopher Poole banned all discussion of Gamergate on the site as more attacks occurred, leading to Gamergate supporters using 8chan as their central hub.

Many Gamergate supporters have denied that the harassment took place, or falsely accused victims of fabricating the evidence. Gamergate supporters have used the term "Literally Who" to refer to victims of harassment such as Quinn, saying they are not relevant to Gamergate's goals and purposes. Several commentators have decried the use of such terminology as dehumanizing and said that discussions on Gamergate forums often focus on those referred to as "Literally Who".

By September 24, 2014, over one million Twitter messages incorporating the Gamergate hashtag had been sent. A Newsweek and Brandwatch analysis found more than two million Twitter messages between September and October 2014. Software developer Andy Baio also produced an analysis of #Gamergate tweets showing a discussion that was polarized between pro- and anti-Gamergate factions. One quarter of the tweets sampled were produced by users new to Twitter, most of whom were pro-Gamergate.

== Demographics ==
While the number of Gamergate supporters is unclear, in October 2014, Deadspin estimated 10,000 supporters based on the number of users discussing Gamergate on Reddit.

Katherine Cross, a sociologist, game critic and target of harassment from Gamergate, noted that "For a long time, Gamergate adamantly resisted that [far right] characterization", adding that "They said that notions that they were conservatives were slander and dismissed them. They posted straw polls that they've taken in KiA that demonstrate this. I've said time and time again that that largely means nothing." Vice News noted that "The obvious problem here is that th[ese are] unscientific internet poll[s], which can be easily gamed by a community that often games polls." and that "the threads on [r/KotakuinAction] tell a different story. On February 8, for example, all the off-topic threads had a clear, far-right bent, claiming that Facebook is censoring crimes committed by immigrants, complaining about college professors who criticize Trump, and more. In the eyes of Gamergaters fighting against 'political correctness' doesn't necessarily conflict with liberal politics, but I also couldn't find any threads that could be construed as liberal." Vice News also noted that "while the majority of Gamergaters resent the affiliation [of alt-right], many of the movement's leading figures, who were right wing pundits before Gamergate, have graduated from rallying against political correctness in games to supporting Trump and the alt-right.", including Mike Cernovich and Milo Yiannopoulos.

== Organization ==
The series of events that came to be known as Gamergate has been described as "torturously complex". As a movement, it had no official leaders or clearly defined agenda. Because of its anonymous membership, lack of organization and leaderless nature, sources differ as to the goals or mission of Gamergate and defining it has been difficult. Frank Lantz of NYU's Game Center wrote that he could not find "a single explanation of a coherent Gamergate position". Christopher Grant, editor-in-chief of Polygon, told the Columbia Journalism Review: "The closest thing we've been able to divine is that it's noise. It's chaos ... all you can do is find patterns. And ultimately Gamergate will be defined—I think has been defined—by some of its basest elements."

The decentralized nature of Gamergate allowed it to defy attempts at discourse and to define its agenda. This decentralization allowed for a long-term, focused campaign against consistent targets. Kyle Wagner of Deadspin argues that "By design, Gamergate is nearly impossible to define. It refers, variously, to a set of incomprehensible Benghazi-type conspiracy theories about game developers and journalists; to a fairly broad group of gamers concerned with corruption in gaming journalism; to a somewhat narrower group of gamers who believe women should be punished for having sex; and, finally, to a small group of gamers conducting organized campaigns of stalking and harassment against women." and that "This ambiguity is useful, because it turns any discussion of this subject into a debate over semantics." Wagner describes Gamergate as "a fascinating glimpse of the future of grievance politics".

As the threats expanded, international media focused on Gamergate's violent, misogynistic element and its inability to present a coherent message. Bob Stuart, in The Daily Telegraph, reported that "Gamergate has since swelled into an unwieldy movement with no apparent leaders, mission statement, or aims beyond calling out 'social justice warriors'. ... When members of the games industry are being driven from their houses and jobs, threatened, or abused, it makes Gamergate's claim that it is engaged in an ethical campaign appear laughable." The campaign's focus broadened to take on other targets in the news media, as with Hulk Hogan's lawsuit against Gawker Media.

Jesse Singal, in New York, stated that he had spoken to several Gamergate supporters to try to understand their concerns, but found conflicting ideals and incoherent messages. Singal observed Gamergate supporters making a constant series of attacks on Quinn, Sarkeesian, and other people, while frequently stating that Gamergate "is not about" them. Chris Ip of the Columbia Journalism Review said that Gamergate supporters espousing critiques of ethics in journalism could not be separated from harassers. With anyone able to tweet under the hashtag and no single person willing or able to represent the hashtag and take responsibility for its actions, Ip said it is not possible for journalists to neatly separate abusers from those seeking reasonable debate.

Jon Stone, as quoted in The Week, said that "[Gamergate] readjusts and reinvents itself in response to attempts to disarm and disperse its noxiousness, subsuming disaffected voices in an act of continual regeneration, cycling through targets, pretexts, manifestoes, and moralisms". Polygon's Grant said that as of October 2014, Gamergate had remained amorphous and leaderless so that the harassment can be conducted without any culpability.

Gamergaters attacked gaming websites that criticized Gamergate and gaming websites that expressed support for diversity in gaming culture, including Kotaku, Game Developer, Ars Technica, Polygon, and Gawker.

=== Harassment and Twitter ===
While organized through anonymous message boards such as 4chan and Reddit, Gamergate harassment was most prominent on Twitter. Michael Salter, then a University of Western Sydney criminologist, writes that Twitter's design and architecture was "highly conducive" to such abuse campaigns, allowing Gamergaters to overwhelm users' ability to individually block the large numbers of fake or "sockpuppet" accounts used to send abusive and harassing messages.

Twitter was criticized for its inability to respond quickly and prevent harassment over the service. Within the United States, Twitter and other social media sites are not liable for content posted by third-parties of their service under Section 230 of the Communications Decency Act (1996), and so have no legal obligation to police malicious content such as harassment and threats. Brianna Wu, shortly after becoming a target of harassment, stated that Twitter facilitated harassment by the ease with which anyone could make a new account even after having an earlier account blocked, and challenged the service to improve its responsiveness to complaints. Robinson Meyer of The Atlantic said Gamergate is an "identity crisis" for Twitter, and by not dealing with harassing users, the platform is failing to protect victims.

Early on during Gamergate, software developer Randi Harper started the "Good Game Auto Blocker" or "ggautoblocker", an expanding list of known Twitter accounts that were tied to the Gamergate hashtag which could be automatically blocked, therefore reducing the degree of harassment received. In November 2014, Twitter announced a collaboration with the non-profit group "Women, Action & the Media" (WAM), in which users of Twitter can report harassment to a tool monitored by WAM members, who would forward affirmed issues to Twitter within 24 hours. The move, while arising in the wake of the Gamergate harassment, was due to general issues of the harassment of women on the Internet. In May 2015, WAM reported that of 512 reported harassment instances by the tool during the month of November 2014, 12% of those were tied to the Gamergate controversy based on the ggautoblocker list, with most harassment occurring from single-instance accounts targeting a single person.

=== Efforts to affect public perceptions ===
4chan users designed the character Vivian James to be used in the winning entry of TFYC's game design competition; her striped sweatshirt is a reference to a visual rape joke that became a viral 4chan meme.

Early in the controversy, posters on 4chan focused on donating to a group called The Fine Young Capitalists (TFYC), which had been embroiled in a dispute with Quinn over a women-only game development contest that Quinn had organized. TFYC sponsored a video game design contest for women in 2014. They were created by a partnership between Colombian media developer Autobótika and Canadian organization Empowered Up. It was founded with the goal of helping women and other underrepresented groups get involved in video game design. Its founder is Matthew Rappard, who is the only member who is publicly identified.

Advocating donations to help TFYC create the game, posters on 4chan's politics board argued that such donations would make them "look really good" and would make them "PR-untouchable". For their donations, TFYC allowed 4chan to create a character to be included in the game. The result was "Vivian James", a character designed to appear like an ordinary female gamer; her name is meant to sound like "video games". The colors of her striped purple and green hooded sweatshirt represent a viral 4chan meme known as "daily dose", which depicted a character from the anime Dragon Ball Z sexually assaulting another character. Allegra Ringo of Vice called her "a character masquerading as a feminist icon for the express purpose of spiting feminists".

To respond to widespread criticism of Gamergate as misogynistic, posters on 4chan created a second Twitter hashtag, #NotYourShield, intended to show that Gamergate was not about opposition to feminism or wanting to push women out of gaming. Many of the accounts used to tweet the tag were sockpuppets that had copied their avatars from elsewhere on the Internet; the methods used to create it have been compared to #EndFathersDay, a hoax manufactured on 4chan using similar methods. Quinn said that in light of Gamergate's exclusive targeting of women or those who stood up for women, "#notyourshield was, ironically, solely designed to be a shield for this campaign once people started calling it misogynistic". Arthur Chu wrote that the hashtag was an attempt to discourage allies from supporting the people being attacked by Gamergate.

=== Targeting advertisers ===
Gamergate supporters were critical of the wave of articles calling for diversity that followed the initial outbreak of the controversy, interpreting them as an attack on games and gamer culture. Gamergaters responded with a coordinated email campaign that demanded advertisers drop several involved publications; in a five-step 'war plan' against organizations that offended them, a Gamergate posting described how they would choose from a list of target organizations, pick a grievance from a list others had compiled, and send a form letter containing it to an advertiser. Intel reacted to this by withdrawing an ad campaign from Game Developer in October 2014. After a number of game developers criticized Intel for this, arguing that it could have a chilling effect on free speech and that it amounted to supporting harassment, Intel apologized, ultimately resuming advertising on Game Developer in mid-November.

=== Sad Puppies ===
Gamergate became associated with the "Sad Puppies" and "Rabid Puppies" during 2015 Hugo Awards for science fiction writing. These groups organized voting blocs to promote overlapping slates that dominated the 2015 Hugo Award nominations, though they failed to win the awards. The campaign was described as a backlash against the increasing racial, ethnic, and gender diversity in science fiction. Members of the blocs said that they sought to counteract what they asserted was a focus on giving awards based on the race, ethnicity, or gender of the author or characters rather than quality, and bemoaning the increasing prominence of what they described as 'message' fiction with fewer traditional "zap gun" science-fictional trappings. By 2018, the Sad Puppies had diminished visibility, and Quinn's 2017 memoir Crash Override was nominated for the 2018 Hugo Award for Best Related Work (for non-fiction works related to science fiction or fantasy).

== Purpose and goals ==
The most active Gamergate supporters or "Gamergaters" said that Gamergate was a movement for ethics in games journalism, for protecting the "gamer" identity, and for opposing "political correctness" in video games and that any harassment of women was done by others not affiliated with Gamergate. (Note: Attributed to multiple references:) They argued that the close relationships between journalists and developers demonstrated a conspiracy among reviewers to focus on progressive social issues. These conspiracy theories particularly focused on the positive reception to games such as Depression Quest and Gone Home, which feature unconventional gameplay and stories with social implications.

Observers in the media have largely rejected these claims as baseless and malicious. Chris Ip of the Columbia Journalism Review wrote that "many criticisms of press coverage by people who identify with Gamergate ... have been debunked" and concluded that "at core, the movement is a classic culture war". Writing in Vox, Emily VanDerWerff said that "[e]very single question of journalistic ethics Gamergate has brought up has either been debunked or dealt with". According to Leigh Alexander, then editor-at-large of Game Developer, the ethics concerns were a conspiracy theory, albeit a sincere one; Alexander writes that there is nothing unethical about journalists being acquainted with those they cover and that meaningful reporting requires journalists to develop professional relationships with sources. Ars Technica, Vox, and Wired, among others, stated that discussions of gender equality, sexism and other social issues in game reviews present no ethical conflict. (Note: Attributed to multiple references:)

Several writers who attempted to understand Gamergate's motivations concluded that, rather than relating to purported issues with gaming journalism ethics, Gamergate represented an effort to suppress opposing views. Salter writes that "mass media had a decisive role in evaluating the competing claims of Gamergate and its critics, and ultimately dismissing Gamergate as a misogynist abuse campaign". Screenshots of 4chan boards, collected and published by Quinn, suggested that complaints about ethics in games journalism were invented post hoc by Gamergaters to distract critics from their ongoing abuse of Quinn. Jay Hathaway wrote at Gawker that this strategy emerged once Gamergaters found that harassing Quinn about their sexual history was unlikely to win the campaign support; according to Hathaway, IRC chat logs showed that "the [Gamergate] movement was focused on destroying Zoë Quinn first, reforming games reporting second".

Other commentators argued that Gamergate had the potential to raise significant issues in gaming journalism, but that the wave of misogynistic harassment and abuse associated with the hashtag had poisoned the well, making it impossible to separate honest criticism from sexist trolling. Visible support for Gamergate in the form of tweets, online videos, and blogs seldom involved discussion of ethics, but often featured misogynistic or racist commentary. The targets were mainly female game developers, academics, and writers.

Researchers at the Berkman Center for Internet & Society at Harvard University described Gamergate as a "vitriolic campaign against Quinn that quickly morph[ed] into a broader crusade against alleged corruption in games journalism" which involved considerable abuse and harassment of female developers and game critics. Concerns have also been raised when juxtaposing the behavior of Gamergate supporters with their claimed message. Dr. Kathleen Bartzen Culver, a professor and media ethics expert at the University of Wisconsin–Madison, wrote that while Gamergate supporters claimed to be interested in journalism ethics, their "misogynistic and threatening" behavior belied this claim. "Much of the conversation—if I can even call it that—has been a toxic sludge of rumor, invective, and gender bias. The irony comes from people who claim to be challenging the ethics of game journalists through patently unethical behavior."

After analyzing a sample of tweets related to Gamergate, Newsweek concluded that it was primarily about harassment rather than ethics, stating that the sample "suggests that ... contrary to its stated goal, Gamergate spends more time tweeting negatively at game developers than at game journalists". Casey Johnston wrote for Ars Technica that, based on logs from the 4chan users who initially pushed Gamergate into the spotlight, the goal behind the hashtag campaign was to "perpetuate misogynistic attacks by wrapping them in a debate about ethics". An academic analysis of a week's worth of public posts tagged with #Gamergate found that the issue publics involved were not "only or even primarily" concerned with ethics in gaming journalism.

In an interview with Anita Sarkeesian in The Guardian, Jessica Valenti said that "the movement's much-mocked mantra, 'It's about ethics in journalism'" was seen by others as "a natural extension of sexist harassment and the fear of female encroachment on a traditionally male space". Sarkeesian asked, "if this 'movement' was about journalism, why wasn't it journalists who had to deal with a barrage of rape and death threats?" Wu told The Boston Globe that the ethics claims were "a pretext" and described Gamergate as "an actual hate group ... they're upset and threatened by women who are being very outspoken about feminism".

Gamergate has been criticized for focusing on women, especially female developers, while ignoring many large-scale journalistic ethics issues. Alex Goldman of NPR's On the Media criticized Gamergate for targeting female independent ("indie") developers rather than AAA games publishers, and said claims of unethical behavior by Quinn and Sarkeesian were unfounded. In Wired, Laura Hudson found it telling that Gamergate supporters concentrated on impoverished independent creators and critics, and nearly exclusively women, rather than the large game companies whose work they enjoyed. Vox writer Emily VanDerWerff highlighted an essay written by game developer David Hill, who said that corruption, nepotism, and excessive commercialism existed in the gaming industry, but that Gamergate was not addressing those issues. Adi Robertson, of The Verge, commented on the long-standing ethical issues gaming journalism has dealt with, but that most Gamergate supporters did not seem interested in "addressing problems that don't directly relate to feminist criticism or the tiny indie games scene".

Feminist Media Studies described Gamergate as "a convenient way for a loose coalition of frustrated geeks, misogynists, alt-righters, and trolls to coalesce around a common idea—that popular culture was 'overly concerned' with a particular kind of identity politics—even if their tactics and actual motivations for participating were varied."

== Social, cultural, and political impact ==
Observers have generally described Gamergate as part of a long-running culture war against efforts to diversify the traditionally male video gaming community, particularly targeting outspoken women. They cite Gamergate supporters' frequent harassment of female figures in the gaming industry and its overt hostility toward people involved in social criticism and analysis of video games. The Washington Post's digital culture writer Caitlin Dewey said that "Whatever Gamergate may have started as, it is now an Internet culture war" between predominantly female game developers and critics advocating for greater inclusion, and "a motley alliance of vitriolic naysayers" opposed to such changes. Vox said that Gamergate supporters were less interested in criticizing ethical issues than in opposition to social criticism and analysis of video games and in harassment of prominent women. Ars Technica quoted early members as saying that they had no interest in video games and were primarily interested in attacking Quinn.

Gamergate has been described as being driven by antifeminist ideologies. Some supporters have denied this, but acknowledge that there are misogynistic voices within Gamergate. Antonsen, Ask, and Karlstrom wrote in Nordic Journal of Science and Technology Studies "in the case of #gamergate, it is the explicit goal of many of the participants to exclude groups of people, particularly women, from the debate and from the game industry and limit women's rights as citizens." Jon Stone, writing in The Guardian, called it a "swelling of vicious right-wing sentiment". Commentators such as Stone, Liana Kerzner, and Ryan Cooper have said that the controversy is being exploited by right-wing voices and by conservative pundits who had little interest in gaming. Chrisella Herzog states that in addition to violent sexism, Gamergate has virulent strains and violent sentiments of homophobia, transphobia, anti-Semitism, racism, and neo-Nazism. Gamergate supporters also promoted the Cultural Marxism conspiracy theory.

Quinn said the campaign had "roped well-meaning people who cared about ethics and transparency into a pre-existing hate mob", and urged industry publishers and developers to condemn the hashtag. They further asked those Gamergate supporters who had any earnest discussion about ethics to move away from the "Gamergate" tag.

=== Gamer identity ===
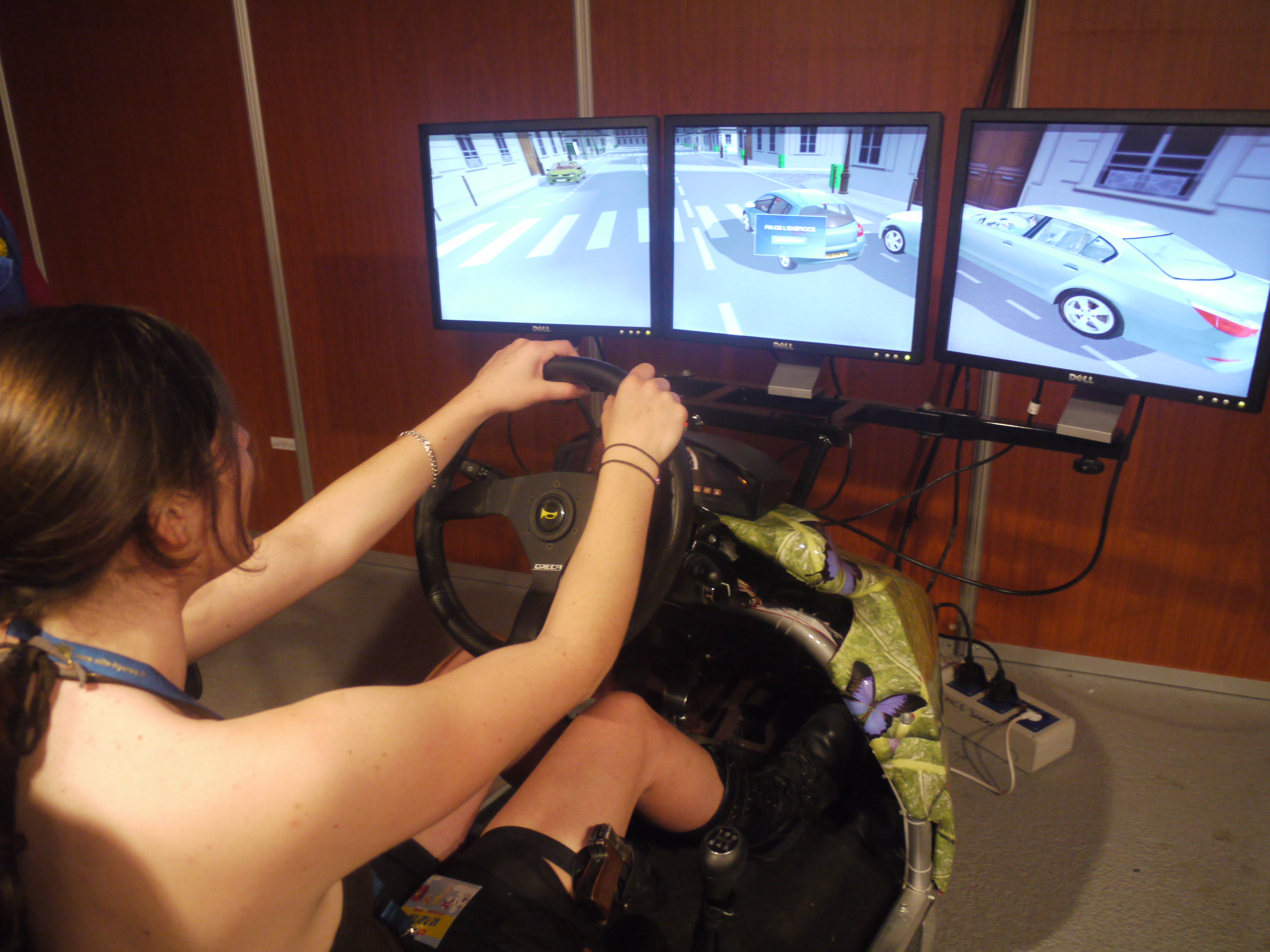
A woman playing Go Play One in 2010

Gamergate is often considered to be a reaction to the changing cultural identity of the "gamer". As video games grew in mainstream popularity during the 1990s, a "gamer" identity emerged among predominantly young, male, heterosexual players, and the types of games designed to appeal to them. Over the years, the growing popularity of games expanded that audience to include many who did not fit the traditional gamer demographic, particularly women. Games with artistic and cultural themes grew in popularity, and independent video game development made these games more common, while mobile and casual games expanded the scope of the industry beyond the traditional gamer identity. The games most popular with typical "gamers", often featuring explicit violence along with exaggerated gender stereotypes, were joined by a more diverse set of games that included gay, lesbian, and transgender themes. "Indie" gaming blogs and websites were created to comment on these developments, in contrast to the more established gaming press, which was traditionally dependent on the games industry itself.

The media-studies scholar Adrienne Massanari writes that Gamergate is a direct response to such changes in video-game content as well as changes in the demographics of players. Surveys by the Entertainment Software Association in 2014 and 2015 showed that video-game players were between 44% and 48% female, with an average age of thirty-five. This broader audience began to question some assumptions and tropes that had been common in games. Shira Chess and Adrienne Shaw write that concern over these changes is integral to Gamergate, especially a fear that sexualized games aimed primarily at young men might eventually be replaced by less sexualized games marketed to broader audiences. Gamergaters often dismiss such games and their more diverse, casual group of players as being not "real" games or gamers. Alyssa Rosenberg of The Washington Post said that some of Gamergaters' concerns were rooted in a view of video games as "appliances" rather than art, that should be reviewed based on feature checklists rather than traditional artistic criteria. Chris Suellentrop of The New York Times criticized resistance to innovative uses of the gaming medium, and the belief that increased coverage and praise of artistic games like Gone Home would negatively affect blockbuster games such as Grand Theft Auto V.

Gamergate is particularly associated with opposition to the influence of so-called social justice warriors in the gaming industry and media, who are perceived as a threat to traditional gaming culture. As the video-game market grew more diverse, cultural critics became interested in issues of gender representation and identity in games. One prominent feminist critic of the representation of women in gaming is Anita Sarkeesian, whose Tropes vs. Women in Video Games project is devoted to female stereotypes in games. Her fundraising campaign and videos were met with hostility and harassment by some gamers. Further incidents raised concerns about sexism in video gaming. Prior to August 2014, escalating harassment prompted the International Game Developers Association (IGDA) to provide support groups for harassed developers and to begin discussions with the FBI to help investigate online harassment of game developers. In an interview on Comedy Central's program The Colbert Report, Sarkeesian said she believes women are targeted because they are "challenging the status quo of gaming as a male-dominated space".

In late August 2014, shortly after the initial accusations against Grayson and harassment of Quinn, several gaming sites published opinion essays on the controversy that focused on the growing diversity of gaming and the mainstreaming of the medium, some of which included criticism of sexism within gamer culture. These so-called "gamers are dead" articles were seen as part of a conspiracy to undercut traditional gamer identity and were used by participants to rally support for Gamergate. One of these articles, published on Game Developer and written by Leigh Alexander, was titled "'Gamers' don't have to be your audience. 'Gamers' are over". Writing for Paste, L. Rhodes said the antagonism in the Gamergate controversy was a result of the industry seeking to widen its customer demographic instead of focusing on core gamers, which Rhodes says "is precisely what videogames needed". Brendan Keogh of Overland stated that Gamergate "does not represent a marginalised, discriminated identity under attack so much as a hegemonic and normative mainstream being forced to redistribute some of its power".

=== Misogyny and sexism ===
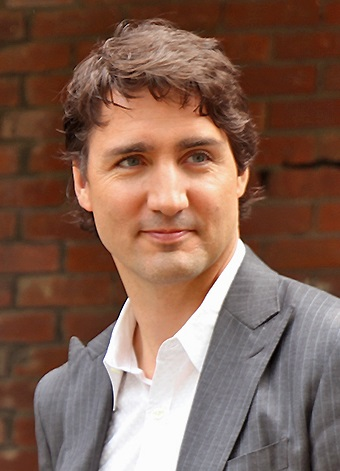
Prime Minister of Canada Justin Trudeau condemned Gamergate and misogyny in video games.

Gamergate has been described as an expression of sexism and misogyny within gaming culture; its main themes are opposition to feminism and so-called "social justice warriors", who are perceived as a threat to traditional video games. Women's greater visibility in the gaming industry has seen a corresponding rise in gendered harassment and intimidation directed at them. Among mainstream journalists, the harassment campaign that became known as Gamergate is considered emblematic of this surge of online misogyny. According to Sarah Kaplan of The Washington Post, "sexism in gaming is a long-documented, much-debated but seemingly intractable problem", and became the crux of the Gamergate controversy. Jaime Weinman, writing in Maclean's, said, "[w]hether it was supposed to be or not, GamerGate is largely about women". Discussing Gamergate on her ESPN blog, Jane McManus compared the misogyny that women in the gaming industry experience to that faced by the first women entering sporting communities. In October 2015, Canadian Prime Minister Justin Trudeau described issues like Gamergate and misogyny in video games as "something that we need to stand clearly against".

Sexism and misogyny had been identified as problems in the video game industry and online community prior to the events of Gamergate. Sarkeesian considered that the Internet has a "boys'-locker-room feel" to it, with male users trying to show off to each other which causes escalating cases of harassment in situations like Gamergate. In March 2014, game designer Cliff Bleszinski wrote a blog post commenting on the "latent racism, homophobia and misogyny" that existed within the online gaming community. In a November 2014 interview with Develop, Wu said the game industry "has been a boys' club for 30 years", and that the common portrayal of women as "sex symbols and damsels in distress" in video games has led to the players taking the same attitudes. Brendan Sinclair, writing for GamesIndustry.biz, stated that the events of the Gamergate controversy were "reprehensible and saddening" and "this industry has some profound issues in the way it treats women".

Many commentators have said that the harassment associated with Gamergate springs from this existing well of deep-seated misogyny, and that it was merely brought to the fore by the anonymity of the Internet. Lisa Nakamura, a professor of digital studies at the University of Michigan, wrote that Gamergate "showed the world the extent of gaming's misogyny". In an interview with the BBC, Quinn stated that "[b]efore [Gamergate] had a name, it was nothing but trying to get me to kill myself, trying to get people to hurt me, going after my family. ... There is no mention of ethics in journalism at all outside of making the same accusation everybody makes towards any successful woman; that clearly she got to where she is because she had sex with someone." Danielle Citron of the University of Maryland wrote that the intent of this type of harassment is to demean the victim, make them doubt their own integrity, and to redefine the victim's identity in order to "fundamentally distort who she is".

Targets of Gamergate supporters have overwhelmingly been women, even when men were responsible for the supposed wrongdoings. Writing in The New Yorker, Simon Parkin observed that Quinn was attacked while the male journalist who was falsely accused of reviewing their work favorably largely escaped, revealing the campaign as "a pretense to make further harassment of women in the industry permissible". In The New York Times, Chris Suellentrop said that a petition sought to have a female colleague fired for criticizing the portrayal of women in Grand Theft Auto V, while he and many other male critics raised similar concerns but did not face similar reprisals. Most commentators have described Gamergate as consisting largely of white males, though some supporters have said that it includes a notable percentage of women, minorities and LGBT members.

Critics of the movement have described it as a kind of misogynistic terrorism. Writing in The Week, Ryan Cooper called the harassment campaign "an online form of terrorism" intended to reverse a trend in gaming culture toward increasing acceptance of women, and stated that social media platforms need to tighten their policies and protections against threats and abuse. Speaking on Iowa Public Radio, academic Cindy Tekobbe said the harassment campaign was intended to drive women from public spaces and intimidate them into silence. Prof. Joanne St. Lewis of the University of Ottawa stated that Gamergate's harassment and threats should be considered acts of terrorism as the perpetrators seek to harm women and to prevent them from speaking back or defending others.

=== Law enforcement ===
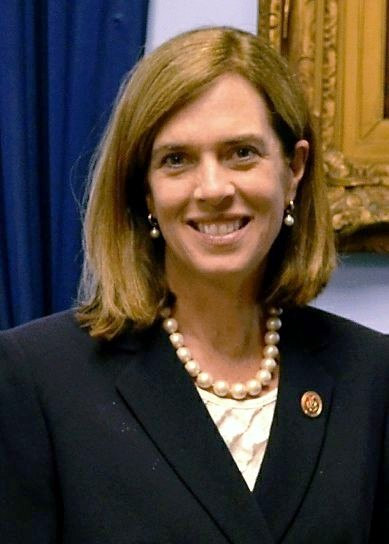
Katherine Clark, the U.S. Congresswoman from Massachusetts' 5th District, sought to expand the FBI's ability to take action against cyberharassment similar to that faced by Wu.

Though Newsweek reported that the FBI had a file regarding Gamergate, no arrests have been made nor charges filed, and parts of the FBI investigation into the threats had been closed in September 2015 due to a lack of leads. Former FBI supervisory special agent for cybercrimes, Tim Ryan, stated that cyberharassment cases are a low priority for authorities because it is difficult to track down the perpetrator and they have lower penalties compared to other crimes they are tasked to enforce. In June 2015, the US Supreme Court ruled in Elonis v. United States that harassing messages sent online are not necessarily true threats that would be prosecutable under criminal law and, according to Pacific Standard, this poses a further challenge in policing Gamergate-related harassment. However, the Court's decision also suggested that if threats made over social media were found to be true threats, they should be treated the same as threats made in other forms of communication.

Wu has expressed her frustration over how law enforcement agencies have responded to the threats that she and other women in the game industry have received. On public release of the FBI's case files on Gamergate, Wu said she was "livid", and that "Only a fraction of information we gave the FBI was looked into. They failed on all levels." The lack of legal enforcement contributes towards the harassers' ability to maintain these activities without any risk of punishment, according to Chrisella Herzog of The Diplomatic Courier; at worst, harassers would see their social media accounts suspended but are able to turn around to register new accounts to continue to engage.

U.S. Representative Katherine Clark, one of whose constituents was Brianna Wu, called for a stronger response from law enforcement to online abuse, partly as a result of advocacy by the women targeted by Gamergate. On March 10, 2015, Clark wrote a letter to the House Appropriations Committee asking it to call on the Justice Department to crack down on the harassment of women on the internet, saying the campaign of intimidation associated with Gamergate had highlighted the problem. She asked the U.S. Department of Justice to "prioritize" online threats against women, saying, "We do not think this a harmless hoax. We think this has real-life implications for women". Clark also hosted a Congressional briefing on March 15, along with the Congressional Victims' Rights Caucus to review issues of cyberstalking and online threats; during the briefing, Quinn spoke of her experiences with Gamergate, which an executive director of the National Coalition Against Domestic Violence described during the hearing as "an online hate group ... which was started by an ex-boyfriend to ruin [Quinn's] life". On May 27, the United States House of Representatives formally supported Clark's request for increased measures to combat online abuse against women, explicitly pressing for more investigations and prosecutions by the Department of Justice. On June 2, Rep. Clark introduced the "Prioritizing Online Threat Enforcement Act of 2015" to Congress. The bill would have allocated more funding for the FBI to employ additional agents to enforce laws against cyberstalking, online criminal harassment, and threats. Two years later, in June 2017, Rep. Clark introduced the "Online Safety Modernization Act of 2017" with co-sponsors Reps. Susan Brooks (Indiana) and Pat Meehan (Pennsylvania), which combined several of Clark's previous bills. The bill focused on penalizing "cybercrimes against individuals", including doxing, swatting, and sextortion, as well as granting $20 million for law enforcement training to help tackle such crimes, and $4 million to establish the National Resource Center on Cybercrimes Against Individuals in order to study and collect statistics and information related to these crimes.

== Gaming industry response ==
The harassment of Quinn, Sarkeesian, Wu, and others led prominent industry professionals to condemn the Gamergate attacks for damaging the video gaming community and the public perception of the industry. Vanity Fair's Laura Parker stated that the Gamergate situation led those outside of the video game industry to be "flooded with evidence of the video-game community as a poisonous and unwelcoming place", furthering any negative views they may have had of video games. Independent game developer Andreas Zecher wrote an open letter calling upon the community to take a stand against the attacks, attracting the signatures of more than two thousand professionals within the gaming industry. Many in the industry saw the signatures "as proof that the people sending vicious attacks at Quinn and Sarkeesian weren't representative of the video game industry overall". Writing for The Guardian, Jenn Frank described the tactics used in the harassment campaign and the climate of fear it generated through its attacks on women and their allies, concluding that this alienating and abusive environment would harm not only women but also the industry as a whole. Frank herself received significant harassment for writing this article, and announced an intention to quit games journalism as a result. Games designer Damion Schubert wrote that Gamergate was "an unprecedented catastrof**k [sic]", and that silencing critiques of games harms games developers by depriving them of feedback. Several video game developers, journalists, and gamers from across various gender, racial, and social backgrounds adopted new Twitter hashtags, such as #INeedDiverseGames, #StopGamergate2014 and #GamersAgainstGamergate, to show solidarity with the people targeted by the harassment and their opposition to the reactionary messages from Gamergate supporters.

The Electronic Frontier Foundation characterized Gamergate as a "magnet for harassment", and notes the possible financial risk for companies dealing with it on social media platforms. The Entertainment Software Association (ESA) issued a statement condemning the harassment, stating that "[t]here is no place in the video game community—or our society—for personal attacks and threats". ESA president Mike Gallagher, speaking at the June 2015 Electronic Entertainment Expo, clarified that the ESA did not become more involved as they felt it was an argument that was outside their industry and their involvement would have been disruptive, but praised the efforts to counter harassment that will benefit the industry in the future. At BlizzCon 2014, Blizzard Entertainment president and co-founder Mike Morhaime denounced recent harassment; blaming a "small group of people [who] have been doing really awful things" and "tarnishing our reputation" as gamers. He called on attendees to treat each other with kindness and demonstrate to the world that the community rejects harassment. His statements were widely interpreted as referring to Gamergate. CEOs of both the American and European branches of Sony Computer Entertainment, Shawn Layden and Jim Ryan respectively, said the harassment and bullying were absolutely horrific and that such inappropriate behavior would not be tolerated at Sony. The Swedish Games Industry issued a statement denouncing the harassment and sexism from Gamergate supporters. In 2016, Nintendo of America denounced Gamergate, calling it "an online hate campaign" and that "Nintendo firmly rejects the harassment of individuals in any way".

Responses to Gamergate have encouraged the video game industry to review its treatment of women and minorities, and to make changes to support them. (Note: Attributed to multiple references:) Intel, following its accidental involvement in Gamergate, pledged more than $300 million to help support a "Diversity in Technology" program with partners including Sarkeesian's Feminist Frequency organization and the IGDA, aimed at increasing the number of women and minorities in the industry. Intel CEO Brian Krzanich stated in announcing the program that "it's not good enough to say we value diversity, and then have our industry not fully represent". Electronic Arts (EA) COO Peter Moore said the controversy made EA pay more attention to diversity and inclusion, telling Fortune "[i]f there's been any benefit to Gamergate, ... I think it just makes us think twice at times". Speaking about Gamergate harassment to the Seattle Times, IGDA executive director Kate Edwards said, "Gaming culture has been pretty misogynistic for a long time now. There's ample evidence of that over and over again ... What we're finally seeing is that it became so egregious that now companies are starting to wake up and say, 'We need to stop this. This has got to change.'"

The Electronic Entertainment Expo 2015 included markedly more female protagonists in these new games, as well as more visible presence by women at the event. Some commentators characterized this as a response to Gamergate and a rejection of the misogynistic Gamergate harassment.

The game Batman: Arkham Knight, released in 2015, references Gamergate with the hashtag #CrusaderGate, which the Riddler uses to unsuccessfully try to rally the Internet against Batman; bemoaning its failure, the Riddler describes those who use the hashtag as "idiotic and easily roused rabble".

== Representation in media ==
"Intimidation Game", an episode of the crime television series Law & Order: Special Victims Unit, portrays a fictionalized version of Gamergate, including a character whom some observers said resembled Sarkeesian and whose story seemed based on those of women subject to the harassment campaign. The 2015 documentary film GTFO analyzed issues of sexism and harassment in video gaming. The film's director, Shannon Sun-Higginson, stated Gamergate was "a terrible, terrible thing, but it's actually symptomatic of a wider, cultural, systemic problem". The Gamergate situation was covered as part of a larger topic of online harassment of women in the June 21, 2015, episode of Last Week Tonight with John Oliver. The impact of the Gamergate controversy on Brianna Wu was the subject of the March 16, 2016, episode of The Internet Ruined My Life.

In October 2021, Mind Riot Entertainment announced that a fictional series based on Gamergate co-created and co-written by Wu and J. Brad Wilke was in production. The series will focus on the origins of the controversy through the lens of multiple, fictional people in the game industry such as executives, journalists, and indie developers and their subsequent reactions. On March 8, 2022, it was announced that Norman Lear and Brent Miller will be executive producers.

== Reducing online harassment ==
In January 2015, Quinn and Alex Lifschitz created the Crash Override Network, a private group of experts who provide free support and counsel to those that have been harassed online, including as a result of Gamergate, and to work with law authorities and social media sites in response to such threats. Software developer Randi Harper founded a similar group, the Online Abuse Prevention Initiative, a non-profit organization that also seeks to provide aid to those harassed online.

Anita Sarkeesian was named as one of Time magazine's list of the 30 most influential people on the Internet in March 2015, and later in the magazine's Top 100 Most Influential People of 2015, in recognition of her role in highlighting sexism in the video game community in the wake of the Gamergate controversy. She was also highlighted as one of Cosmopolitan's fifty "Internet's Most Fascinating" in a 2015 list due to her efforts to curb online harassment.

An online abuse panel (itself the subject of controversy) at the 2016 SXSW festival said that there was no technological solution to the problem of harassment given human nature; although policy changes have been made, the larger issue is more societal than platform-specific. Referring to the discussion at SXSW in a speech for Women's History Month, then-U.S. President Barack Obama said that "We know that women gamers face harassment and stalking and threats of violence from other players. When they speak out about their experiences, they're attacked on Twitter and other social media outlets, even threatened in their homes." Obama urged targets of harassment to speak out, praising the courage of those who had resisted online harassment. "And what's brought these issues to light is that there are a lot of women out there, especially young women, who are speaking out bravely about their experiences, even when they know they'll be attacked for it".

== Legacy ==
The people targeted by Gamergate have continued to be attacked in right-wing media and on men's rights websites, have been forced to limit their public appearances and social media activity, and continue to express frustration with the lack of action taken against their harassers. Despite the continued problems, some observers have argued that the video game industry has become more diverse and open to women since Gamergate began. Some figures and tactics associated with Gamergate went on to become components of the alt-right, which featured in the 2016 United States presidential election (Note: Attributed to multiple references:) and in other more targeted harassment campaigns, such as Learn to Code in early 2019.

Some commentators have argued that Gamergate helped elect Donald Trump as US president in 2016 and assisted other right-wing to far-right movements; (Note: Attributed to multiple references:) Alyssa Rosenberg called Trump "the Gamergate of Republican politics" in an opinion article for The Washington Post in 2015. Trump's strategist Steve Bannon remarked that through Milo Yiannopoulos, who rose to fame during Gamergate as the technology journalist for Breitbart News (a news website Bannon co-founded), he had created a generation and an "army" that came in "through Gamergate ... and then get turned onto politics and Trump". According to Axios, in the 2022 book Meme Wars, Joan Donovan, research director at Harvard's Shorenstein Center on Media, Politics and Public Policy, argued that Gamergate served as "the key template that the far right and former President Trump's MAGA movement have used to organize online", noting that during Gamergate, "online mobs deployed techniques and tactics that were later taken up by the Trumpist right, including the use of memes, false allegations and coordinated harassment." Donovan also argued that "similar techniques are being used to intimidate and harass entire groups of people, most prominently transgender youth and adults."

The alt-right's emergence was marked by Gamergate. According to the journalist David Neiwert, Gamergate "heralded the rise of the alt-right and provided an early sketch of its primary features: an Internet presence beset by digital trolls, unbridled conspiracism, angry-white-male-identity victimization culture, and, ultimately, open racism, anti-Semitism, ethnic hatred, misogyny, and sexual and gender paranoia". Gamergate politicized many young people, especially males, in opposition to the perceived culture war being waged by leftists. Through their shared opposition to political correctness, feminism, and multiculturalism, chan culture built a link to the alt-right. By 2015, the alt-right had gained significant momentum as an online movement. According to the Encyclopædia Britannica, Gamergate is "a manifestation of the so-called 'men's rights movement' that had its origins on the Web site 4chan." The Southern Poverty Law Center described Gamergate as an example of male supremacy.

Gamergate has been compared to the far-right political conspiracy theory QAnon. Claire Goforth of The Daily Dot argued that Gamergate helped give birth to QAnon: "Each movement, in its inception, tapped into the collective force of the army of trolls who frequent anonymous message boards. Their tactics are an outgrowth of an online subculture where no prejudice is too shocking, no attack too vicious, no accusation too egregious." and "Like Gamergate, QAnon is toxic and alluring because it clothes trolls and conspiracy theorists in the armor of righteousness. Their chosen enemies' faults are an absolute evil that needs to be excised. Nothing else matters when that's the ultimate goal." Goforth also noted that "While Gamergate was confined to the web, QAnon has crawled out of the screen." Kate Knibbs of Wired called Gamergate "proto-QAnon", saying that both are "ideologically incoherent and loosely organized, seeping across chan boards, forums, and social platforms" and that "it was impossible to tell exactly how many people actually believed what they were saying and how many were trolling."

=== 2015–2018 ===
In 2015, Yasmin Kafai, the Chair of the Teaching, Learning, and Leadership division at the University of Pennsylvania Graduate School of Education (Penn GSE), said that "What Gamergate has changed is not the situation for women and minorities in gaming, but it has changed the public perception". In 2016, Sarah Jeong of The Washington Post compared the Pizzagate conspiracy theory to Gamergate, calling both a "time the darker parts of the Internet have delivered up sustained, orchestrated harassment on the back of a convoluted nest of lies." and claimed that "If we took 'Gamergate' harassment seriously, 'Pizzagate' might never have happened". In May 2017, Sean Murray of TheGamer argued that "The most important thing that Gamergate did was bring the online harassment of women into the public consciousness. That alone is something to be thankful for, but many people went above and beyond." In July 2017, Katherine Cross of The Daily Beast compared the CNN Blackmail controversy with Gamergate, claiming that "Many of the same tactics and major players that made names for themselves in GamerGate—from Mike Cernovich to Weev—are being used to push a wide-scale harassment campaign against CNN."

In July 2018, Kishonna Gray, a communication and gender studies researcher, argued that "Gaming culture and games companies have been complicit in the abuse. There's no way that GamerGate could have had the power that it did have without that historical practice of diminishing women. The game industry weaponized GamerGate." Also in July 2018, Vox said that Gamergate's "success" "gave many on the extreme right a template for how to attack their perceived enemies" and that "The methods deployed in this ground-zero Gamergate event have since become standard practice for internet mobs wishing to attack seemingly anyone they believe to be a foe." As of 2018, "Not only are Gamergate supporters still active, but its most visible advocates seem to be thriving in the age of President Trump."

=== 2019 ===
In January 2019, Talia Lavin of The New Republic said that Gamergate was "a public test of weapons online trolls would use to inflict hell on anyone who they perceived as enemies" and that "Its tactics have only grown in sophistication in the intervening years."

In a retrospective for Slate in August 2019, Evan Urquhart wrote that Gamergate was still active on Reddit and that its members continue to harass journalists. However, Urquhart also commented that Gamergate had not stopped socially-conscious games journalism, efforts to increase diversity in games, or individuals like Quinn and Sarkeesian. In a retrospective for The New York Times, Charlie Warzel said that "Gamergate is occasionally framed as a battle for the soul of the internet between a diverse, progressive set and an angry collection of white males who feel displaced. And it is that, too. But its most powerful legacy is as proof of concept of how to wage a post-truth information war." In a retrospective for TechCrunch, Jon Evans stated that the mainstream media had not learned how to combat Gamergate-like strategies and criticized coverage from The New York Times in particular. In a retrospective for NPR, Audie Cornish said that Gamergate "was a warning and a demonstration of how bad actors could abuse the power of social networks to achieve malicious ends."

In a retrospective for Polygon in December 2019, Sarkeesian said that "GamerGate's real goals were expressed in the explicit racism, sexism, and transphobia of the memes the movement generated, and the posts its supporters wrote on the message boards where they organized and strategized. Later, the flimsiness of the 'ethics in games journalism' pretense would become a mocking meme signifying a bad faith argument. It would almost be funny, if GamerGate hadn't done so much harm, and caused so much lasting trauma." Sarkeesian also criticized the video game industry's response to Gamergate, saying that "The game industry's silence was shameful".

=== 2020–2021 ===
In a retrospective for Vox in January 2020, Aja Romano stated that police, businesses, and social media platforms are still susceptible to Gamergate-like tactics and that they would have to change in order to keep victims safe. Romano also stated that "[Gamergate's] insistence that it was about one thing (ethics in journalism) when it was about something else (harassing women) provided a case study for how extremists would proceed to drive ideological fissures through the foundations of democracy: by building a toxic campaign of hate beneath a veneer of denial." In September 2020, Kate Knibbs of Wired compared the backlash to the 2020 film Cuties with Gamergate, claiming that people were "using tactics favored by Gamergate like review bombing, online harassment, and calls for boycotts."

In the aftermath of the 2021 United States Capitol attack, Brianna Wu said that "everything I tried to get the FBI to act on in the aftermath of GamerGate has now come true ... We told people that if social media companies like Facebook and Reddit did not tighten their policies about these communities of organized hate, that we were going to see violent insurrection in the United States ... We told people that these communities were organizing online for violence and extremism. That, unfortunately, has proven to be true." Donovan said that key figures in Gamergate worked to raise online fury ahead of the attack.

In August 2021, Jen Golbeck, a computer scientist and professor at the University of Maryland, said that "The important lasting, lingering impact of [Gamergate] was it was one of the first grass-roots campaigns of harassment that had no real consequences for the people who did it". In October 2021, Andrew Paul of Input magazine said that Gamergate "is largely considered one of the biggest influences for today's spread of misinformation, unhinged online conspiracy movements, and right-wing reactionary trends" and that "Some of the most effective methods of weaponizing memes got their start within the Gamergate movement, along with doxxing tactics and harassment strategies."

=== 2022–present ===
In April 2022, David Emery of Snopes.com said that Gamergate is "considered by many a watershed event in the ascendancy of extremist personalities and tactics to online prominence" and that "Gamergate is regarded as emblematic of the deeply rooted sexist and reactionary attitudes observed not only in the male-dominated gaming industry of that time, but across the internet at large." Also in April, Caroline Sinders, a research fellow at the Center for Democracy and Technology, said that "Gamergate, for a lot of people, for mainstream culture, was the introduction to what doxxing is". In May 2022, Elle Reeve of CNN said that Gamergate resulted in a "massive wave of young people enter[ing] what had been an old man's world of White nationalism." Also in May, Katherine Denkinson of The Independent compared the backlash against Amber Heard and her supporters in her then-ongoing trial against Johnny Depp with Gamergate, claiming that "the anti-Amber train has been expertly commandeered by the alt-right", while noting that Gamergate "was quickly co-opted by the alt-right to promote anti-feminist rhetoric."

In November 2022, Brendan Sinclair of GamesIndustry.biz argued that Gamergate was a test to see "how much pushback a decentralized hate movement" would receive from the video game industry and condemned the industry's response to Gamergate as "Decry[ing] the tactics instead of the motivation". Sinclair attributed the video game industry's poor response to Gamergate and other forms of harassment "to cowardice and greed, a reluctance to take sides in any kind of argument lest they alienate potential customers", as well as the industry's inability to properly treat "abuse and misogyny within its own ranks". Sinclair also noted that "in the years since Gamergate, we've seen a new golden age for conspiracy theories, disinformation and harassment campaigns, and unapologetic fascism and racism as mainstream political views."

Also in November 2022, Stacey Henley of TheGamer argued that "Gamergate has been one of the biggest lightning rods in political recruitment of the internet era, perhaps the single-largest. What's crucial is that the people involved never cared about Gamergate in the first place. [...] All they cared about was being abusive to women." Henley also argued that "The blackpill movement, AKA the incels, also has deep roots in Gamergate." Henley concluded his article by saying that "For a campaign that wanted to take politics out of gaming, Gamergate has injected gaming deep into the veins of our politics."

In June 2023, Alyssa Mercante of Kotaku argued that "Gaming was ripe for [Gamergate]", as the marginalization of women in games and the game industry, "[coupled] with the lack of safeguards for women and other vulnerable groups on social platforms and it's not surprising that the industry became a nexus of very bad behavior." Mercante also argued that video game conventions in particular continue to be "hotbeds of sexualized abuse". Also in June 2023, Miles Klee of Rolling Stone compared contemporary backlash against "woke" corporations, such as Activision Blizzard celebrating Pride Month, to the backlash against "social justice warriors" during Gamergate.

David DePape, who had attacked Paul Pelosi, Nancy Pelosi's husband, in October 2022, asserted in his trial that part of his turn to the far-right was his involvement with Gamergate.

In March 2024, the online backlash to narrative development studio Sweet Baby Inc. was compared to Gamergate by media outlets, being dubbed "Gamergate 2.0" by The Week, Wired, and The Verge. The game Slay the Spire II was review bombed in May 2026 after it was observed that Sarkeesian was listed as a consultant in the game's credits.

In May 2026, commentators such as Nathan Grayson at Aftermath noted online backlash to the game Mixtape and compared it to Gamergate, suggesting that the reaction is fueled in part by misogyny and right-wing backlash at the game's perceived "queer friendliness". Grayson states in the article: "Mixtape looks like the fare Gamergate-adjacent types and right-wing sloptubers have been painting as bogeymen for years: visuals that evoke queer-friendly hits like Life Is Strange".

== See also ==
- Comicsgate – Movement against progressivism in the comics industry
- Manosphere – Collection of masculist and misogynistic websites and forums
- Assassin's Creed Shadows – criticism of Ubisoft for featuring a black Samurai (a 16th-century historical figure)
- Ligue du LOL – French Facebook group accused of coordinated harassment using social media
- List of -gate scandals and controversies
