= Danielle Feinberg =

American computer scientist

- Born: Boulder, Colorado, U.S.
- Education: Harvard University
- Occupations: visual effects supervisor; cinematographer; computer scientist
- Years active: 1997-present
- Employer: Pixar Animation Studios (1997-present)
- Notable work: WALL-E (2008); Brave (2012); Coco (2017); Turning Red (2022)
- Board member of: Harvard Board of Overseers

Danielle Feinberg is an American Visual effects supervisor, cinematographer and Director of Photography for Lighting at Pixar Animation Studios. She directed lighting for the Academy Award-winning films WALL-E, Brave and Coco and was the Visual effects supervisor for Turning Red.

== Life and career ==
Danielle Feinberg was born in Boulder, Colorado and graduated from Boulder High School. Growing up, she attended summer camps and after-school programs for students interested in computer programming and engineering. She attended Harvard University, where she was introduced to computer animation in a computer graphics course during her junior year. She graduated in 1996 with a Bachelor of Arts in computer science.

After graduating from Harvard, she started working at Pixar in February 1997 as a technician managing the large libraries of data and images for rendering A Bug's Life. She has since been credited for leading work in visual effects, technical direction, and graphics.

Outside of Pixar, she mentors girls to help them find inspiration in STEM through groups like Girls Who Code. She gives talks in the United States and abroad, using them when she can as a platform to encourage girls to pursue STEM fields. In fact, Made with Code, which is an initiative launched by Google, was kick started with her inspiring keynote.

In 2015, she appeared in the documentary Code: Debugging the Gender Gap. In November 2015, she delivered a talk on science and art at TED Talks Live in New York at the historic Town Hall Theater. It was also streamed by PBS. In 2022, she was featured along with Domee Shi, Lindsey Collins and Rona Liu as the leading women of Turning Red in the documentary Embrace the Panda: Making Turning Red.

She was elected to a six-year term on the Harvard Board of Overseers in 2024.

== Filmography ==
=== Feature films ===
| Year | Title | Role | Notes |
|---|---|---|---|
| 1998 | A Bug's Life | lead render technical director | |
| 1999 | Toy Story 2 | master lighting artist | |
| 2001 | Monsters, Inc. | master lighting artist | |
| 2003 | Finding Nemo | computer graphics supervisor | lead development on ocean graphics unit |
| 2004 | The Incredibles | lead lighting artist | |
| 2007 | Ratatouille | master lighting artist | |
| 2008 | WALL-E | director of photography for lighting | |
| 2012 | Brave | director of photography lighting | |
| 2015 | Inside Out | master lighting artist | |
| 2015 | The Good Dinosaur | master lighting artist | |
| 2017 | Coco | director of photography for lighting | |
| 2022 | Turning Red | visual effects supervisor | |
| 2024 | Inside Out 2 | lighting artist | |

=== Short films ===
| Year | Title | Role | Notes |
|---|---|---|---|
| 2003 | Exploring the Reef | technical supervisor | short documentary film distributed with Finding Nemo |
| 2006 | Lifted | lighting artist | Initial theatrical release with Ratatouille |
| 2008 | BURN-E | lighting consultant | |
| 2009 | Partly Cloudy | lighting | Initial theatrical release with UP |
| 2020 | SparkShorts - Loop | supervising technical director | |
| 2023 | Pete | directory of photography for lighting | Independent short film, directed by Bret Parker |

== Awards ==
| Year | Movie | Award | Notes |
|---|---|---|---|
| 2011 | | Marie Claire Magazine Women on Top | Recognized as the top "Film Techie" |
| 2013 | | 15th Assembly District Women of the Year | Issued by Assemblymember Nancy Skinner for Feinberg's work with girls in STEM |
| 2015 | | NCCWSL Woman of Distinction | Awarded by the National Conference for College Women Student Leaders |
| 2018 | Coco | Won Annie award | Outstanding achievement for product design in an animated feature production. |
| 2018 | | Girls in Tech Creator of the Year | Awarded by Girls in Tech |
| 2022 | | San Francisco Business Times OUTstanding Voices | Awarded by San Francisco Business Times for Leaders paving the way for LGBTQ equality in the workplace |
| 2022 | | Breaker of the Glass Ceiling | Awarded by the Women of Siggraph Conversations |

== See also ==
- List of Pixar films
- List of Pixar shorts
- Women in computing
