= Crash Override (book) =

2017 book by Zoë Quinn

- Hardcover (2017)
- Author: Zoë Quinn
- Genre: Nonfiction, memoir
- Published: 2017 (PublicAffairs)
- Pages: 256
- ISBN: 978-1-61039-808-4

External videos
- The author discusses the book at the Strand Bookstore

Crash Override: How Gamergate (Nearly) Destroyed My Life, and How We Can Win the Fight Against Online Hate is a memoir by indie video game developer Zoë Quinn about their experiences as the target of Gamergate and in countering online abuse.

== Reception ==
Critics praised what they described as Quinn's honest and sober outlook in the face of harassment. Kirkus Reviews wrote that the book's presentation was sometimes scattered in switching between personal anecdote and online safety advice.

The book was nominated for the 2018 Hugo Award for Best Related Work (i.e., non-fiction work related to science fiction or fantasy).
