= Ligue du LOL =

French Facebook group

The Ligue du LOL (in French), or Laughing out Loud League, is a private Facebook group created in 2009 by Vincent Glad, a French journalist. The group was initially composed of mainly young journalists, and later added communication professionals, most of them being men and Parisians. Some of its members are accused of coordinated and grouped harassment, mainly of women but also of men. An antisemitic and homophobic dimension was also noted.

The Ligue's main actions took place online on social networks, in particular Twitter. The alleged victims were harassed both online and over the phone, allegedly because of their gender, physical appearance, religion or ethnicity, and sexual orientation, as well as their professional competencies. Members of the group even turned up at their victims' workplaces.

The scandal was reported in the media on February 8, 2019, when Checknews, a fact-checking service of the French newspaper Libération, published an article about the Ligue du LOL. A dozen victims were interviewed, and denounced the mobbing behavior of certain members of the Ligue du LOL and their audiences on Twitter. Some of those identified as harassers experienced professional, but not legal, consequences, due to the fact that in many cases the statute of limitations had expired.

== Context ==
The "Ligue du LOL" is the name of a private Facebook group created in 2009 by journalist Vincent Glad, which was made up of approximately fifteen men and two or three women. Over time the Ligue du LOL grew to approximately 20 to 40 persons, mainly early users of Twitter, most of whom worked in communication, journalism, web, and advertising. According to Libération, in 2019 the group numbered around 30. After the scandal erupted in February 2019, group members defended the Facebook page by claiming that it allowed them to exchange findings on the web and to share jokes and advice. Group member Henri Michel stated that this page was intended to allow participants to make jokes that could not have been made in public. He admitted that the page also included an "observatory of Twitter personalities", where jokes were made about certain Twitter users. He commented that these Twitter users became a sort of "obsession of certain group members".

A subset of the Ligue du LOL members are accused of harassing other users of Twitter, either individually or as a group, using public and anonymous accounts. Many of the alleged victims are women, like Florence Porcel (journalist), Florence Desruol (UMP activist), Capucine Piot (bloger), Daria Marx (activist and author), Nora Bouazzouni, Mélanie Wanga(journalist), Lucile Bellan (journalist), Aïcha Kottmann (TV shows critic), as well as men like Cyprien (youtuber), Matthias Jambon-Puillet (author), Thomas Messias (journalist), and Benjamin Lancar (politician). Lancar was mocked for his presumed homosexuality: a Ligue du LOL member put his photo on a fly swatter (the French word for fly swatter, "tapette", is also a derogatory term for a gay man), at a time when he was leading the Jeunes Populaires group. He was referred to by members of the Ligue as the "tapette Lancar".

Several victims claimed they had alerted the employers of members of the Ligue who were involved in harassment. For instance, Johan Hufnagel who was a co-founder of Slate and thus Vincent Glad's manager, was reportedly informed about the group's activities.

== Exposure ==
=== Earlier attempts ===
An initial attempt to denounce the behavior of the Ligue was made in 2010 when a letter was written to be sent to several managing editors. This letter was leaked to the members of the Ligue, who published it on Twitter and mocked it, minimizing its importance. At the time Twitter was not widely used and the implicated journalists were not well known. The story attracted little attention. A 2010 tweet from Aurore Bergé stated that she "did not give a damn" about the letter. In 2019, Bergé, now a member of parliament, condemned the acts of harassment and claimed that she had no memory of the letter. This letter is nonetheless among the most discussed subjects related to the Ligue du LOL. According to journalist Christophe Colinet, who co-signed it, the belated publicity given to the letter has re-launched the online harassment.

Florence Desurol attempted to complain about the Ligue to Slate and to Gilles Klein from Arrêt sur Image at the beginning of 2010, after receiving an insulting message from Alexandre Hervaud. Klein then informed Laurent Joffrin of Libération, where Hervaud was employed. Alexandre Hervaud publicly satirized the incident and faced no apparent consequences.

The first visible disclosures of the group's activities came from an article on the French feminist blog Crêpe Georgette by Valérie Rey-Robert in 2014. In May 2018, journalist Alexandre Léchenet, professor at the ESJ in Lille published a blog post describing his realization that his own behavior might have been problematic. Léchenet said he never belonged to the Ligue, but he was accused of participating in the homophobic harassment of Benjamin Lancar.

=== Public disclosure on February 8, 2019 ===
On February 8, 2019, journalist Robin Andraca from Checknews published an article on the Ligue. He was alerted to the story by a contact calling himself "Jean", who was reacting to an article published on February 3, 2019 in Le vent se lève that featured Vincent Glad The article concerned the patronizing way the media treated the subject of the Yellow vests movement, and prompted reactions on Twitter. Andraca started his investigation by confronting Alexandre Hervaud, manager of the web department Libération, based on a comment from Hervaud on a tweet from Slate journalist Thomas Messias. Hervaud admitted that he was a member of the Ligue.

== Consequences ==
Some of the female journalists targeted by the Ligue left journalism due to the bullying. Eight of the members of the Ligue, notably Glad and Hervaud, were suspended from their positions or stepped down. The French government announced new laws to make social media platforms pull hateful posts.

== See also ==
- Gamergate (harassment campaign)
- Kiwi Farms
