= Madison Maxey =

Technologist, businessperson, and fashion designer

- Other name: Maddy
- Occupations: Engineer, entrepreneur, designer
- Known for: Innovations and inventions in E-textiles and soft, flexible electronics

Madison Maxey is an African American engineer, entrepreneur, and designer known for her innovations with e-textiles and advanced materials.

== Early life and education ==
Originally from San Diego, Madison Maxey moved to New York at 18. Her father worked as an aerospace engineer at Northrup Grumman, while Madison's mother was a flight attendant. Her father was passionate about making things. Maxey was a student at the Parsons School of Design, but only attended for one semester. She preferred to learn independently and through experience, especially in fields like 3D printing. She later completed her degree in Materials Science and Engineering at Stanford University.

== Career ==
Maxey is the founder of Loomia, a company that makes soft, flexible electronics. The original name for this company was The Crated, and the company began as a studio that combined textiles, engineering and design.

Maxey has been called a “creative technologist.” in addition to materials development, she has used code to develop computational graphic design for clients. Using code for design is different from the traditional use of coding in computer programming.

The Loomia Electronic Layer (LEL) is a soft, flexible, circuit that can heat, light and sense. Through Loomia, Maxey has created e-textile enabled prototypes for automotive companies, tech companies and clothing companies.

Maxey decided to focus on materials after using electronics, firmware and textiles to make an LED dress for which she could not find the right electronic materials . She built the electronics for this dress through a partnership with fashion designer Zac Posen and Google.

Maxey, also known as Maddy, became the first person with fashion industry experience to win the $100,000 Thiel Fellowship in 2013. At 22 years old, Maxey's work earned her recognition as one of Forbes "30 Under 30" in 2016. She also won "The Lord & Taylor Rose Award" in 2016. The award has recognized innovators for more than 6 decades.
