= Crash Override Network =

Defunct organization

- Founded: January 2015
- Founders: Zoë Quinn, Alex Lifschitz
- Dissolved: 2018
- Website: www.crashoverridenetwork.com

Crash Override Network was a support group for victims of large scale online abuse, including revenge porn and doxing.

== History ==
Crash Override was founded by game developers Zoë Quinn and Alex Lifschitz, and was staffed exclusively by victims of online abuse whose identities were kept anonymous outside the group. Quinn and Lifschitz were subjected to online abuse during the Gamergate harassment campaign, with both receiving death threats and being doxxed.

Crash Override formed a partnership with Feminist Frequency in March 2016, which served as its financial sponsor.

From December 2016, Crash Override's hotline was closed. Some time in 2018, Crash Override closed fully, and "passed the torch to other organisations".

== Mission ==
The founders of Crash Override consider it a conversation starter, a repository for addressing problems that others in and out of the gaming community "have long hoped would simply go away." The organisation's services are divided into three categories: ongoing assistance for victims, crisis centre support, and community outreach. They provide post-crisis counseling services, help seeking shelter, and access to experts in information security, white hat hacking, law enforcement, public relations and threat monitoring. The network tailors a unique plan of action for each victim and works with law enforcement, the media, and social media. They promise to help victims regardless of previous affiliations and ideology, including Gamergate supporters.

The group has been credited with defusing a swatting attack by advising the target to preemptively contact the police. Quinn said the launch of Crash Override Network led to a renewed and heightened campaign of abuse, and the website underwent daily hack attempts. In May 2015, the organisation became an official Twitter trusted safety resource.
