= Online Abuse Prevention Initiative =

Non-profit organization

- Available in: English
- Founder: Randi Lee Harper
- Commercial: No
- Launched: March 2015; 11 years ago

The Online Abuse Prevention Initiative (OAPI) was an organization founded in 2015 that aimed to study and combat abuse on the Internet.

== History ==
OAPI was created by Randi Lee Harper in response to Twitter's lack of tools for filtering online harassment. OAPI was founded in 2015, with Crash Override Network's Zoë Quinn and Alex Lifschitz stated as serving on the inaugural board of directors. In March 2015 Quinn announced a formal partnership between the two organizations. As of April 2016, Harper's work on OAPI was supported by individuals who contributed money via Patreon.

== Activities ==
The stated goals of the OAPI are to study online abuse, and to reduce and mitigate it through technical measures and collaboration with tech companies. Its first public campaign in July 2015 was an open letter to ICANN, the organization responsible for coordinating the Internet's Domain Name System, opposing the latter's plans to end anonymity of WHOIS records for commercial websites. OAPI argued that ICANN's proposals would make it easier for abusers to physically endanger domain name registrants through doxxing and swatting, and that those marginalized for their race, gender, or sexual orientation are disproportionately at risk. The letter attracted signatures and support from over fifty organizations supporting online privacy or protection of at-risk communities, including the Electronic Frontier Foundation, The Tor Project, and the National Coalition Against Domestic Violence.
