= GTFO (film) =

- Directed by: Shannon Sun-Higginson
- Produced by: Shannon Sun-Higginson
- Starring: Anita Sarkeesian; Leigh Alexander; Brenda Romero; Robin Hunicke; Rhianna Pratchett
- Release date: March 14, 2015 (SXSW)
- Running time: 76 minutes
- Country: United States
- Language: English

GTFO (also known as GTFO: Get the F&#% Out) is a 2015 American documentary film, directed by Shannon Sun-Higginson, about sexism and women in the world of video games. It premiered at South by Southwest on March 14, 2015.

Sun-Higginson, a documentary filmmaker from New York City, began work on GTFO in early 2012 and ultimately funded it as a Kickstarter project. She was initially inspired to create the film after watching a clip from live-stream gaming competition Cross Assault in which a player repeatedly sexually harassed his teammate. Sun-Higginson then "decided to take a step back and explore what it means to be a woman in gaming in general, both the positive and the negative."

The movie compiles interviews from gamers, developers, journalists to show how pervasive sexist behavior is in the gaming world.

The film's premiere at South by Southwest was met with primarily favorable reviews, with critic Dennis Harvey commenting: "Several other documentaries are currently in the works on the same subject, and many will no doubt be a lot slicker than 'GTFO.' But the rough edges of Sun-Higginson’s Kickstarter-funded feature lend it an ingratiating, unpretentious modesty, and its lack of rancor on a topic that might’ve easily supported a more sensationalist approach can only be a plus in reaching male gamers most in need of its wake-up call."
