= Jonathan McIntosh =

American producer, writer, artist, and cultural critic

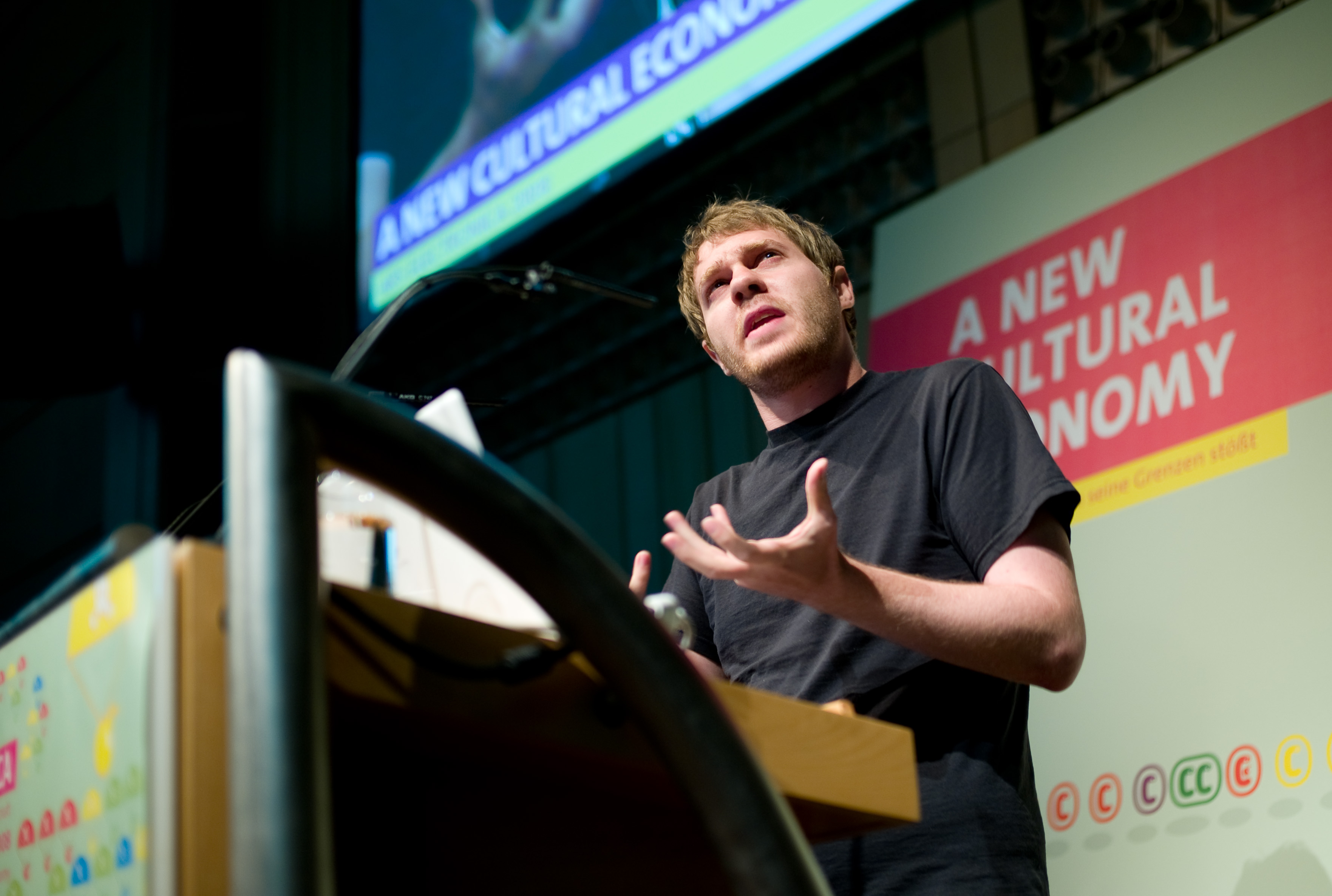
- McIntosh in 2008
- Occupations: YouTuber, pop culture critic

YouTube information
- Years active: 2008–present
- Genre: Video essay
- Subscribers: 1.16 million
- Views: 101.6 million
- Last updated: May 31, 2026
- Website: PopCultureDetective.com

Jonathan McIntosh is an American producer, writer, artist, feminist, and cultural critic. He is the creator of the Pop Culture Detective Agency video series examining intersections of politics, masculinity, and entertainment. He was also a producer and co-writer on the Tropes vs. Women in Video Games YouTube video series.

== Video ==
=== Remix work ===
McIntosh produced video mashups early in his film career. A proponent of remix culture, he spoke on the topic and how media produced in this fashion can be uniquely powerful tools for commenting on political and social issues. American academic and political activist Lawrence Lessig cites McIntosh's work as among his favorites in the book Remix: Making Art and Commerce Thrive in the Hybrid Economy for its ability to deliver "a message more powerfully than any original alone could".

==== Buffy versus Edward ====
In 2012, McIntosh spoke before the United States Copyright Office to advocate for exemptions to the Digital Millennium Copyright Act—a law designed to criminalize the unauthorized production and dissemination of technology, devices, or services regarding copyrighted works—that was adversely affecting video artists like himself. His 2009 video, "Buffy versus Edward: Twilight Remixed"—a high-profile mashup video and Webby Award nominee for remixing—was used as an example in the copyright discussion. The final rulemaking stated an exemption for "motion pictures (including television shows and videos), as defined in 17 U.S.C. 101, where circumvention is undertaken solely in order to make use of short portions of the motion pictures for the purpose of criticism or comment in limited instances." It specifically points out "Buffy versus Edward: Twilight Remixed" in the rulemaking: "Based on the video evidence presented, the Register is able to conclude that diminished quality likely would impair the criticism and comment contained in noncommercial videos. For example, the Register is able to perceive that Buffy vs Edward and other noncommercial videos would suffer significantly because of blurring and the loss of detail in characters' expression and sense of depth."

=== Tropes vs. Women in Video Games ===
From 2013−2015, McIntosh worked on the Tropes vs. Women in Video Games YouTube video series as a producer and co-writer. The web series was a highly successful Kickstarter created by Anita Sarkeesian that examined gender tropes in video games.

=== Pop Culture Detective Agency ===
In 2016, McIntosh launched the Pop Culture Detective Agency, a Patreon-funded web series examining the intersections of politics, masculinity, and entertainment. The long-form video essays examine a variety of topics within these themes. One episode explored the concept of toxic masculinity through an American pop culture lens. Other episodes are devoted to examining specific pieces of pop culture, such as television programs Steven Universe and The Big Bang Theory, and films including Fantastic Beasts and Where to Find Them and Star Wars. Some of the videos produced in the series propose new cultural tropes in which to understand the topics discussed, such as "Born Sexy Yesterday", which seeks to explain how fictional characters exhibit men’s fear of experienced women.

== Writing ==
In 2014, McIntosh wrote the opinion piece, "Playing with privilege: the invisible benefits of gaming while male", which addressed the Gamergate controversy that had been receiving increasing media attention and public discourse. In the piece, he sought to address the underlying problems that contributed toward sexism in video gaming by examining the inherent privileges that male-identified gamers benefit from. Taking inspiration from the famous Daily Effects of White Privilege list by Peggy McIntosh, among others, McIntosh listed 25 daily effects of male game privilege. These included such privileges as "I will never be asked or expected to speak for all other gamers who share my gender."
