= Naima Qorane =

Somali activist and writer

Naima Qorane is a writer, poet and pan-Somalist activist. She was arrested in January 2018 at Hargeisa Airport by Somaliland security personnel for promoting Somali unity.

== Arrest ==
The cause of the arrest by a Somaliland court was calling the self-declared republic a "region" rather than a "country" in her poetry. They sentenced her to three years after her return from Mogadishu. She had claimed that she had previously received death threats for her advocacy. The Guardian described the arrest as part of a broader crackdown, with at least 12 writers, bloggers and activists arrested since December 2017. She reportedly also received rape threats if she did not hand over the password to her mobile phone.
