= R v Elliott =

Canadian case regarding harassment and freedom of speech

R v Elliott was a criminal harassment trial based in Toronto, Ontario, Canada. Gregory Alan Elliott was charged with criminally harassing three women in the Toronto area, following a protracted dispute with feminist activist Stephanie Guthrie. The case was considered to have implications for free speech in Canada, and to be the first prosecution for harassment solely involving activity on the social networking website Twitter. After the trial's conclusion earlier cases of criminal harassment on Twitter were found but Elliott's is still the only one known that didn't include any violent threats.

Charges involving one of the women were dropped before trial. On January 22, 2016, Ontario Court of Justice judge Brent Knazan acquitted Elliott of the remaining charges of criminal harassment. Elliott soon returned to Twitter after having been restricted from using the Internet as a bail condition for three years.

== Background ==
Following her 2012 Kickstarter campaign for the Tropes vs. Women in Video Games video series, feminist critic Anita Sarkeesian began to receive large volumes of online criticism and harassment. One form of harassment commonly decried in the media was a Newgrounds game in which players punched a photograph of Sarkeesian, causing her to appear progressively more bruised and injured. The game's creator, Bendilin Spurr, who had previously made a similar game about punching conservative lawyer and anti-video-game activist Jack Thompson, denied that the games promoted real violence.

Stephanie Guthrie, a Toronto-based feminist activist, was among those who objected to Spurr's game, and contacted news organizations and potential employers in Spurr's hometown. Gregory Alan Elliott, a Toronto artist, criticized Guthrie's actions as "every bit as vicious as the face-punch game". In response, Guthrie and others blocked him on Twitter and reported his account to the site's operators, who found he wasn't violating their terms of service. Elliott continued tweeting criticism to their accounts and commenting on their online and offline activities. Guthrie convened a meeting of friends to discuss Elliott's behaviour. An investigating officer later testified that he found that none of Elliott's messages were sexual in nature or threatened harm against any of the women.

== Trial ==
Elliott was charged by the Crown in November 2012 for breach of a peace bond and criminal harassment of Guthrie. Elliott was released on bail on the condition that he did not tweet or access Twitter, have a smartphone or use a computer with Internet access. Two more women, Paisley Rae and Heather Reilly, subsequently went to police in January 2013. Elliott lost his job shortly after his arrest. The charge related to Rae was dropped by the Crown late into the trial on the day she was to take the stand to testify, while the charge related to Reilly continued.

The case hinged on whether the women reasonably feared for their safety. In cross-examination, Guthrie defended her continued tweeting and allegations about Elliott, including creating hashtags to mock him, after having blocked him. Elliott's defense lawyer said that Guthrie was the one harassing and abusing.

The trial had to be delayed in March 2014 after the judge received a signed letter alleging a conspiracy against Elliott by the complainants, that also included the Ministry of the Attorney General.

On January 22, 2016, all charges against Elliott were dismissed. Judge Knazan said there was no reasonable fear for their safety as Elliott's tweets contained nothing of a "violent or sexual nature" and there was no indication he intended to hurt the women. Knazan wrote that Elliott was engaged in legitimate debate, and the judge gave the opinion that those who create Twitter hashtags do not have a right to control who uses the hashtags.

On March 4, 2016, Judge Knazan amended his original ruling which claimed Elliott's tweets were "obscene and homophobic in at least two instances" when it was discovered that the tweets were actually made by an account impersonating Elliott. The judge issued a correction saying "Mr. Elliott never wrote homophobic tweets, used homophobic language or was homophobic." He further stated that the fake account could be considered the criminal offense of "impersonation with intent to cause mischief."

== Reactions ==
Elliott is believed to be the first Canadian prosecuted solely for tweets, and several commentators believe the case has significant implications for free expression and freedom of speech in Canada.

The National Post later reported that there had been three previous cases involving harassment on Twitter. In one case, Damany Skeene was convicted of criminal harassment and uttering threats against Conservative MP Michelle Rempel. Another involved a woman being found guilty of criminally harassing then Quebec premier Pauline Marois and the third involved a Montreal man pleading guilty to uttering threats against atheists.

A Toronto coffee shop was the subject of controversy over artwork by Elliott that the shop displayed.
