= History vs Women =

2018 book by Anita Sarkeesian

History vs Women: The Defiant Lives That They Don't Want You to Know
- Front cover
- Author: Anita Sarkeesian; Ebony Adams
- Illustrator: T.S. Abe
- Language: English
- Subject: Women's history
- Publisher: Macmillan Publishing
- Publication date: October 2, 2018
- Media type: Print
- ISBN: 978-1-250-14673-1

History vs Women: The Defiant Lives That They Don't Want You to Know is a 2018 book by Anita Sarkeesian and Ebony Adams, illustrated by T.S. Abe, which profiles 25 women from history. The subjects featured are from a diverse range of historical periods and locations, and include women who had a negative impact on the world. The book has received positive critical reception.

== Background ==
Anita Sarkeesian is a Canadian-American critic and founder of Feminist Frequency, a website and YouTube channel dedicated to feminist analysis of media. The series Tropes vs. Women in Video Games ran from 2013 to 2017, analysing gender tropes in video games. Beginning with the project's 2012 announcement, Sarkeesian was subject to a widespread online campaign of sexist harassment. Ebony Adams has worked extensively with Sarkeesian on later Feminist Frequency series, such as The FREQ Show.

The book was announced in September 2017. Bustle notes that the book is part of a trend of books about women whose achievements have been overlooked.

== Synopsis ==
The book profiles 25 historical women in a writer's voice, with illustrations of each of the subjects. The subjects' lifespans range from third-century to 20th century, as the authors' only criterion was that living women would not be included. The book contains a mixture of women with a positive and negative impact on the world, with Adams saying that feminism should reflect "the fullness of women" rather than only "women who are doing heroic, amazing things" and Sarkeesian commenting that "Women are fully human. Sometimes, that means we're terrible."

The women chosen include American motorcyclist Bessie Stringfield, American trans woman Lucy Hicks Anderson, Colombian drug lord Griselda Blanco, Italian painter Artemisia Gentileschi, Punjab fighter Mai Bhago and Vietnamese warrior Bà Triệu. Also included are a British prime minister, a Chinese pirate, an Egyptian scientist, a Mongolian wrestler, a Native American ballerina and a Japanese novelist.

== Release ==
The book was released on October 2, 2018, by Macmillan Publishing. Sarkeesian and Adams began an eight-day tour for the book on October 3, 2018.

== Reception ==
School Library Journal gave the book a starred review, praising the global and economic diversity of the women featured in the book. The review summarised: "Filled with strength, this collection is incredibly inspiring and will instill in teens a take-charge attitude and powerful mind-set." Kerri Jarema of Bustle praises the "beautiful full-color illustrations" and writes that the book is "perfect" for "anyone who wants to read different take on history". Jody DiPerna of Pittsburgh Current also praises the illustrations that "bring each subject to life with movement and humanity". DiPerna comments that "[e]ach chapter is a brisk read, with driving and sometimes elegant prose" and singles out the profile of Lucy Hicks Anderson as "moving".
