= Pridgen v University of Calgary =

Pridgen v University of Calgary was freedom of speech case which took place in Alberta, Canada, in 2010. The case deals with two university students, Keith and Steven Pridgen, who were found guilty and punished by the University of Calgary in 2008, on grounds of "non-academic misconduct".

The University of Calgary defines "non-academic misconduct" as:

(a) conduct which causes injury to a person and/or damage to University property and/or the property of any member of the University community;

(b) unauthorized removal and/or unauthorized possession of University property; and

(c) conduct which seriously disrupts the lawful educational and related activities of other students and/or University staff.

The Court of the Queen's Bench of Alberta found the University of Calgary to be wrong in prosecuting ten students, including the Pridgen brothers, in regards to comments made about a professor on Facebook. The key ruling in this case was that the universities are not exempt from, and that these students were in fact protected under, section 2(b) of the Charter of Rights and Freedoms. This case is notable as it highlights the jurisdiction of the Charter in terms of both new media technologies and university institutions in Canada.

== Background ==
Keith and Steven Pridgen were undergraduate students at the University of Calgary in 2008. The twin brothers shared a Law and Society class being taught by Aruna Mitra. Professor Mitra was teaching this class for the first time in her career, and many of the students were very critical of her knowledge of the course. A Facebook page entitled “I NO Longer Fear Hell, I Took a Course with Aruna Mitra” was created, and many students began posting comments.

In particular, Steven Pridgen's comment on November 13, 2007, read:

“Somehow I think she just got lazy and gave everybody a 65....that's what I got. Does anybody know how to apply to have it remarked?”

Many students had similar concerns to Pridgen's and after having their work re-marked, a number of them did in fact receive higher grades.

Keith Pridgen also commented on August 26, 2008:

“Hey fellow LWSO. Homees.. So I am quite sure Mitra is NO LONGER TEACHING ANY COURSES WITH THE U OF C !!!!! Remember when she told us she was a long-term professor? Well, Actually she was only sessional and picked up our class at the last moment because another prof wasn't able to do it ...lucky us. Well, anyways I think we should all congratulate ourselves for leaving a Mitra-free legacy for future students!”

On September 4, 2008, Aruna Mitra complained about the Facebook page to the Interim Dean of the Faculty of Communication and Culture at the University of Calgary. Dean Tettey called a meeting for the ten students who posted material about Mitra on the Facebook page. The meeting took place on September 18, 2008, and included four professors from the department as well as the Dean. At this meeting, all ten students, including the Pridgen brothers, were found guilty of non-academic misconduct.

On November 20, 2008, the Appellant's received a letter from Dean Tettey advising them that their comments “clearly caused unwarranted professional and personal injury to Prof. Mitra and clearly meets the criteria for non-academic misconduct as outlined in the University of Calgary Calendar”.

Keith Pridgen was put on probation for 24 months, and both brothers were required to write a letter of apology to Prof. Mitra and refrain from posting or circulating defamatory material regarding any faculty members of the University of Calgary.

The Pridgen brothers appealed the decision to the University of Calgary Review Committee and later to the Board of Governors of the University of Calgary however neither of these attempts succeeded in having the decision overturned.

== Opinion of the Court ==
Eight main issues to be determined were laid out by the Honourable Madam Justice J. Strekaf:

(a) Does the Charter apply to the disciplinary proceedings taken by the Respondent;

(b) If, so were the Applicants' Charter rights infringed;

(c) Were the actions taken by the University ultra vires the jurisdiction of the Province of Alberta;

(d) Did the Board of Governors err in refusing to hear the Applicants appeals;

(e) Were the Applicants' denied a fair hearing;

(f) Did the Review Committee provide adequate reasons for its decisions;

(g) Did the Review Committee err in concluding that the activities of the Applicants constituted non-academic misconduct; and

(h) What, if any, remedy should be granted to the Applicants.

The Court determined from previous cases that "a non-government entity may still be subject to the Charter of Rights and freedoms when implementing a specific government policy or program". Justice Strekaf distinguished that the University was acting as agent of the provincial government in providing accessible post-secondary education services to students in Alberta pursuant to the provisions of the PSL Act. Justice Strekaf felt there was sufficient evidence to show that universities in Alberta have some level of reliance on government funds and therefore they are not a "Charter free zone". Justice Strekaf concluded that comments made by Keith and Steven Pridgen, regarding Professor Mitra, on Facebook did not constitute academic misconduct and the Pridgen brothers' right to freedom of expression, under section 2(b) of the Charter, was infringed by the University of Calgary Review Committee.

== See also ==
- Freedom of expression in Canada
