= Sexism and video games =

Gender-based prejudice or discrimination related to video games

Sexism in video gaming is prejudiced behavior or discrimination based on sex or gender as experienced by people who play and create video games, primarily women. This may manifest as sexual harassment or in the way genders are represented in games, such as when characters are presented according to gender-related tropes and stereotypes.

Since the 1980s and 1990s, video game culture has veered from its original perception as a space for just young men. Women make up about 50 percent of all game players as of the 2010s. The growing presence of women in the gaming sphere, and subsequently publicized incidents of harassment towards women in this field, has pushed industry professionals to pay attention to sexism in video gaming.

== Harassment ==
=== Form ===
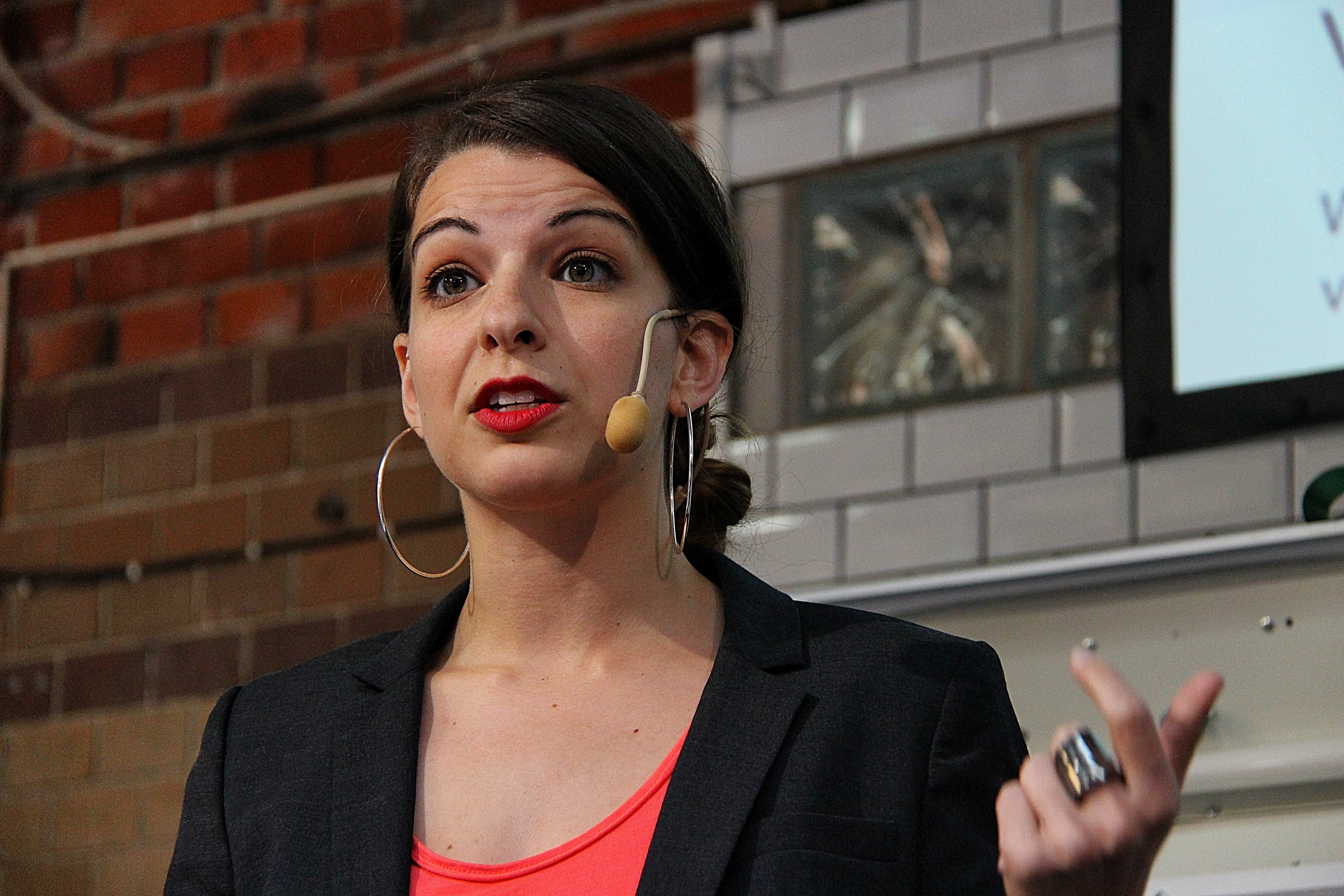
Media critic Anita Sarkeesian drew attention to sexism in video gaming with her video series Tropes vs. Women in Video Games.

Harassment can involve sexist insults or comments, death or rape threats, demanding sexual favors in exchange for virtual or real money, or criticism of the presence of women and their interests. In some cases, female players are also stalked, whether online or offline.

Women are sometimes marginalized as "intruders", as it is assumed they do not play video games that aren't associated with female players such as the Sims, music video games or casual games. Conversely, insults towards men focus mainly on their alleged lack of manliness for playing "girl games" or disliking violent games. As a result, women may face offensive behavior at conventions, competitions or in video games stores. It may affect female gamers, journalists or game developers, even when they are invited to talk at a conference or to present a game. Since the release of the NES, video games advertisements have been accused of strengthening this tendency by targeting only men. In the 1980s, women stopped being represented playing video games in advertisement and scantily clad women started being used on game covers and ads. Some women saw their non-sexualized female character designs rejected, and others reported sexual harassment in the workplace.

In 2014, the International Game Developers Association conducted a survey that demonstrated some of the lack of professionalism women in the game developing field were met with. Firstly, women reported defiance from their subordinate male colleagues. The study also showed that white males were favored for positions of management and all throughout the hiring process. Female developers from the survey also revealed that they were not taken seriously in the field and instead were met with inappropriate behavior from male colleagues, such as being misled into attending dates.

Online video games can be host to extreme sexism towards women, with 65% of women reporting an instance of sexual harassment in this setting. In comparison to their male counterparts, women are subject to three times the amount of derogatory or offensive remarks, which can be made anonymously by gamers.

Video games conferences have been criticised for using sexualised advertising such as 'booth babes', creating a demeaning image of women, and for failing to stop harassment of female attendees. This has led some to adopt or share codes of conduct for managing these issues.

One form of harassment involves perpetrators changing their username to include sexist or racially charged language when they leave comments during live-streams, according to gamer Amira Virgil.

=== Frequency ===
Insults are frequent in online gaming. According to Stephen Toulouse (moderator of the online gaming service Xbox Live), between 2007 and 2012 women were the most frequent target of harassment. However, data from Riot Games lists racism and homophobia as the top problems. Furthermore, derogatory words for homosexuality are used almost constantly in online gaming.

In 2012, a study of the Ohio University showed that the same person playing Halo 3 online with a male and a female profile using recorded voice messages received three times more negative comments with the female profile, despite similar game scores. Even welcoming everybody at the beginning of a game could lead to sexist insults against the female profile. A 2015 study of Halo 3 player interactions found that less-skilled male players display a tendency to make "frequent, nasty comments" to female gamers. The researchers suggested that the poorly performing males "attempt to disregard a female's performance and suppress her disturbance on the hierarchy to retain their social rank."

In an ethnographic study of Xbox Live, Kishonna Gray wrote that a lot of the racism and sexism experienced in the gaming platform is facilitated by linguistic profiling. Linguistic profiling is comparable to racial profiling or gender profiling, but is based on voice and speech rather than appearance. It is common in gaming spaces that rely on voice communications rather than text. There are certain linguistic stereotypes that may be associated with one's voice, making women more vulnerable to discrimination just based on how they sound.

A study from 2006 showed that 83.4% of gamers had seen the words "gay" or "queer" used as derogatory names, and that 52.7% of gay gamers perceived the gaming community as "somewhat hostile" while 14% perceived it as "very hostile".

According to Lucy Waterlow, there appears to be a deep history of sexual harassment in the video game industry and women who play video games on online forums such as Call of Duty are often told they should "return to the kitchen", along with other slurs. However, the changing demographics that have been seen in the video game community (an increasing proportion of people who play video games are, as it appears, female.), have led to certain consequences. The largest change in terms of who plays video games has been that of gender proportions. This translates to more women playing video games than ever before, "almost reaching parity" with the number of men that play video games. The most visible and immediate ramifications of that have been the resistance of men and even some women within the industry.

Critics have stated that there is an increasing pervasiveness of the sexual harassment of women in the video game community. A study conducted by Kate O'Halloran in 2017 found that women receive an almost amplified amount of harassment in the setting of online video games than they do in real life, whereas preferential treatment is given to men by other men. The difference in the treatment of women further diminishes the desire of women to participate in video games, or, as O'Halloran found, to completely conceal their gender identity and allow other players to assume their gender. Liliana Braumberger, a participant in O'Halloran's study, states that this stems from the fact that the men who engage in this form of sexual harassment have the invisibility and anonymity that comes with participating in an online server, and that men have a certain sense of entitlement that leads to the invisibility of women. She feels that this discrimination and erasure potentially have the same effects on other people who do not identify as men, not necessarily just women.

=== The #MeToo impact on the video game industry ===
In October 2017 the #MeToo movement highlighted sexual harassment allegations against several important and high-profile figures predominately from the entertainment industry. In response to a growing number of claims of harassment, several important figures in games media or publishing made public statements outlining their thoughts on how more needed to be done within the industry to do better when dealing with harassment including Jennifer MacLean, Executive Director of the International Game Developers Association, and Kate Edwards, the former director, Joe Smedley of Sony Online Entertainment and Mike Wilson of Devolver Digital. The IGDA meanwhile published a public statement criticising "The prevalence of sexual harassment and assault in our community" and demanding "action from every game developer to ensure the safety and support of all of our colleagues and community members. We all must do a better job of welcoming, and protecting, all game developers so that our community, craft, and industry can thrive." While some commentators called for action throughout the industry to call out toxic behaviour, Brianna Wu, who had been one of those targeted during the Gamergate controversy, argued from her experience that the video game industry did not have a system in place to support those women that came forward, thus favoring silence on such matters.

In January 2018 following a public outcry the Game Developers Conference rescinded a Pioneer Award to Nolan Bushnell after revelations about early Atari meetings being held in hot tubs, amongst other claims. While the decision was criticised in some parts, including by some of the leading women at Atari during that period in time, Bushnell himself supported the decision and applauded the GDC "for ensuring that their institution reflects what is right, specifically with regards to how people should be treated in the workplace".

In a January 2018 an opinion piece in The Guardian, journalist Keza McDonald speculated that the video game industry would have a similar "#MeToo moment", but was not currently ready. McDonald highlighted a few instances of action being taken but noted that "there has been no mass movement of women coming forward with their stories of workplace harassment", and suggested that the harassment of individuals associated with #1reasonwhy and #Gamergate deterred women from opening themselves "up to further harassment, victim-blaming, and unpleasant professional ramifications".

In August 2019, following Nathalie Lawhead coming forward with sexual assault accusations against Jeremy Soule, several other women and non-binary people brought additional accusations of sexual assault, harassment, and abuse against members of the industry, including some whose reports had been generally overlooked in the past. A number of industry members established a "Times Up" group to encourage other women to speak up about events in their past. Anita Sarkeesian stated that this may be the expected #MeToo moment for the industry.

A similar wave of sexual harassment and misconduct accusations occurred in June 2020. Initial claims were made against one of the popular Destiny 2 players on Twitch by several women on June 19, 2020, accusing this player of inappropriate conduct in both online and offline behavior. This led to at least seventy women involved in the industry to speak out on other Twitch streamers who had engaged in similar inappropriate behavior, including one directed at Omeed Dariani, the CEO of Online Performers Group, a talent agency that represents many Twitch streamers. Dariani apologized for his past behavior and subsequently stepped down. Twitch was also criticized for allowing such behavior to occur, and the service said it would begin to evaluate all reported incidents and work with law enforcement as necessary. The event led to other accusations of past misconduct to be raised against various members of the video game industry and other closely related markets, including freelance writer Chris Avellone (later retracted), CEO of Cards Against Humanity Max Temkin (who resigned following the allegations), Wizards of the Coast artist Noah Bradley (who was terminated following the accusations), and Ubisoft creative director Ashraf Ismail (who stepped down from his position to deal with his personable matters). Both Ubisoft and Insomniac Games also addressed additional claims of their employees being accused of sexual harassment and stated they would take these accusations seriously and investigate the matters internally. Charges were made toward the CEO of Evolution Championship Series (EVO), Joey Cuellar, who was subsequently let go. Multiple publishers that had backed the event had pulled out on this news, and the EVO event, which had already been reworked as an online event due to the COVID-19 pandemic, was subsequently cancelled.

However, the #MeToo movement has partially made its way to the gaming industry, starting from the audience's demand, and is currently moving its way up. More and more gamers are looking to expand their gameplay to play protagonists of different identities, allowing them to see the world through somebody else's eyes. Hence, the #MeToo movement is starting to seep into the gaming industry itself.

=== Examples ===
Events since 2006 have brought media attention to the frequent occurrences and nature of sexism in video gaming and the video game industry across the globe:

==== North America ====
- In May 2012, the Kickstarter crowdfunding of videos on female representation in video games received wide coverage due to the cyber-bullying of its founder, the feminist video-blogger Anita Sarkeesian. Her Facebook, YouTube and email accounts were subsequently flooded with hateful and sexist comments, death and rape threats, and photoshopped pictures of her getting raped by video game characters. A game was created, inviting players to beat her up. She eventually collected $160,000 out of the requested $6,000. The most recent threat against Anita Sarkeesian was in Logan, Utah, on October 15, 2014. She was scheduled to deliver a speech on a Wednesday evening until an anonymous email message arrived a day before, stating that there would be a mass shooting if the event was held.
- In November 2017, the cosplayer Christine Sprankle announced that she was quitting Magic: the Gathering cosplay due to persistent harassment. In a Twitter post, she named MtGHeadquarters/UnsleevedMedia as having made her "life hell this whole year". In response, Wizards of the Coast posted a tweet saying they are "saddened", and that the bullying and harassment is "unacceptable". Additionally, many professional Magic players posted an open letter in support of Sprankle and in criticism of the harassment. Jeremy Hambly, the accused, remarked that Wizards of the Coast may likely issue a ban that would affect his ability to play Magic Online among other formats.
- A female player answered in a forum post that she had experiences of sexism during online games. When she said in voice chat during the game, "the sniper is in the bottom corner in the bushes under the Tower," one of the male players in the game called her names that look down on women. The female player only can play with mute mode so that she does not have to listen, and her mic stays off most of the time.
- A female player said in an interview that if your username looks too feminine or if you use voice chat as a woman, other players will kick you out of the game.
- Another female Latina player answered the interview. She said that men would send her unsolicited pictures, or they would harass her during online games. Moreover, one of her experiences is that the other players would say she was a guy playing under a girl's name just because she played well in the game. She was hesitant to jump into multiplayer and practiced by herself before going online. And once she was online, she dominated the public leaderboards, but the gamer is almost universally assumed to be male. Other online gamers would compliment her and refer to her using male language and pronouns. She never bothered to correct it because when she did, it would spark unwanted conversations. She eventually stopped talking with her microphone because the other players would sexually harass her by doing things like asking for her phone number.
- A Puerto Rican male player told the interviewer he witnessed another player turn on his microphone at the end of a match to tell a female player to "get in the kitchen" and get him food as well as use racial slurs and stereotypes until she disconnected from the game.
- Kuznekoff and Rose were studying about sexism in online video. They played a networked violent game with other anonymous players and interacted with them using male or female pre-recorded voices. The female voice received three times the amount of negative comments that the male voice received.
- There is a long history of video games sexualizing Native American and Black women, starting with Custer's Revenge, in which the player could rape women of color.

==== South America ====
- A study at the Federal University of the State of Rio de Janeiro found that female respondents experienced cases of sexism while playing online video games twice as much as male respondents, and cases of sexism were witnessed by 75 percent of all respondents.

==== Europe ====
- In February 2012, the behavior of a Tekken team coach against a female player of his team during a Capcom competition named Cross Assault provoked an outrage. He interrogated her about her bra size, asked her to remove her shirt, took a webcam to film her breasts and her legs, smelled her and discussed her appearance during the live broadcast of the tournament on the internet. He then stated that sexual harassment and the fighting game community are "one and the same thing" and that it would be "ethically wrong" to remove sexual harassment from the community. After a few days without any reaction from the sponsoring company, the female player eventually gave up the competition. Capcom later issued an apology and stated that "any inappropriate or disrespectful comments will not be tolerated during filming". The team coach also apologized afterwards.
- In France, the female blogger Mar_Lard brought attention to the sexism in the video gaming community in May 2013 by publishing a blog post named Sexisme chez les geeks: Pourquoi notre communauté est malade, et comment y remédier, a compilation of sexism problems in the geek community.

==== East Asia ====
- In 2014 the International Esports Federation, headquartered in South Korea, sparked public outcries after it ruled that they could make rules to keep women out of Hearthstone tournaments.
- South Korea's Kim "Geguri" Se-yoen, who became Overwatch's first and only female professional gamer in 2016, competed in a Nexus Cup qualifier and was accused by multiple male players of using aim assist software after the match and was forced to prove her innocence in a live demonstration.

==== Middle East ====
- When Arab gamers were interviewed about Arab representation in video games, some players expressed concern that Arab female characters were often sexualized and portrayed as belly dancers or slaves. Other Arab gamers expressed more concern about the male Arab representation, claiming there was a largely male audience, but still thought that Arab women should be shown respectfully.
- In a study on Arab gamers, many gamers saw that game developers showed Arab women as submissive and sexy, while Arab men were shown as violent terrorists.

== Effects ==
A study performed by Jesse Fox et al. suggested that due to the Proteus effect, manifesting a sexualized character in a video game can have adverse mental effects. They designed a study in which 86 women from West Coast university played a virtual reality game. Women who used sexualized characters that looked like them had a higher rape myth acceptance than those in other conditions, which is the validation of incorrect and stereotypical ideas about rape that blame the victim, and increased body-related thinking which can lead to increased self-objectification. When players immerse themselves into the games they are playing, it allows them to watch their behaviors from an external viewpoint. For some, they become more pleased with their avatar in the video game and it makes them feel good because they get to be the person they want to be. They lose sight of their physical self and match their modified self in the game. Yee and Bailenson found, in a study, that when the players manifest an attractive character, they are more open to talking to another character and will open up more. When women, especially, take over more sexualized characters, they begin to center on the more physical and sexual features, and their opinion start to support the materialization and sexualization of women.

In 1998, Fredrickson and Roberts created the idea of objectification theory, stating that it was an environment when cultures press both girls and women to socialize in a way that they will begin to form ideas that they should be looked at as objects. It takes away their self worth and causes them to think they are only in their society to be looked at for their bodies, with a purely sexual use. Women begin to hold onto this perspective and believe that their appearance is most important and how they are valued. Combined with the Proteus effect, it is expected that a woman who chooses a more sexualized avatar will objectify themselves more than one who chooses a non-sexualized avatar.

In another study, 181 students from a private liberal arts college in North Carolina were tested. The group exposed to highly sexualized images, from video games (in comparison to control group), was more tolerant to sexual harassment but showed the same rape myth acceptance. A similar study was done in France, studying young adults being exposed to sexist materials in video games. The sample filled out a survey, which compared how much time they spent playing video games and their attitudes towards women. The results showed that when narrowed down to gender and socioeconomic levels, a connection was made between stronger sexist views and a higher amount of time spent playing video games.

Karen E. Dill and Kathryn P. Thill state that adolescents, particularly boys and those who play games, are ignorant of the adverse impacts of detestable media content, and therefore ignorant of when they are affected adversely. Theories such as the cultivation theory, social cognitive theory, ambivalent sexism theory, and hegemonic masculinity theory all aid Dill and Thill in discussing the repercussions of perpetuating gender stereotypes in media like video games. Cultivation theory is key to the analysis of sexism in video games, because it is the idea that when an individual is exposed long-term to multimedia, their understanding of their reality can change into becoming more similar to the media. These theories also illustrate the ways prominent video game characters are gendered and what is received by the user or viewer. They write that "Gender portrayals of video game characters reinforce a sexist, patriarchal view that men are aggressive and powerful and that women are not healthy, whole persons, but sex objects, eye candy and generally second-class citizens."

According to Jeffrey Kuznekoff and Lindsey Rose, the fact that gamers experience misconstrued portrayals of appearance, violence, and sexual objectification can impact their understanding and communication with other gamers, especially female gamers. In addition, these gender portrayals become increasingly prominent because of the mass appeal and number of users of online multiplayer games. They found that the female voice received nearly three times as many directed negative comments than the male voice or control. They also found that there was no correlation between the number of directed negative comments and the skill level of the other player. On several occasions, the female voice received strong sexist replies for phrases such as "hi everybody" or "alright team let's do this" despite the female voice having almost the same win percentage as the male voice (56% to 61%, respectively). Additionally, they found that when the other player responded with a positive remark, they were more likely to ask questions. Overall, Kuznekoff and Rose found that there were hypernegative effects with hostile targeting of the female voice.

In 2015, a three-year German study of 824 gamers found, when controlling for age and education, that there was no correlation between sexist attitudes and time spent playing video games, or with preference for video game genres. The longitudinal study was based on cultivation theory, and the results broadly showed that playing video games did not lead to gamers becoming sexist. The authors Johannes Breuer, Rachel Kowert, Ruth Festl and Thorsten Quandt have, however, been keen "to make clear that [their] study does not show that sexism is not an issue in/for games and gaming culture. There are many content analyses of popular games that show that female characters are underrepresented or presented in an overly sexualized manner and there is also ample evidence that many players, particularly female, have experienced sexism in their interactions with other players."

A study published in May 2016 investigated the common perception of a gender performance gap. The researchers analysed the performance data of over 10,000 players (both men and women) in the online MMORPGs EverQuest II in the United States and Chevaliers III in China. The study contends that "perceived gender-based performance disparities seem to result from factors that are confounded with gender (i.e., amount of play), not player gender itself". Lead author Cuihai Shen stated that if there was a gender disparity favoring men then "they should advance to higher levels within the same amount of play time" however their analysis indicated "women advanced at least as fast as men did in both games". Shen outlined that there was a difference in play style between the genders, and stated "women did spend less time playing overall than men, they chose characters that are more assistive, and were more drawn to social interaction and helping others.

In their 2016 analysis of female characters in video games, Lynch, Tompkins, van Driel, & Fritz looked at the frequency of females in lead roles, secondary roles, as well as the level of sexualization of the female characters. They found that, from 1992 to 2006, far more female characters were in secondary roles than lead roles, as well as being at higher rates of sexualization. However, from 2007 to 2014, they found that there was a decrease in the sexualization and objectification of females characters in video games, with an influx of positive characteristics such as female characters being portrayed as strong, capable, and attractive, as well as giving these women more character development. These aspects they suspect may attract more women to get into playing video games.

In a study by Tang & Fox in 2016, they looked at if there was any correlation between men's personality and contextual factors and if these factors could predict the men's behaviors and the types of harassment these men would employ as they played video games. Their study found that the men who were categorized as showing signs of being socially dominant and hostile sexism carried out acts of verbal sexual harassment, such as "making sexist comments and joking about rape." These same men were also found to have executed general harassment, such as "swearing at a player or insulting their intelligence or skill," and that general harassment was found more often in those who also showed signs of being involved in the game and those who played games on a weekly basis.

According to Paaßen, Morgenroth, and Stratemeyer in their 2017 article, they compared how often men identified as gamers compared to women. They found that men were more likely to publicly identify as gamers while females felt compelled to either identify as either as female or as a gamer. This led to their conclusion that these findings reinforce the stereotypes that women cannot be gamers and how that this is certainly detrimental to females who identify themselves as gamers, as women already have negative experiences in the professional spheres of video game culture, especially when compared to that of their male counterparts.

In a study by Read, Lynch, and Matthews in 2018, it was found that men who played as sexualized avatars showed reduced rates of hostile sexism, and for both men and women it was found that their levels of rape myth acceptance (RMA) was also reduced.

In their 2022 study, Kuss et al. found that when gaming, women found that they were treated differently than male players when their gender was known. They would be subject to personal questions and special treatment if they even appeared as female. Therefore, many women preferred to play with male avatars, as to not draw attention to their gender.

== Countermeasures ==
Female activists actively promote changes in the way women are portrayed in games and how they are treated by the industry and gaming public as a whole. Media critic Anita Sarkeesian, for example, has – through her organization Feminist Frequency – given lectures and training to help change gaming culture.

A prevailing perception is that the gaming industry is not fit for female workers because of sexism. According to Richard Wilson, CEO of TIGA, "typically, 80% of the workforce is qualified to degree level or above, but the proportion of women studying subjects such as computer science or games programming courses is low. There is only a comparatively small pool of potential female employees available to work in the games industry."

Initiatives on the part of gaming companies include codes of conduct and the adoption of trainings and standards to ensure safe and respectful workplace. In an attempt to combat sexism, the French government in 2016 proposed pieces of legislation that would give bonuses or incentives to video game creators that promote a more positive image of female characters in their games. Furthermore, these proposals outline a rating system that distinguishes games that promote a positive female representation and those that do not, with the latter getting the highest age 18 rating.

In a 2016 study conducted by Kaye & Pennington, they ultimately propose that the gaming industry should start to integrate systems that promote more positive forms of socializing between the players, provide the ability for players to work on cooperative tasks with other groups while being a part of their own, and that changes like these could help lessen the negative and hostile attitudes that female players face regularly, concluding that these efforts would help reduce the rate at which these hostile behaviors happen.

AnyKey is a non-profit organization that is working to combat sexism in the gaming community. The organization's goal is to advocate for a diverse, equal and inclusive competitive gaming and live-streaming sphere. Some of their efforts include providing supportive resources to marginalized players in the gaming sector, like women. The group has launched an e-sports diversity initiative, and have produced white papers on the topic of women in esports and online harassment. Women in Games is another not for profit organization that advocates specifically for gender equality in the gaming and esports industry. They do this through showcasing the creative work of women around the world, including gaming art, design, and sound and creative coding. The group also hosts many recruitment expos, to highlight companies in the video game industry that are committed to gender equality in the field.

== See also ==
- Breast physics
- California Department of Fair Employment and Housing v. Activision Blizzard
- Misogyny and mass media § Video games
- Pixelles
- Race and video games
- Riot Games § Allegations over gender discrimination and sexual harassment
- Sexual content in video games
- The Fine Young Capitalists
- Women and video games
- Ubisoft § 2020 sexual misconduct accusations and dismissals
