= Anita Sarkeesian =

Canadian-American feminist media critic (born 1983)

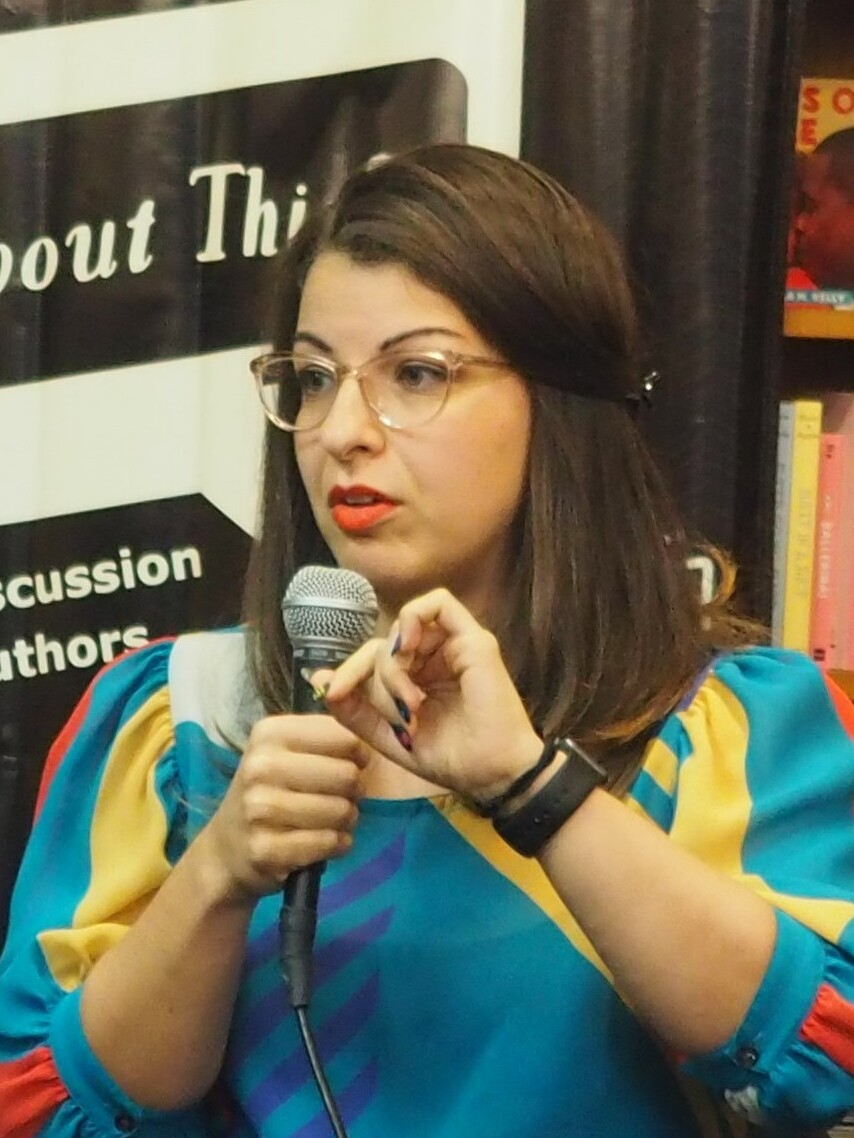
- Sarkeesian in 2018
- Born: 1983 (age 42–43); Toronto, Ontario, Canada
- Education: California State University, Northridge (BA); York University (MA)
- Occupations: Media critic; public speaker
- Website: anitasarkeesian.com

Anita Sarkeesian (/sɑːrˈkiːziən/ sar-KEE-zee-ən; born 1983) is a Canadian-American feminist media critic. She is the founder of Feminist Frequency, a website that hosts videos and commentary analyzing portrayals of women in popular culture. Her video series Tropes vs. Women in Video Games, examines tropes in the depiction of female video game characters.

In 2012, Sarkeesian was targeted by an online harassment campaign following her launch of a Kickstarter project to fund the Tropes vs. Women in Video Games series. The threats and harassment generated widespread media attention, and resulted in the project far exceeding its funding goal. The media coverage placed Sarkeesian at the center of discussions about misogyny in video game culture and online harassment.

She has spoken to TEDxWomen, XOXO Festival, and the United Nations' Broadband Working Group on Gender, and appeared on The Colbert Report discussing her experiences of harassment and the challenge of attempting to improve gender inclusivity in gaming culture and the media.

== Early life and education ==
Sarkeesian was born in 1983, and was raised near Toronto, Canada. Her parents were Iraqi Armenians who emigrated to Canada in the 1970s. The family moved to California when she was a teenager and she identifies as Canadian American. She received a bachelor's degree in communication studies from California State University, Northridge, in 2007 and earned a master's degree in social and political thought from York University in 2010. Her master's thesis is titled I'll Make a Man Out of You: Strong Women in Science Fiction and Fantasy Television.

== Career ==
=== Feminist Frequency ===
Feminist Frequency
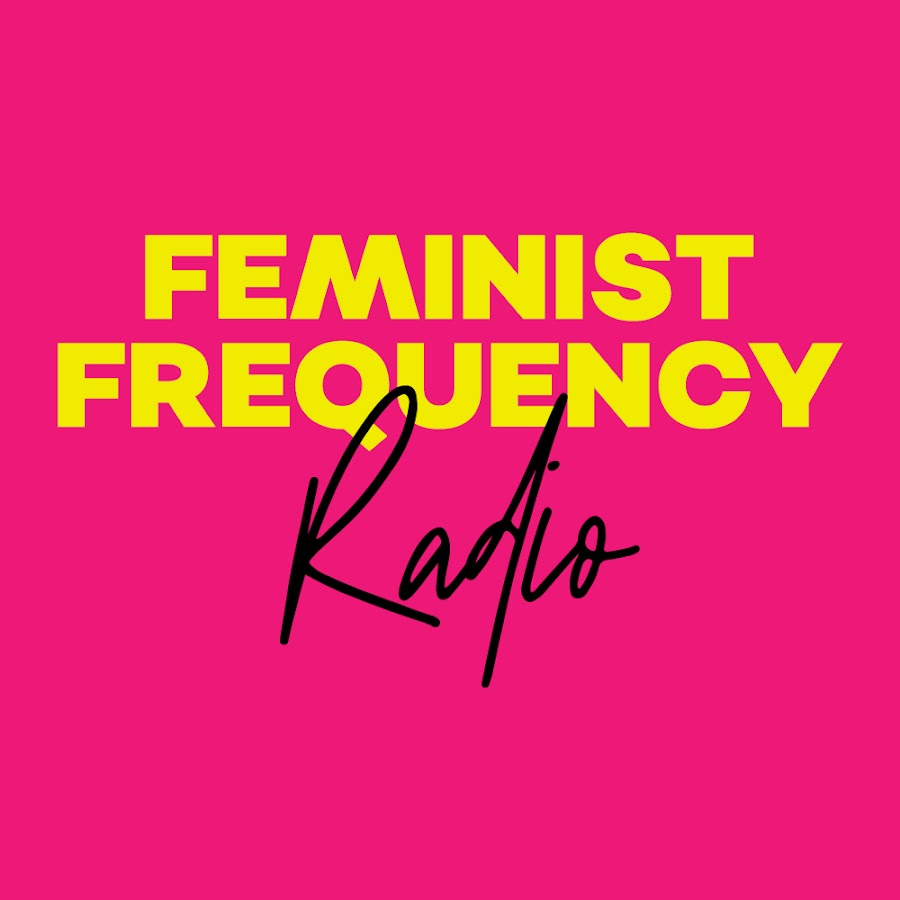
- Feminist Frequency YouTube profile picture as of 2026

YouTube information
- Channel: Feminist Frequency
- Years active: 2009–present
- Genre: Commentary
- Subscribers: 208,000
- Views: 34.5 million
- Last updated: May 23, 2026

Sarkeesian launched the nonprofit organization and website Feminist Frequency in 2009, while a student at York University. She created the site in an effort to create accessible feminist media criticism. Videos created for the site analyzed social and cultural gender structure and popular culture from a feminist standpoint, such as applying the Bechdel test to pictures nominated for the 84th Academy Awards in 2012 and highlighting Lego's role in reinforcing cultural norms.

In 2011, Sarkeesian partnered with Bitch magazine to create the video series Tropes vs. Women. The series examined common tropes in the depiction of women in media with a particular focus on science fiction. The series comprises six videos dedicated to tropes such as the Manic Pixie Dream Girl, women in refrigerators and the Smurfette principle.

In March 2012, Sarkeesian and her blog were listed in the journal Feminist Collections's quarterly column on "E-Sources on Women & Gender". Her blog has been utilized as material for university-level women's studies courses, and she has spoken at universities on the topic of female characters in pop culture.

Sarkeesian was inspired to start a video series on female representation in video games after she was invited to speak to developers at Bungie. On May 17, 2012, she began a Kickstarter campaign to fund a series of short videos that would examine gender tropes in video games. The threats and harassment she received in response generated widespread media attention, and resulted in the project ultimately far exceeding its initial funding goal of $6,000, which it reached in less than a day. The final amount raised was $158,922, over 26 times its initial goal. While stating that the support Sarkeesian has received "stands at a counter" to the harassment, Sal Humphreys and Karen Orr Vered, writing in Television & New Media, suggest that the harassment Sarkeesian received may ultimately serve to discourage other women from following Sarkeesian's lead for fear of being subjected to similar attacks.

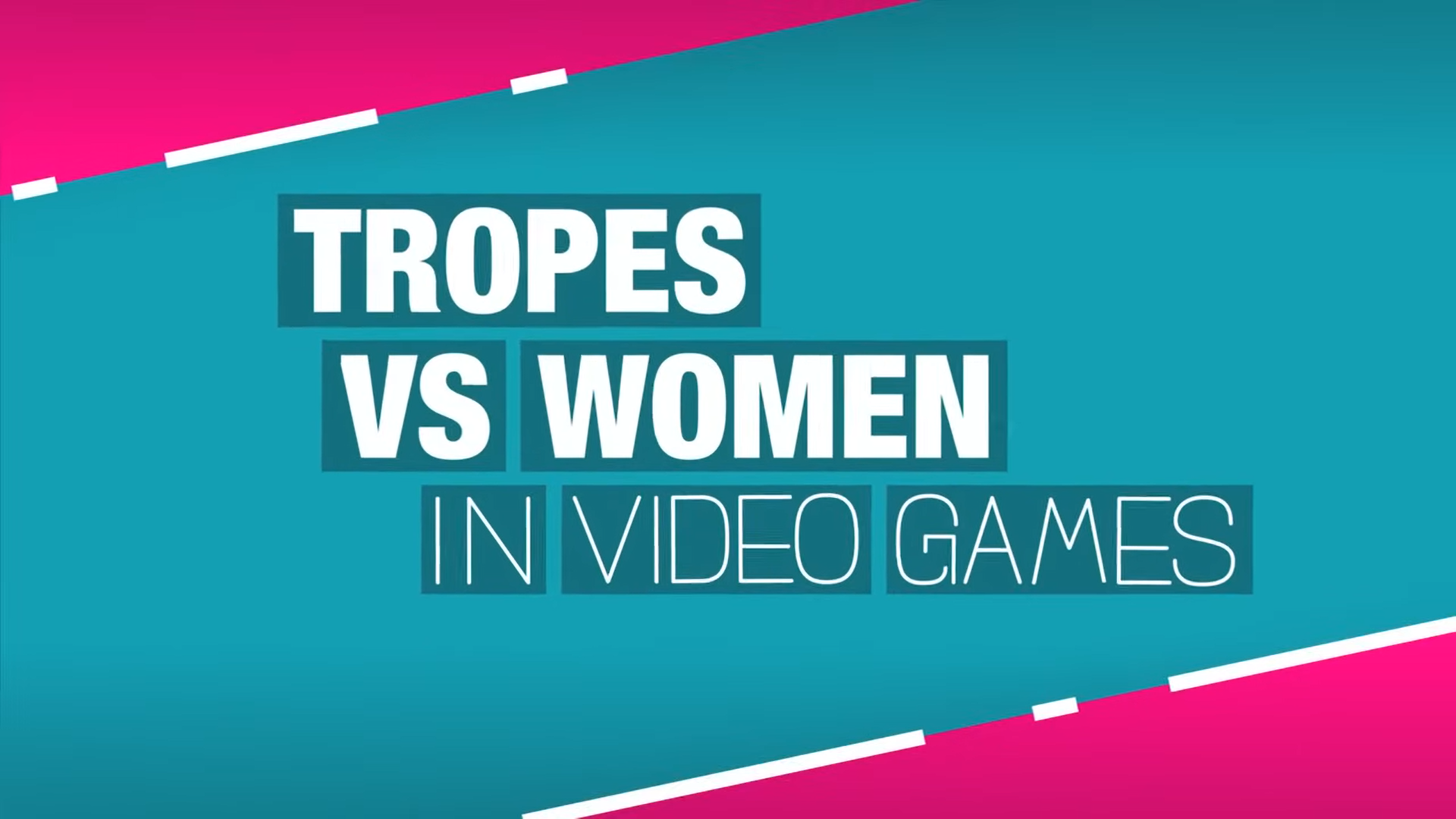
Title card used in the Tropes vs Women videos

Sarkeesian initially planned to release the Tropes vs. Women in Video Games series in 2012 but pushed it back explaining that the additional funding allowed her to expand the scope and scale of the project. The first video in the Tropes vs Women in Video Games series was released on March 7, 2013. The first three videos discuss examples of the "damsel in distress" trope, in which passive and often helpless female characters must be rescued by the male hero. Chris Suellentrop of The New York Times referred to the first four videos of the series as "essential viewing for anyone interested in video games", and cites it as the reason why he asked Nintendo producer Shigeru Miyamoto about the themes of damsels present in his games, to which he responded "I haven't given it a lot of deep thought over the years".

Colin Campbell writes at Polygon that Feminist Frequency has had a demonstrable effect on the games industry, stating, "video games have seen a rise in the number of positive women and minority protagonists and a decrease in the tropes [Sarkeesian] discusses" since the launch of the project. In January 2015, as part of a $300 million effort to increase diversity and inclusivity in the technology sphere, Intel announced it would partner with Feminist Frequency and other groups to help promote increased career opportunities, engagement and positive representation for women and minorities in technology and gaming.

In January 2015, the nonprofit announced they were planning two new video series tackling the "positive" portrayal of women in video games, as well as the "portrayal of masculine identities in games".

In March 2016, Feminist Frequency launched a crowdfunding campaign for an animated video series called Ordinary Women: Daring to Defy History. The planned 5-episode series will explore the lives of historical women such as Ida B. Wells and Emma Goldman. The video series was released in 2017.

In March 2016, Feminist Frequency began a formal partnership with the Crash Override Network, agreeing to serve as its fiscal sponsor. Crash Override is a support group for victims of large scale online abuse formed by game developers Zoë Quinn and Alex Lifschitz in the wake of the GamerGate harassment campaign.

The Tropes vs. Women in Video Games series ended with its final episode, "The Lady Sidekick", posted on April 27, 2017. Sarkeesian announced that Feminist Frequency would produce another series. In March 2019, Feminist Frequency returned with a three part miniseries on Queer Tropes in Video Games that is similar to Tropes vs. Women in Video Games. Sarkeesian gave a talk at the 2022 Game Developers Conference, where she said that making Tropes vs. Women in that era would be "not impossible, but harder," because "the pattern is less egregious."

In August 2023, Sarkeesian announced that the nonprofit would close, citing "exhaustion and burnout", with operations ceasing at the turn of the year. The nonprofit's programs ceased operations in early 2024, while the Feminist Frequency Radio podcast would continue to be presented by co-host Kat Spada; past episodes would remain accessible online, along with Sarkeesian's previous media criticism video series including Tropes vs Women and The FREQ Show.

=== Other work ===
In 2011, Sarkeesian co-authored the essay "Buffy vs. Bella: The Re-Emergence of the Archetypal Feminine in Vampire Stories" for the anthology Fanpires: Audience Consumption of the Modern Vampire. She spoke at conferences and workshops about media criticism and video blogging, and was interviewed by UK Sunday newspaper The Observer in March 2012 about modern media culture, stating: "I think to the extent that it could be creating authentic, human female characters, it is a push towards a more feminist media."

In October 2022, Sarkeesian began a new video series on online streaming service Nebula called That Time When, which "looks at the moments when pop culture and politics collide in modern history". She said, "Given the abuse and vitriol I receive whenever I create media online, releasing my show as a Nebula Original allowed me to make a series that felt more sincere, more playful, and less bogged down with endless counterarguments." The series has nine episodes about topics such as the Satanic Panic, the Hollywood blacklist, Nipplegate, the Dixie Chicks' comments on George W. Bush, the racial politics of Star Trek, the coming out of Ellen DeGeneres, and the films of Lois Weber. The final episode discusses GamerGate and Sarkeesian's own experiences of harassment, which she said she was "really tired of talking about." Sarkeesian is listed in the 2026 video game Slay the Spire II’s credits as a “Consultant.”

== As a target of harassment ==
External media
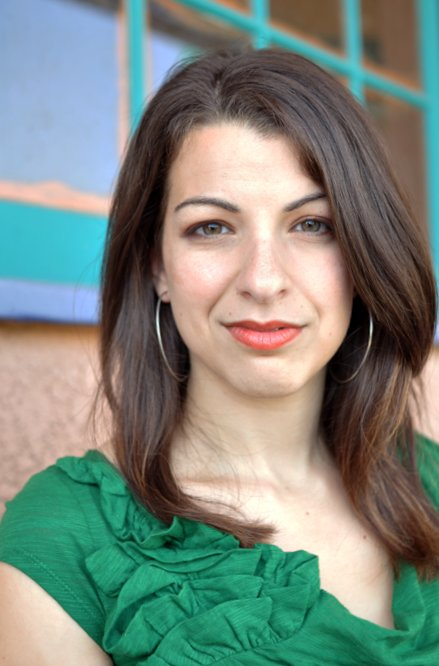
- Sarkeesian's headshot from 2011

Audio
- Anita Sarkeesian, Undaunted, The New Yorker Radio Hour (2016)

Video
- Strategic Butt Coverings – Tropes vs Women in Video Games, Feminist Frequency (2016)
- Anita Sarkeesian at TEDxWomen 2012, 10:29, TEDx (2012)

The Tropes vs Women project triggered a campaign of misogynistic harassment against Sarkeesian that included rape and death threats, hacking of her webpages and social media, and doxing. Attackers posted disparaging comments online, vandalized Sarkeesian's article on Wikipedia with racial slurs and sexual images, and sent Sarkeesian drawings of herself being raped by video game characters.

One attacker created a browser game called Beat Up Anita Sarkeesian, which prompted players to bloody a picture of Sarkeesian by clicking the mouse. Toronto feminist Stephanie Guthrie received death and rape threats for criticizing the Beat Up Anita Sarkeesian game. The resulting criminal trial against critic Gregory Alan Elliott is regarded as having significant implications for online freedom of speech in Canada. Sarkeesian responded to the threats against Guthrie in a statement to the Toronto Standard, condemning the widespread harassment she and other women have faced online. Speaking at TEDxWomen in 2012, Sarkeesian argued that many of her attackers saw harassing her as a game, describing her experience as "accidentally [becoming] the villain of a massively online game in real life".

In March 2014, Sarkeesian was scheduled to speak and receive an award at the 2014 Game Developers Choice Awards. The organizers later revealed that they had received an anonymous bomb threat and that San Francisco police had swept the Moscone Center hall before the event proceeded.

In August 2014, Feminist Frequency issued a new Tropes vs Women in Games episode. This coincided with the ongoing harassment of Zoë Quinn as part of the online harassment campaign known as GamerGate. The increased volume and specificity of the harassment (including death threats) prompted Sarkeesian to leave her home. San Francisco Police confirmed that they had passed the case file to the FBI for investigation.

On October 14, 2014, Sarkeesian and Utah State University received terrorist threats pertaining to her planned lecture at the university the following day. The threats, one of which was issued by a person who claimed to be affiliated with GamerGate, specifically cited the 1989 École Polytechnique massacre in Montreal, Quebec, Canada as inspiration. The university and police did not believe the threats were credible inasmuch as they were consistent with others Sarkeesian had received, but scheduled enhanced security measures nonetheless. Sarkeesian canceled the event, however, feeling the planned security measures were insufficient given that the university could not prohibit handguns in the venue per Utah state law.

The threats resulted in public attention to misogynistic and violent harassment on the Internet, along with the propriety of concealed weapons on university campuses. In an editorial, The Salt Lake Tribune wrote that the threats "would seem to support Sarkeesian's point about a link between some video games and violent attitudes toward females" and called on the state to allow universities "to ban firearms from venues where they are not just inappropriate, but destructive of the mission of an institution of higher learning".

In an August 2015 interview with The Guardian, Sarkeesian remarked of dealing with the pervasive harassment (her "new normal") that older mentors and feminists told her "We were dealing with that, but they were throwing rocks at us." Soraya Murray describes the attack as a "watershed moment" in the "culture war" being fought over representations of women and minorities in video games.

At VidCon 2017, Sarkeesian appeared on a panel discussing online harassment directed towards women. A group of YouTubers and bloggers who produce content critical of feminism and political correctness sat directly in front of the stage and filmed Sarkeesian as part of a targeted harassment campaign against her. Sarkeesian singled out British YouTuber Carl Benjamin, seated in the first row, as a serial harasser of hers. Speaking directly to Benjamin, she said, "I hate to give you attention because you're a garbage human." The event went viral among both critics and supporters of Sarkeesian. Benjamin accused Sarkeesian of abuse and cyberbullying; in a blog post, Sarkeesian wrote:

[Benjamin] makes over $5,000 a month on Patreon for creating YouTube videos that mock, insult and discredit myself and other women online, and he's not alone. He is one of several YouTubers who profit from the cottage industry of online harassment and antifeminism.

VidCon founder Hank Green issued a statement that the group's actions were clear "intimidating behaviour" and apologised for the situation "which resulted in [Sarkeesian] being subjected to a hostile environment that she had not signed up for".

In a retrospective for Polygon in December 2019, Sarkeesian wrote that "GamerGate's real goals were expressed in the explicit racism, sexism, and transphobia of the memes the movement generated, and the posts its supporters wrote on the message boards where they organized and strategized. Later, the flimsiness of the 'ethics in games journalism' pretense would become a mocking meme signifying a bad faith argument. It would almost be funny, if GamerGate hadn't done so much harm, and caused so much lasting trauma." She added that the video game industry was ultimately complicit in GamerGate "through its shameful silence in the face of a reactionary mob of 'gamers'".

In 2020, Sarkeesian launched the Games and Online Harassment Hotline, a free non-profit service that started development in 2019. In 2023, it was announced that the hotline would cease operating in September along with the closure of Feminist Frequency.

== Media appearances ==
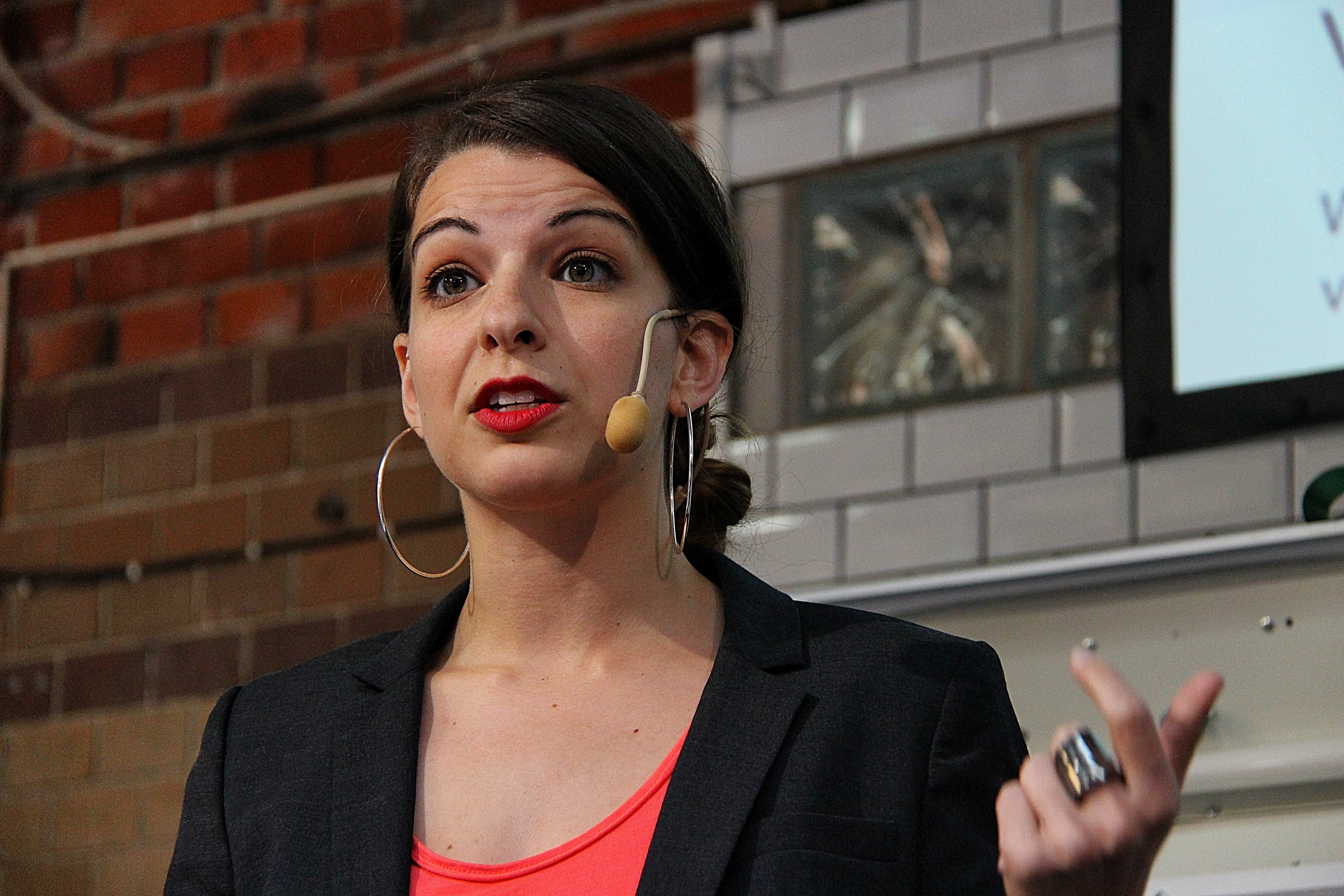
Sarkeesian speaking at Media Evolutions The Conference 2013

Sarkeesian (right) sitting next to Kamala Harris at the Women in the World 2015

Sarkeesian and her work have come to much greater public attention following the announcement of Tropes vs. Women in Video Games and the harassment she subsequently faced. These events helped bring the issue of pervasive sexual harassment in video game culture to mainstream media attention. Discussions occurred in a range of publications and outlets, including The New York Times, The Guardian and New Statesman. Sarkeesian's elevated profile led to speaking engagements on sexual harassment and online communities at the TEDxWomen conference and several universities. Media scholar Soraya Murray calls Sarkeesian emblematic of "a burgeoning organized feminist critique" of stereotyped and objectified portrayals of women in video games.

Speaking at the XOXO Festival in September 2014, Sarkeesian described the allegation that she and other women fabricated harassment as itself being a form of harassment. "Harassment is the background radiation of my life," she later remarked in a Bloomberg Businessweek cover story on her work and the video game industry.

On October 29, 2014, Sarkeesian was interviewed on The Colbert Report where she discussed the harassment she suffered as a result of GamerGate and her views on making video games more inclusive. She told Colbert that video games often portray women in a manner which "reinforces the cultural myth that women are sexual objects" and that her goal is not to censor video games, but to raise awareness of how women can be portrayed in more realistic, less stereotypical ways.

The harassment of Sarkeesian and other women in gaming was featured in the January 14, 2015, edition of Nightline. When asked by ABC News why there was so much anger, she responded "I think it comes from this idea that gaming is a male-dominated space, and that games are for men by men... it's a very misogynist backlash". She appears in the 2015 documentary GTFO.

== Awards and nominations ==
Sarkeesian at the 2014 Game Developers Choice Awards

Sarkeesian's Feminist Frequency blog was highlighted by Feminist Collections and Media Report to Women. In 2012, Gamasutra considered the harassment and success of Feminist Frequency a catalyst that led to new attention on the importance of diversity and inclusion in the gaming culture and industry. They named this call for inclusion one of the "5 trends that defined the game industry in 2012". In 2013, Newsweek magazine and The Daily Beast named Sarkeesian one of their "125 Women of Impact".

In 2014, Sarkeesian received the Ambassador Award at the 14th Annual Game Developers Choice Awards for her work on the representation of women in video games, becoming the first woman to receive the award. She was also nominated for the Ambassador Award at Microsoft's 2014 Women in Gaming Awards for her work.

After the Utah State University death threats, Rolling Stone called her "pop culture's most valuable critic," saying that "the backlash has only made her point for her: Gaming has a problem". In December 2014, The Verge named her as one of "the 50 most important people at the intersection of technology, art, science, and culture". In March 2015, Time magazine included Sarkeesian in its list of the thirty "Most Influential People on the Internet", and in April of that year, chose her for the Time 100, the magazine's annual list of the 100 most influential people in the world. In May 2015, Cosmopolitan included her in its list of the "50 Most Fascinating People on the Internet".

Feminist Frequency won a Peabody Award in the category of "Digital and Interactive Storytelling" in 2022.

== Selected publications ==
- Sarkeesian, Anita; Cross, Katherine (2015). "Your Humanity is in Another Castle: Terror Dreams and the Harassment of Women". In Goldberg, Daniel; Larsson, Linus (eds.). The State of Play: Creators and Critics on Video Game Culture. New York: Seven Stories Press. ISBN 978-1-60980-639-2.
- Sarkeesian, Anita; Adams, Ebony (2018). History vs Women: The Defiant Lives That They Don't Want You to Know. New York: Feiwel & Friends. ISBN 978-1-25014-672-4.
