= Born Sexy Yesterday =

Character trope

"Born Sexy Yesterday" is a trope that describes a character, typically a woman, who is physically attractive yet portrayed as childlike or naive, often with a level of intelligence or maturity that contradicts her appearance or behavior. These characters typically lack real-world experience, creating a dynamic where their sexual appeal contrasts with their innocence and unfamiliarity with social norms. This trope is prevalent in science fiction and gained critical attention after a 2017 video essay by Jonathan McIntosh, a YouTuber known as Pop Culture Detective.

== Overview ==
The Born Sexy Yesterday trope has persisted for decades but has recently gained critical attention, particularly following a 2017 video by YouTuber Jonathan McIntosh, known as Pop Culture Detective. Coined from the 1950 film Born Yesterday, where two men educate a naive showgirl, the term describes a common narrative device in science fiction, among other genres. Female characters are often stunning yet childlike, embodying a paradox of adult sexuality paired with social naivety, and are often even artificially created. They often awaken in new and confusing worlds, relying on male counterparts for guidance.

A notable example is Leeloo from The Fifth Element, who is limited verbally and has been created without adult maturity, despite her hyper-intelligence. Leeloo was crafted to be "perfect" but is portrayed with the naïveté of a young child, yet sexualized without her awareness.

Other examples include characters from Splash and Enchanted, who cater to a male fantasy of innocence and sexual purity, positioning their male guides as "the most extraordinary man" in their lives.

These characters may take forms such as robots, mermaids, or otherworldly beings, consistently displaying childlike innocence despite their mature appearances. While these characters often serve as heroines, their portrayal perpetuates harmful stereotypes about female innocence and male dominance. McIntosh's video highlights the prevalence of the trope in various films, exposing its underlying sexism and paedophilic implications.

=== Characteristics ===
The Born Sexy Yesterday trope features female characters who blend childlike innocence with adult physicality, often serving as love interests for male protagonists. A central element of this trope is the female character's youthfully-minded understanding of her surroundings, which allows the male protagonist to adopt a teacher-like role, guiding her in social norms and romantic interactions. He instructs her on socially acceptable behavior and guides her in romance, despite lacking any qualifications beyond being the first person she becomes close to, leading her to idolize and fall in love with him.

As McIntosh notes:

"The crux of the trope is a fixation on "male superiority." A fixation with holding power over an innocent girl. To make this dynamic socially acceptable, science fiction often places a girl's mind in a sexualized adult woman's body. It’s a fantasy based on the cultural perception, by some, of women who are men's equals in sexual experience and romantic history, and fear of losing the intellectual upper hand to women."

The trope can take various forms, including pixies, and mermaids, ultimately portraying a child whose outward appearance and body resemble an adult's. Despite their innocence, these characters often excel in areas like combat or intellect, appealing to certain segments of the audience, often specifically men. These women often are presented as naïve and unaware of the implications of nudity, romance, or sexual interactions, and the male gaze in these films exploits this innocence. McIntosh highlights that the male lead is often a disenfranchised, “straight, red-blooded” man who struggles to connect with women of equal standing. Meanwhile, the female character, characterized by her naivety, falls for him simply because he exhibits elements of basic human behavior, or is presented as a curiosity that exists beyond her own understanding. The women are depicted as untouched by other men’s attention, which enable the male characters to circumvent the necessity for self-improvement. To crystalize this dynamic, the love interest is often represented as a grown woman.

While the trope thrives in science fiction, it is not confined to it. Although McIntosh examines this trope within the genre, he recognizes its roots in older, racist narratives where white male adventurers "discover" indigenous women. In science fiction, colonialism is replaced by traditional masculine ideologies, with the heterosexual male hero guiding the young woman and educating her about the world, including sex and romance. His infatuation is masked as a teaching role, justifying his actions.

McIntosh likens the Born Sexy Yesterday trope to the Manic Pixie Dream Girl archetype, noting that both involve disenfranchised men meeting naive women. However, he emphasizes that the Born Sexy Yesterday trope intensifies the dynamic by positioning women as submissive rather than equal partners.

McIntosh argues that the Born Sexy Yesterday trope reveals deep male insecurities regarding sex and relationships, reflecting a desire to control female identities and a fear of female agency. This trope embodies an obsession with power over innocent women, normalizing real-world sexism within the sci-fi and fantasy genres.

== Examples ==
The Born Sexy Yesterday trope is prevalent in numerous female characters across various media, including Star Trek, Sheena, Planet of the Apes, Passengers, and Fifty Shades of Grey. While some narratives attempt to subvert its inherent sexism, the trope's presence remains evident prior to any potential subversion.

Historically, the Born Sexy Yesterday trope is not new. The trope's roots can be traced to classic films such as Forbidden Planet and The Time Machine. It appears in Japanese anime, indigenous narratives, and classic Hollywood sci-fi films like The New World. In Forbidden Planet, for instance, the character Alta is deceived into kissing John under the guise of it being essential for her health, echoing manipulative grooming tactics.

Leeloo from The Fifth Element is described by Jonathan McIntosh as "probably the most quintessential example" of the Born Sexy Yesterday trope. As the human vessel of a Supreme Being sent to combat the "Great Evil," her body is celebrated by male characters, with one scientist expressing a desire to photograph her naked form after she is created. Leeloo, unaware of her own sex appeal, inadvertently undresses in public. She doesn’t speak English, instead communicating in childlike, sometimes incomprehensible speech. Korben responds to her naïveté—such as her inability to use a camera—with curious, yet dismissive behavior. While Leeloo is a powerful character capable of great destruction, her obliviousness of the world around her often undermines her agency.

Mihaela Mihailova, an Assistant Professor in the School of Cinema at San Francisco State University, observes that Alita, the cyborg in Alita: Battle Angel, embodies the Born Sexy Yesterday trope in both her design and behavior. After being revived by Dr. Dyson Ido from a scrapyard, Alita's wide-eyed, innocent look emphasizes her naïveté as she navigates her new life with the guidance of her father figure and love interest.

The stereotype of the socially awkward "nerd" is also prevalent in The Big Bang Theory, where characters like Penny and the female guest stars exhibit Born Sexy Yesterday traits while Leonard and Howard embody the dominant creator role.

The trope has also been identified in the Netflix series Stranger Things, where the character Eleven is portrayed as a girl with extraordinary telekinetic powers but has yet to learn to most social norms, or how to speak. Her relationship with Mike Wheeler, a socially awkward nerd, begins with the classic Born Sexy Yesterday moment where she tries to undress in front of him, not knowing the concept of privacy or consent. Then merely days later Mike is shown kissing her despite her limited understanding of social and familial concepts. The Duffers brothers have cited Nyu, the protagonist of the anime Elfen Lied, as an influence for Eleven's character. Nyu is a classic representation of the Born Sexy Yesterday trope, as the medium of anime is rife with this trope. Nyu is a woman with violent powerful abilities and is housed by the main male character who has a romantic and sexual dynamic with her despite her infantile understanding of the world (a product of her brain damage). Film critics have also gone on to cite Mike and Eleven’s relationship as reflecting elements of the Born Sexy Yesterday framework.

=== Male representations ===
The Born Sexy Yesterday trope can also manifest in reverse, although male representations within the trope's framework are scarce, given its connections to insecurities surrounding masculinity. Typically, these male characters are depicted as naïve and socially awkward, making them less attractive as sexual interests. Unlike their female counterparts, they are not objectified; their ineptitude is framed humorously rather than pitiably. In films like Big and Blast from the Past, male characters display similar traits but often become the punchlines. This discrepancy may arise from the general lack of appeal for women regarding inexperienced adolescent boys. While films such as Edward Scissorhands and The Shape of Water feature male characters with naïveté, they lack the sexualized or romanticized portrayal characteristic of female Born Sexy Yesterday figures.

Hot Frosty, a film about a snowman coming to life, is an example of a movie in which the Born Sexy Yesterday trope is applied to a male character without losing its highly sexualized aspects.

In The Rocky Horror Show and its film adaptation, the titular Rocky is brought to life onscreen for the sake of sexually pleasuring his creator, admitting in the musical number "Rose Tint My World" to being "just seven hours old" and that "[his] libido hasn't been controlled". His arc is similar to that of the traditional female example of the trope, being shown affection, pity, and an "enlightening" influence by the female lead Janet, although the work's themes of gender-subversion and Rocky's status as a side character make it more of a subversive example than an archetypical one.

== See also ==
- Damsel in distress – Trope and stock character in storytelling
- Final girl – Trope in slasher horror films
- Manic pixie dream girl – Female stock character who acts as a love interest
