= Television & New Media =

- Discipline: Media studies
- Language: English
- Edited by: Diane Negra; Jonathan Corpus Ong

Publication details
- History: 2000–present
- Publisher: SAGE Publications (United States)
- Frequency: 8/year
- Impact factor: 1.135 (2017)

Standard abbreviations
- ISO 4: Telev. New Media

Indexing
- ISSN: 1527-4764 (print); 1552-8316 (web)
- LCCN: 99009518
- OCLC no.: 231901154

Links
- Journal homepage; Online access; Online archive

Television & New Media is a peer-reviewed academic journal that publishes papers in the field of communication. The journal's editors are Diane Negra (University College Dublin) and Jonathan Corpus Ong (University of Massachusetts at Amherst). It has been in publication since 2000 and is currently published by SAGE Publications.

== Scope ==
Television & New Media aims to highlight the most recent developments in the critical study of television and new media. The journal covers interdisciplinary research into topics such as new media forms, audiences and consumers and globalization. Television & New Media also aims to address issues of economics, politics, culture and power and their relevance to new media forms, industries and contexts.

== Abstracting and indexing ==
Television & New Media is abstracted and indexed in, among other databases: SCOPUS, EBSCO databases, ProQuest databases, and the Social Sciences Citation Index. According to the Journal Citation Reports, its 2017 impact factor is 1.135, ranking it 49 out of 85 journals in the category 'Communication'.
