= Tropes vs. Women in Video Games =

YouTube video series

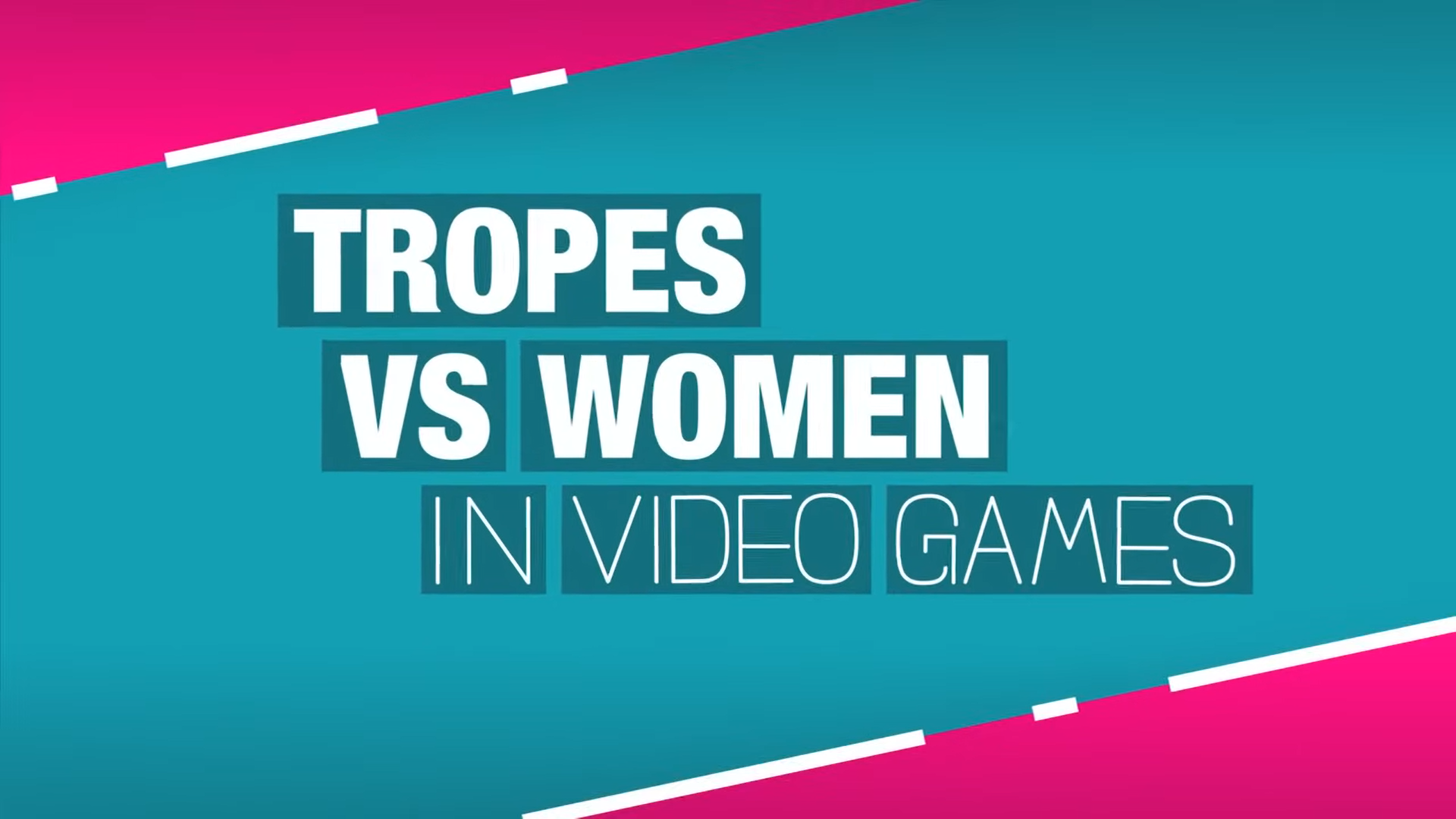
- Title card used in the videos
- Genre: Video game culture
- Directed by: Anita Sarkeesian
- Presented by: Anita Sarkeesian
- Theme music composer: Matt Joynt, Nathan Sandberg
- Country of origin: United States
- Original language: English
- No. of episodes: 18

Production
- Producer: Jonathan McIntosh

Original release
- Network: YouTube
- Release: March 7, 2013 – April 27, 2017

Tropes vs. Women in Video Games is a YouTube video series created by Anita Sarkeesian examining gender representation in video games. The series was financed via crowdfunding, and came to widespread attention when its Kickstarter campaign triggered a wave of online harassment against Sarkeesian, causing her to flee her home at one point. Released on the channel Feminist Frequency between March 2013 and April 2017, the series consists of eighteen episodes.

The series explores and critiques the tropes used to represent women in video games. Sarkeesian argues that most video games cater to a straight male audience, such as by featuring primarily male playable characters and objectifying female characters. She also highlights examples of video games that feature more well-rounded representations of women. Critical response to the series was generally positive.

== Background ==
In 2009, Sarkeesian started her website Feminist Frequency with the intention of creating feminist media criticism accessible to the younger generation. In 2011 she collaborated with the feminist magazine Bitch to create a YouTube video series for her site titled "Tropes vs. Women", which examined tropes in film, television and other popular media that she believes reinforce damaging stereotypes about women. After the success of "Tropes vs. Women", Sarkeesian began planning a follow-up series. In 2012, video game studio Bungie invited her to speak about developing strong female characters; the engagement was well received and inspired her to think more about games. Sarkeesian determined that some tropes she planned to discuss in her new series, such as the "Damsel in Distress", were particularly pervasive in video games, and decided to devote the second series specifically to games.

In May 2012, Sarkeesian announced she would crowdfund her series on "Tropes vs. Women in Video Games" through Kickstarter. She launched the Kickstarter project on May 17, 2012, with an initial goal of $6,000 to produce five videos of 10–20 minutes in length. The project reached its target in less than 24 hours, and Sarkeesian promptly set a series of "stretch" goals to fund additional installments.

The Kickstarter project also triggered a campaign of misogynist harassment from segments of video game culture. Attackers sent Sarkeesian death and rape threats, hacked her webpages and social media, vandalized her article on Wikipedia, and posted disparaging comments online. One attacker created a computer game that allowed players to punch a picture of Sarkeesian. Supporters responded by donating to the Kickstarter project. By the time the campaign closed on June 15, it had raised $158,922 from 6,968 donors, considerably higher than the original goal. The events generated substantial press coverage and helped bring the issue of pervasive sexism in video gaming to wider attention.

== Production and impact ==
After the close of the Kickstarter, Sarkeesian decided to redevelop her concept for the series, writing that the additional funding allowed her to "expand the scope, scale and production values of the project". In January 2013, Sarkeesian launched a Tumblr web page called "Bits of Tropes Vs. Women in Games" previewing samples of the first video.

The first video in the Tropes vs Women in Video Games series, "Damsels in Distress (Part 1)", was released on March 7, 2013. The delay led some critics to question how she was using the money. Jesse Singal of The Boston Globe wrote that the production values of the new series were high, saying "so far, she appears to have put the money to good use." Fruzsina Eördögh of ReadWrite also stated that the production quality of the videos had increased from her previous works, but suggested Sarkeesian disclose her plan for the rest of her Kickstarter money to "knock down the only legitimate point" from her critics and provide guidance for other video bloggers.

Parts 2 and 3 of the series were released on May 28 and August 1, 2013. The second video was briefly removed due to abuse of YouTube's "flag" system, though it was quickly restored. Part 5 was released on June 17, 2014, focusing on the use of women in shallow background roles or as sex objects.

In January 2015, Feminist Frequency released its end of year report outlining its continued plans for the Tropes series and announced they were planning two new video series tackling the "positive" portrayal of women in video games, as well as the "portrayal of masculine identities in games", while saying that it had released only 6 of the originally planned 12 videos to this point due to increased commitments to public appearances and media interaction.

The series ended with its final episode, "The Lady Sidekick", posted on April 27, 2017. Sarkeesian announced that Feminist Frequency would produce another series.

In March 2019, Feminist Frequency returned with a three part miniseries on Queer Tropes in Video Games that is similar to Tropes vs. Women in Video Games.

According to Axios, Sarkeesian reflected that, in 2022, there were fewer examples of sexist tropes and "the pattern is less egregious".

== Episodes ==
No.	Title	Original release date	YouTube views (millions; as of February 4, 2025)
1	"Damsel in Distress: Part 1"	March 7, 2013	3.47
This video discusses the "Damsel in Distress" trope, in which a passive female must be rescued by a male hero. It traces the formula's history from its origins in ancient literature to its establishment in early video games, particularly the influential Mario and Zelda franchises.
2	"Damsel in Distress: Part 2"	May 28, 2013	1.49
This video explores "dark and edgy" variants of the Damsel in Distress trope in 21st-century video games, such as the "disposable woman", the "mercy killing" and the "woman in the refrigerator", which debase female characters to motivate or empower the male protagonist.
3	"Damsel in Distress: Part 3"	August 1, 2013	1.06
This installment examines the "Dude in Distress" twist on the damsel trope and "ironic sexism" in retro-inspired modern games. It then discusses games and concepts that deconstruct the traditional damsel formula.
4	"Ms. Male Character"	November 18, 2013	1.36
This video covers the "Ms. Male Character" trope, in which female characters are merely variants of established male characters with stereotypical female identifiers, such as Ms. Pac-Man. It further discusses the "Smurfette Principle", where stereotypical feminine traits are all that distinguish token female characters within diverse male groups.
5	"Women as Background Decoration: Part 1"	June 16, 2014	1.04
This video examines "Women as Background Decoration", a trope where sexually objectified female non-playable characters serve as titillating set dressing or as minimally interactive props for sex or violence, generally to add an "edgy, gritty or racy" aspect to the game world.
6	"Women as Background Decoration: Part 2"	August 25, 2014	1.26
This episode focuses on variants of the "Women as Background Decoration" trope that combine both sexualization and violence in the portrayal of female characters, often in order to paint more significant male characters as brutal or villainous.
7	"The Scythian - Positive Female Characters in Video Games"	March 31, 2015	0.38
The first in a series of videos on positive female characters, this installment discusses the Scythian from Superbrothers: Sword & Sworcery EP.
8	"Jade - Positive Female Characters in Video Games"	May 12, 2015	0.31
Continuing the series of videos on positive female characters, this installment discusses Jade from Beyond Good & Evil.
9	"Women as Reward"	August 31, 2015	0.66
This episode discusses various incarnations of the pervasive "Women as Reward" trope, which presents women or their bodies as rewards for game actions. Sarkeesian argues that the trope, which caters to a presumed straight male audience, is part of a pattern of male sexual entitlement in the wider culture.
10	"Women as Reward - Special DLC Mini-Episode"	September 14, 2015	0.50
An addendum to the previous episode, this video focuses on the use of women as rewards for exchanging real money in the context of downloadable content and pre-order incentives.
11	"Strategic Butt Coverings"	January 19, 2016	0.80
In this episode, Sarkeesian argues that video games often objectify female protagonists by sexualizing their buttocks via camera angles and costume choices; in contrast, male protagonists' buttocks are typically de-emphasized or hidden by clothing and other "Strategic Butt Coverings".
12	"Body Language & The Male Gaze"	March 31, 2016	0.32
This video discusses how games' character animation often sexualizes females; this is one way games are typically designed around the male gaze.
13	"Lingerie is not Armor"	June 6, 2016	0.38
This video discusses the sexualized outfits often worn by female game characters, and explores the differences between sexualization and empowerment.
14	"Are Women Too Hard To Animate?"	July 27, 2016	0.42
This installment discusses the dearth of female stock enemies and multiplayer characters in games. Where they do exist, they are often set apart through sexualization and stereotypical identifiers, though other games present them on comparable footing to males.
15	"All the Slender Ladies: Body Diversity in Video Games"	September 1, 2016	0.48
This video discusses how female characters tend to have similarly slender, conventionally attractive physiques, compared to the much wider range of male body shapes.
16	"Sinister Seductress"	September 28, 2016	0.19
This episode explores several ancient tropes that present femaleness as inherently threatening: "Grotesquely Female" characters, whose female traits are repulsive; the "Sinister Seductress", whose sexuality is dangerous; and characters who combine both tropes.
17	"Not Your Exotic Fantasy"	January 31, 2017	0.28
This episode explores the ways games exoticize indigenous or "tribal" characters with long-standing racist and sexist stereotypes.
18	"The Lady Sidekick"	April 27, 2017	0.26
This episode explores the limited roles games generally assign to female sidekicks.

== Reception ==
=== Harassment and response ===
The harassment continued as the series went into production. When the second video of the series was flagged on YouTube for "containing inappropriate material" by challengers of the series, it was temporarily blocked. However, Sarkeesian appealed the block and it was lifted. Due to her previous experiences, Sarkeesian disabled comments and ratings for her videos.

In August 2014, after the release of the sixth episode of the video series, which focused on the "Women as Background Decoration" trope, harassment of Sarkeesian had reached such levels that she announced that a threat drove her out of her home. She was quoted as having posted on Twitter, "Some very scary threats have just been made against me and my family. Contacting authorities now", followed by a later tweet, "I'm safe. Authorities have been notified. Staying with friends tonight. I'm not giving up. But this harassment of women in tech must stop!"

=== Critical reception ===
Nate Carpenter reviewed the "Damsel in Distress" video positively in the journal Women & Language. Carpenter commended the series for rendering the ideas and language of media criticism into a format accessible for a general audience. He judged it limited in failing to analyze the cultural milieu that perpetuates damaging tropes, but overall found it an "intelligent, engaging, and entertaining point of departure" for viewers interested in media studies.

Chris Suellentrop of The New York Times referred to the first four videos of the series as "essential viewing for anyone interested in video games". The series inspired Suellentrop to ask Nintendo designer Shigeru Miyamoto about his frequent use of helpless "damsels" in his games; Miyamoto responded, "I haven't given it a lot of deep thought over the years." Jesse Singal of The Boston Globe wrote that the videos' strength lies in Sarkeesian's "deft[ness] at anticipating rebuttals", and said such work was important in challenging the industry to move away from overused tropes. In 2013, Newsweek magazine named Sarkeesian one of its "125 Women of Impact", writing that regardless of the harassment, "Damsel in Distress" was "racking up accolades".

Paul Dean of IGN described the videos as an analysis of sexism that, while possibly "difficult to swallow" for some video game players, did not attack gaming itself but only "disappointing" stories in games. Maddy Myers of Paste stated that Sarkeesian faces difficulties due to the unrealistic expectations and intense scrutiny placed on her and other female video game critics. Writing in Entertainment Weekly, Joshua Rivera said the series "illustrates in painstaking detail" video game designers' penchant for using violence against women as narrative shorthand, calling it "lazy storytelling", and said Sarkeesian's work is valuable because "as video games mature as a medium, they need to be held to the kind of scrutiny we hold other art forms to."

Chicago Sun-Times columnist Neil Steinberg wrote that Sarkeesian's attackers effectively deter legitimate critique of her work, as many commentators are wary of being associated with the harassment. Ian Bogost and Anna Anthropy have also observed that the abuse directed at Sarkeesian makes it harder for legitimate criticism of her work to be heard.

Speaking about "Women as Background Decoration", Steinberg wrote that Sarkeesian cites no evidence for her claims that video games facilitate violence against women, though he commended her activism in combating sexism. Noah Berlatsky wrote in Newsweek that some sex workers have objected to Sarkeesian's discussions of video game portrayals of their industry, particularly her use of terminology that they believe plays into the objectification she criticizes. Cathy Young wrote in RealClearPolitics that the Tropes vs. Women videos are "full of selective and skewed analysis" that overlooks evidence that may challenge Sarkeesian's arguments.

Tropes vs. Women's claim that women characters fit narrow roles in Arkane Studios's 2012 game Dishonored initially made the studio defensive, but led the team to realize that the game's female characters were solely servants, prostitutes, witches, queens, girls, or mistresses, though this was not their intention. As a result, the development team decided to expand Emily Kaldwin's role as a playable main character in Dishonored 2.

== See also ==
- List of video game crowdfunding projects
