= Freedom of expression in Canada =

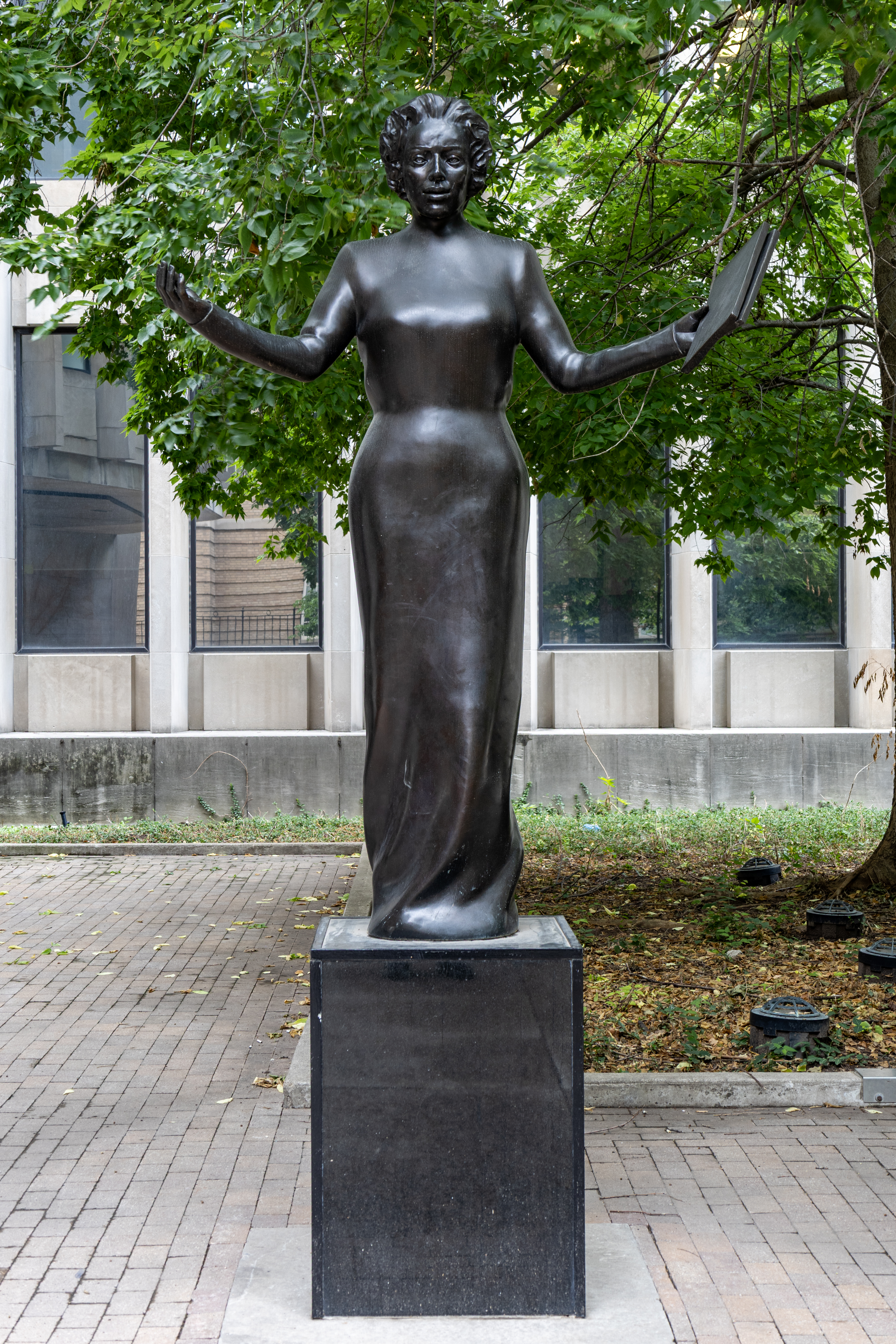
"Freedom of Expression" by Marlene Hilton Moore (2012), McMurtry Gardens of Justice, Toronto

Freedom of expression in Canada is protected as a "fundamental freedom" by Section 2 of the Canadian Charter of Rights and Freedoms (enacted 1982); however, in practice the Charter permits the government to enforce "reasonable" limits censoring speech. Hate speech, obscenity, and defamation are common categories of restricted speech in Canada.

== Legislation ==
Section 2(b) of the Canadian Charter of Rights and Freedoms establishes the right to freedom of expression, and the Supreme Court of Canada has interpreted this right in a very broad fashion. The Court has said that any act that is intended to convey a message is protected under section 2(a) but that this does not include acts that have a violent form. However, section 1 of the Charter establishes that "reasonable" limits can be placed on the right if those limits are prescribed by law and can be "demonstrably justified in a free and democratic society".

== Reasonable limits ==
Freedom of expression in Canada is not absolute; section 1 of the Charter allows the government to pass laws that limit free expression so long as the limits are "reasonable and can be justified in a free and democratic society". Hate speech (which refers to the advocacy and incitement of genocide or violence against a particular defined racial, ethnic, gender, sexual, religious or other identifiable group), and obscenity (a broad term referring to, among other things, literature that is unreasonable, dangerous or intensely inappropriate to society at large, such as child sexual abuse material or fraudulent medication intended to promote sexual virility), are two examples that gain significant attention from the media and in public discourse.

In the province of Quebec, freedom of expression is restricted in the interest of protecting the French language. Outdoor commercial signage may only use English text if it is half the size of the French text under the Charter of the French language, or businesses can face financial penalties. The Supreme Court ruled the signage regulation a "reasonable" limit on the freedom of expression.

== Canadian libel and defamation law ==
Limits on speech were incorporated in the criminal code in relation to treason, sedition, blasphemous and defamatory libel, disruption of religious worship, hate propaganda, spreading false news, public mischief, obscenity, indecency and other forms.

— Dominique Clément

Libel involves publication in some permanent form such as writing in a book or newspaper. Defamation is a tort that gives a person the right to recover damages for injury due to publication of words that were intended to lower a person's character. The law encourages the media to publish with caution, to avoid any forms of libel and to respect a person's freedom of expression.

"Defamatory libel" is a criminal offence under the Criminal Code. Subsection 298(1) defines defamatory libel as "a matter published, without lawful justification or excuse, that is likely to injure the reputation of any person by exposing him to hatred, contempt or ridicule, or that is designed to insult the person of or concerning whom it is published." Section 300 prohibits the publication of defamatory libels that the publisher "knows is false." Section 301 prohibits the publication of any defamatory libel, but this section has been found unconstitutional as it could criminalize the publication of matters that are true.

For example, James Keegstra, an antisemite who taught Holocaust denial to schoolchildren in Alberta, was convicted and prosecuted for hate speech in 1984.

== Censorship of media ==
In the 1970s, the Canadian national security apparatus abused its surveillance powers to illegally suppress left-leaning press outlets through arson, breaking and entering, and theft.

Censorship redefines the idea of freedom of speech as a public right rather than a private one. Senator Keith Davey supported this view in 1981, writing in The Globe and Mail: "Too many publishers harbour the absurd notion that freedom of the press is something they own...of course the exact opposite is the case. Press freedom is the right of the people."

The emergence of the internet as a major site of media distribution opened up a new avenue for state censorship; especially as Canadians are heavy users of the internet. In 2007, the Associate Deputy Minister of National Defence under Prime Minister Stephen Harper asserted in Parliament that the Canadian government was working with the American National Security Agency (NSA) and other such agencies to "master the internet". In such an effort, Canada's government has participated in the securitization of the internet. "Securitization" is a phenomenon wherein threats to state power are characterized as threats to "the people", legitimating otherwise impermissible acts in the name of protecting the security of the nation.

Internet censorship may also be undertaken by the corporations that control access—Internet service providers (ISPs). In 2005, a major Canadian ISP, Telus, blocked access to a website set up to publicize the views of a labour union in conflict with the company. The Canadian Telecommunications Act prohibits carriers controlling the content they carry for the public; however Telus argued that it acted within the law, citing its contractual power to block certain sites. The block incidentally affected hundreds of unrelated websites and was removed after attracting public criticism.

Compared to the United States, Canada's regulatory environment is markedly protective of net neutrality. This is credited to the country's regulatory structure, existing laws, bipartisan agreement on the issue, and the uncompetitive nature of the Canadian telecom market, which necessitates tight regulation to avoid abuses.

=== Front de libération du Québec crisis ===
After the Front de libération du Québec (FLQ) crisis, many attacks were made against the press, suggesting that the media were irresponsible in the way they elaborated rumours during a time of crisis. Criticism reached such highs that after Pierre Laporte’s death on October 17, 1970, the Liberal Party whip, Louis-Philippe Lacroix accused the journalists of being responsible for the death. Secretary of State Pelletier and the Chairman of the Canadian Radio-Television Commission (CRTC) discussed ways of achieving restraint regulations but concluded it would lead to accusations of censorship. The War Measures Act was invoked and CBC news reports in Ottawa received instructions that they were to broadcast only stories that were attributed to an identifiable source, retrain comments from the opposition parties, and to not allow their names to be identified with political statements. It was decided that the Secretary of State should see that private and public sectors of the media were accepting the government decisions. Program Secretary to the Prime Minister, J. Davey, thought the government should concentrate on four areas—one being for the Strategic Operations Centre to continue monitoring the media from week to week.

== Associations and controls ==
Communications control institutions are governmental agencies that regulate, may change the media, regulations, and new regulatory bodies. In 1982, Prime Minister Pierre Trudeau said: "When the media do not discipline themselves, the state steps in". There are some inter-media control institutions that regulate themselves to avoid being regulated by the government such as: The Canadian Association of Broadcasters, the Ontario Press Council, publishers associations, and advertising groups.

National Media associations, many newspapers, magazines, and major retail chains have supported the Canadian Code of Advertising Standards. The Canadian Radio-Television Telecommunication Commission (CRTC), must approve all scripts for broadcasting advertisements of food, drugs, and cosmetic products over Canadian stations. In Ontario, the Liquor License Board, under the Ministry of Consumer and Commercial Relations, publishes a book listing what can and cannot be published in print and what can be broadcast in advertising for wine, beer, and cider products. All commercials that are intended for children under 12 years of age must follow the Broadcast Code for Advertising to Children and is managed by the Children's Committee of the Advertising Standards Council.

Ontario, British Columbia, and Alberta regulate the use of the title "engineer" and impose penalties of up to $10,000 for a first offence and $25,000 thereafter on the use of the title or related language or seals by those not accredited by the relevant provincial engineering society, regardless of qualification.

== Books ==
What can and cannot be published in books raises questions of free speech and tolerance. In 1962, D.H Lawrence's Lady Chatterley's Lover faced a court decision questioning if it should be banned. The case challenged the federal government's obscenity laws under the criminal code. The book frequently used the word ‘fuck’ and used detailed descriptions of adultery which insulted some readers. The argument was made that the book was obscene, faced issues with obscenity and would corrupt and degrade readers. The rules on censorship by the federal government were not clear and in 1962, the Supreme Court of Canada ruled that the book could continue to be published and found Lady Chatterley’s Lover not obscene.

Mark Steyn’s 2006 book about the Muslim Diaspora in the West, America Alone, was the subject of a complaint from Mohamed Elmasry, head of the Canadian Islamic Congress, stating that the article "discriminates against Muslims on the basis of their religion. It exposes Muslims to hatred and contempt due to their religion". The complaint against Steyn and Maclean's magazine, which excerpted the book when it was published in 2006, was heard before three human rights commissions: Ontario's, which declared it lacked jurisdiction; British Columbia's, which dismissed the complaint; and the Canadian Human Rights Commission, which dismissed the federal complaint without referring the matter to a tribunal. This case has been cited as a motivating factor in the repeal of section 13 of the Canadian Human Rights Act, legislation that permitted federal human-rights complaints regarding "the communication of hate messages by telephone or on the Internet".

== Television ==
By the early 1990s, Canada was the second largest exporter of audiovisual products after the United States. The Canadian Statute of 1968 added to the obligations of broadcasters that Canadian broadcasting should promote national unity, and that broadcasters must obey the laws respecting libel, obscenity, etc.

In 2004, broadcast carriers were to monitor foreign stations at all times and delete any content that may go against the Canadian Charter of Rights and Freedoms. Restrictions were placed on the broadcasting license for Al-Jazeera, an Arabic-language news network, by the Canadian Radio-Television and Telecommunications Commission (CRTC).

On January 11, 1982, the Inuit Broadcasting Corporation (IBC) began airing television programs across the Northwest Territories and Northern Quebec. For almost a decade, Inuit communities received mostly English-language programming which raised a concern because many people in the North did not understand English. Therefore, Inuit did not share the same cultural orientation and could not identify freely with their traditions or of southern Canada.

Inuit Tapirisat began a three-year Anik B Project name Inukshuk. The Inukshuk Project linked six communities in three Arctic regions by satellite through one-way video and two-way audio. Inukshuk aired teleconferencing, live and pre-taped programs and initiated the concept of an Inuktitut television network. The Inuit Broadcasting Corporation assures more Inuktitut programming on television and Inuit have increasing access to information. Inuit today are familiar with the role of communications on history and the process of contemporary development—cultural stability was strengthened because new electronic media allowed Inuit adaptation of their own institutions and participation was brought to the North.

== Internet ==
The Internet has become the gates of communication whether it is through interacting with each other or providing a wide selection of information to the public. Free speech and the use of the Internet ties with the capability of governments restricting free expression and the use of the Internet. Although the Internet seems an innovative and sure form of media, it is potentially associated with irresponsible speech and dangers with it. A 2008 study by the National Research Council of Canada broadly elaborated on user-generated video and the prevalence of the internet as potentially meaningful for civil society and the development of free expression through digital means in Atlantic Canada.

Richard Posner, an American jurist and legal theorist, identifies four means of publication:

1. Anonymity: The Internet permits users and creators of communications to remain hidden. This makes it far easier to produce, create and consume false, illegal, and dangerous material such as child pornography or hate speech.
2. Lack of quality control: Almost anyone can post almost anything on the Internet. On the Internet unsubstantiated assertions are as easily published as well-researched articles.
3. Global potential audience: The Internet provides access to millions of potential readers and viewers across the world. This can magnify any harm caused by speech.
4. Antisocial people find their soul mates: People with odd, eccentric, subversive, and dangerous views can find each other very easily on the Internet. Such people become emboldened not only to express their ideas, but also to act upon them, their self-confidence bolstered by membership in a community of believers. This can bring dangers of people, such as pedophiles.

The Internet has brought concerns about the limits of free speech that copyright law imposes. This can become a restriction on freedom of speech if a person wishes to use work without proper permission. Copyright protects the words and images used to portray the ideas but it does not protect the ideas themselves. When it comes to any restrictions on free speech there needs to be a valid justification for it, but the case of copyright seems to override the idea that it is against free speech—rather a solution to the protection of people's words and images.

Internet providers have laws against hate messages and if sites violate these terms they become shut down. Bernard Klatt was the owner of an ISP named Fairview Technology Centre Ltd in Oliver, British Columbia. In 1998, Klatt was identified as a host of multiple websites associated with hate speech, neo-Nazi organizations, the Toronto-based Heritage Front, the World Church of the Creator, and the French Charlemagne Hammerhead Skinheads. Local businesses, schools, students and government agencies had easy access to the racist sites because Fairview Technology was their service provider. The Hate Crimes Unit established by the government in British Columbia examined the complaints against Fairview, and required Fairview to accept full legal liability for the material on the sites; Klatt then sold the Internet service to another company.

The case of R v Elliott is believed to be the first instance of a Canadian being prosecuted for speech via Twitter, an online digital forum, with potential implications for online freedom of speech in Canada. The Ontario Court of Justice later dismissed the charges due to a lack of evidence and criminal intent, finding that Gregory Alan Elliot engaged in limited legitimate and free debate, although potentially vulgar and obscene. In addition, it was asserted that those who create hashtags on Twitter, do not ultimately control the tweets utilizing said hashtags, and that the prosecution's claims partly rested on those impersonating Elliot. Elliot could not be found guilty for actions not committed by himself.

== Pornography ==
Pornography presents a difficult challenge for anyone who believes in freedom of expression. Should pornography be tolerated, in all its manifestations, provided that no one is directly harmed in its making: or are there more important values at stake here than freedom?

— Nigel Warburton, Free Speech: A Very Short Introduction

Canadian feminist Wendy McElroy argues for the toleration of pornography. In her book, XXX: A Woman’s Right to Pornography (1995), she believes that women (and men) are free to make up their own minds about their use of pornography and should not be forbidden access to it. If this is true, then pornography should be of some importance since it allows its users to learn about themselves and is part of the principle of free speech. Some believe that the law should protect values and that anything that may corrupt or undermine these values should be banned by the law. However, those in favour of defending free speech believe that any restriction must strongly be based on more than just a reaction of disgust and hatred.

The approach by the Supreme Court on free expression has been that in deciding whether a restriction on freedom of expression is justified, the harms done by the particular form of expression must be weighed against the harm that would be done by the restriction itself. This makes the justification of limits of free expression difficult to determine. Those who are against pornography argue that pornography is basically treated as defamation rather than as discrimination. As Catharine MacKinnon, a feminist and activist based in the United States, says: "It is conceived in terms of what it says, which is imagined more or less effective or harmful as someone then acts on it, rather than in terms of what it does. Fundamentally, in this view, a form of communication cannot, as such, do anything bad except offend". Pornography also raises issues concerning rape, violation of women and child pornography.

== Free speech in times of crisis ==
Communication has an importance in times of crisis to warn communities of disasters and help follow the impact of it. The terms of Canada's renewed Official Secrets Act causes fears in Canadian media in which they may not be free to report on abuses in the national security sphere because they could be prosecuted. The Canadian attitude to criminalizing speech associated with terrorism has so far been somewhat careful. Canada amended its 2001 Anti-terrorism Bill to provide that "for a greater certainty, the expression of a political, religious, or ideological thought, belief or opinion" will not constitute a terrorist activity unless the expression satisfies the other definition of terrorist activities. Canada did increase the ability to seize and remove hate propaganda from the Internet and new penalties for damage to religious property in connection to terrorism and hate speech.

Despite the War Measures Act, the federal cabinet has power to censor the media by declaring a war emergency or an international emergency. The Emergencies Act does require that the acknowledgment of an emergency be presented before Parliament within seven days where the Parliament can have a chance to revoke it. Julian Sher, president of the 1000-member Canadian Association of Journalists, predicted that the media would launch a court challenge if the Charter of Rights was violated. However, cases in the past have seen courts approving military censorship. For example, during the Canadian army's confrontation with Mohawk warriors at Oka, Quebec, there were restrictions on the media including the cutoff of cellular telephones. In 1970, during the October crisis in Quebec, the War Measures Act was imposed and the media were not allowed to publish the manifestos of the Front de libération du Québec and even some journalists were jailed.

== Economic benefits ==
Some economic literature claims that greater freedom of expression fosters greater economic growth, because the free exchange of ideas stimulates innovation. The opposite (i.e., censorship) hampers academic freedom and research. According to a 2021 econometric analysis commissioned by the think tank the Montreal Economic Institute on the relationship between freedom of expression and economic growth, Canadians would be $2,522 richer every year on average if Canada's public policies encouraged freedom of expression as much as Norway's.

== See also ==
- Censorship in Canada
- Freedom of speech by country
- Freedom of religion in Canada
- History of Canadian newspapers
- Libel trial of Joseph Howe
- Section Two of the Canadian Charter of Rights and Freedoms
