= Rape threat =

Threat of rape or sexual assault

A rape threat is a threat of rape or sexual assault made against another person. Rape threats are often made against prominent celebrities such as high-profile writers, actors, comedians, journalists, businessperson and politicians, and may often be made anonymously or online through the use of social media, especially against influencers. Some rape threats are also tools of coercion used by organized crime to blackmail, extort, intimidate or harass non-compliant subjects into obedience, either directly or implicitly, against the subjects and/or their relatives and close associates.

Measure of the general prevalence of rape threats varies substantially depending on whether studies examine online social media specifically; email, text messaging or other forms of communication; threats made in person; whether rape threats are considered a form of attempted rape; and whether rape threats are considered separately from other threats of unwanted sexual contact. According to one study of college-age women in the United States, as many as 90.5% of rape threats are not reported to police, with the most common reason for failure to report being that it was unclear if the action was a crime or that harm was intended.

Law enforcement and the courts have been criticized by victims and advocates for an inadequate response to rape threat, and existing laws may often not apply to threat issues via social media. At least two cases have reached national supreme courts.

== Definition ==
A rape threat, or the threat of rape was defined by the National College Women Sexual Victimization Study as a "threat of unwanted penetration with force and threat of force", and by the National Violence Against College Women Study as "threatened forced sexual intercourse, including both psychological coercion as well as physical force". Alternatively, the National Crime Victimization Survey included threats of rape as a form of attempted rape.

== Prevalence ==
According to a 2017 report from Amnesty International, 27% of women in the United Kingdom had received "direct or indirect threats of physical or sexual violence" and 47% reported receiving "sexist or misogynistic abuse".

=== Online harassment ===
Rape threats are often made online via social media as a form of online harassment, especially against women. According to English columnist Laurie Penny, "every female writer she knows has received threats of violence and rape." Australian author Emma Jane, described her career writing a weekly column as a "14-year rape-threat-a-palooza". According to Karla Mantilla, editor of the academic journal Feminist Studies, "Rape and death threats are so common that they are almost the rule rather than the exception when women are trolled or harassed online."

According to one study of 134,000 abusive comments on social media, 88% were found to occur on the platform Twitter, another 8% occurred on Facebook, and the remainder on various forums and blogs. (Note: These included all abusive comments, and were not confined to instances of rape threats.) Another review by Demos identified 100,000 uses of the word rape on Twitter between December 2013 and February 2014 and estimated that 12% of them were threatening.

Another examination found that 9% of women in Australia and 9.6% of women in the United Kingdom reported receiving "comments, email or text messages threatening sexual assault". For the UK, this was more common for women age 20 to 24 (%19.6) followed by women age 25 to 29 years of age (%17), while in Australia women age 40 to 44 was the most affected group (%13.5).

=== Against politicians ===
According to a 2016 study of lawmakers from 39 countries by the Inter-Parliamentary Union, 44.4% of elected female representative had been threatened with rape or violence while in office, and 65.5% reported that they had received "humiliating remarks of a sexual or sexist nature" either "several times" or "often". One respondent in particular reported that they had received over 500 online rape threats via the social media platform Twitter over the course of four days.

Threats against politicians have received increasing coverage resulting in a number of high-profile cases. In 2018, the Indian Minister for Home Affairs ordered police in Mumbai to pursue legal action in the case of rape threats made via Twitter against the 10-year-old daughter of politician Priyanka Chaturvedi. Also in 2018, in connection with the Brett Kavanaugh Supreme Court nomination, the offices of a number of US politicians received threats of violence and rape, including that of Dianne Feinstein. In 2014 Indian actor and Member of Parliament Tapas Paul issued a public apology after threatening to "let loose [his] boys" to rape members of the opposing Communist Party of India. A widespread social media campaign was launched in support of Ghanaian Supreme Court Justice Georgina Theodora Wood following public rape threats against her. In the United Kingdom, Member of Parliament Jess Phillips has called for an end to anonymity for Twitter users after receiving over 600 rape threats in a single night.

In 2018, Deserae Morin, a Republican who ran for the Vermont House of Representatives, received a letter that called her a "cunt" and said, "First, we will rape you for days. You will scream and know that agonizing horror."

=== In college ===
In a review of two national studies of college women in the United States, Fisher found that the incidence rate of verbal threats of rape was reported for between 0.01% and 0.48% of respondents. (Note: With an average of 0.31%, and 95% confidence interval of between 0.15% to 0.48% for the National College Women Victimization Study, and an average of 0.07%, with a 95% confidence interval of between 0.01% and 0.014% for the National Violence Against College Women Study.)

In a 2000, the US Department of Justice's published the results of their The Sexual Victimization of College Women, in which they collected data on four types of threats: (Note: Data was based on a national telephone survey of 4,446 women who were attending a 2- or 4-year college or university during fall 1996. The sample was limited to schools with at least 1,000 students and was stratified by the size of the total student enrollment (1,000–2,499; 2,500–4,999; 5,000–19,999; 20,000 or more) and the school's location (urban, suburban, and rural). Schools were randomly chosen using a probability proportional with the size of the total female enrollment.)

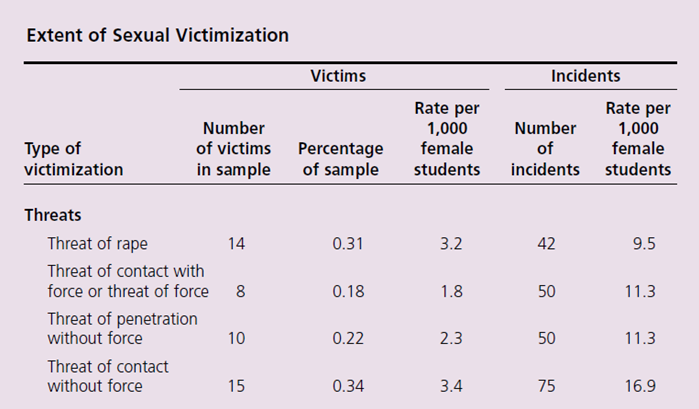
Table showing the reported instances of threatens rape and sexual assault among women attending college in the United States

- Threat of rape - Threat of unwanted penetration with force and threat of force.
- Threat of contact with force or threat of force - Threat of unwanted sexual contact with force and threat of force.
- Threat of penetration without force - Threat of unwanted penetration with the threat of nonphysical punishment, promise of reward, or pestering/verbal pressure.
- Threat of contact without force - Threat of unwanted sexual contact with the threat of nonphysical punishment, promise of reward, or pestering/verbal pressure.

The results indicated that 0.31% had received rape threats, compared with 1.7% who had been the victims of rape. In total, 0.18% had been threatened with contact using force or threat of force, 0.22% had been threatened with penetration without force, and 0.34% had been threatened with contact without force. They found that, of those who had received rape threats, 54.8% occurred off campus, and that 81% of those who received rape threats had taken measures to protect themselves, but that 90.5% of cases were not reported to police. The most common reasons for failure to report threats to police were that:

- The victim did not think the incident was serious enough to report (35.8%)
- It was unclear if the action was a crime or that harm was intended (39.5%)
- Victims did not think police would take the report seriously (34.2%)
- The victim did not want other people to know (34.2%)
- Because of a lack of proof that the incident had occurred (31.6%)
- The victim did not feel that the police would want to be bothered (31.6%) (Note: Respondents were permitted to give more than one response for their rationale for not reporting.)

== Legal history ==
Law enforcement and the court system have received criticism for trivializing the issue of rape threats. In her widely cited 2014 in the Pacific Standard, Amanda Hess recounted police on two separate occasions dismissing her reports in response to receiving rape threats online. (Note: Reprinted verbatim, "Happy to say we live in the same state. Im looking you up, and when I find you, im going to rape you and remove your head.") As the director of the Cyberbullying Research Center told Vice, existing laws often do not cover the use of social media.

When challenged in at least two cases that reached national supreme courts, the Canadian court found in favor of the plaintiff, while that in the United States found in favor of the defendant.

=== R v. McCraw ===
In the case of R v. McCraw, the Supreme Court of Canada considered whether rape threats were considered threats of bodily harm under the nation's Criminal Code. The defendant had anonymously sent typed letters to three women graphically detailing sexual fantasies and promising that "I'm going to fuck you even if I have to rape you". The courts originally ruled that the letters were not culpable threats, because they constituted "adoring fantasies", and because, as they saw it, "rape does not necessarily involve serious bodily harm or even bodily harm." This was overturned by the Supreme Court, citing that "Rape is an act of violence, not just a sexual act. It is a crime that is likely to have serious psychological consequences and may, as well, have serious physical effects."

=== Elonis v. United States ===
In the case of Elonis v. United States the defendant Anthony Elonis had been convicted of four counts related to a series of rape and death threats made on Facebook against his former wife, in addition to threats made to co-workers, a kindergarten class, the local police, and an FBI agent. (Note: These included statements, characterized by Chief Justice John Roberts as "crude, degrading and violent", including passages such as that to his wife stating "If I only knew then what I know now... I would have smothered your ass with a pillow, dumped your body in the backseat, dropped you off in Toad Creek and made it look like a rape and murder," and of an FBI agent who visited his home in response to the threats, "Pull my knife, flick my wrist, and slit her throat") He was fired from his job for the posts, his wife was granted a three-year protective order against him, and he was eventually sentenced to 44 months imprisonment. Elonis asked the court to dismiss the charges, arguing that these were a form of artistic expression and a therapeutic release. His wife testified that she had perceived the posts as threats, stating she "felt extremely afraid for mine and my children's and my family's lives." The Supreme Court of the United States ruled in favor of Elonis, that the government had failed to demonstrate he intended the remarks to be taken as threats.

== See also ==
- Death threat
- Gamergate controversy, an online harassment campaign which targeted women in the video game industry
- Laws regarding rape
